= Salish Sea orcas =

Populations of whales off North America

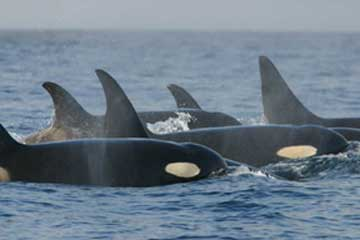
Southern resident orcas.

The waters of the Salish Sea, on the west coast of North America, are home to several ecologically distinct populations of orcas (Orcinus orca). The area supports three major ecotypes of orcas: northern residents, southern residents, and transients. A fourth ecotype, the offshore orcas, occasionally venture into nearshore waters. Little to no interaction occurs between the different ecotypes. Resident and transient orcas have not been observed interbreeding, although occasional brief interactions occur.

Studied since the 1960s, the orcas of the Salish Sea region have become well-known in cetacean research. According to John KB Ford, Graeme B Ellis, and Kenneth C Balcomb, the resident orcas represent "the most intensively studied population of marine mammals in the world." The frequency of sightings of orcas in the Puget Sound region, combined with their prominent place in the ecosystem and their charisma, have made them icons of the region, and their likeness features prominently in Native American culture in the Northwest. Additionally, they are one of the main interests of the many whale watching industries that have sprung up in the region.

== Overview ==
=== Southern resident orcas ===
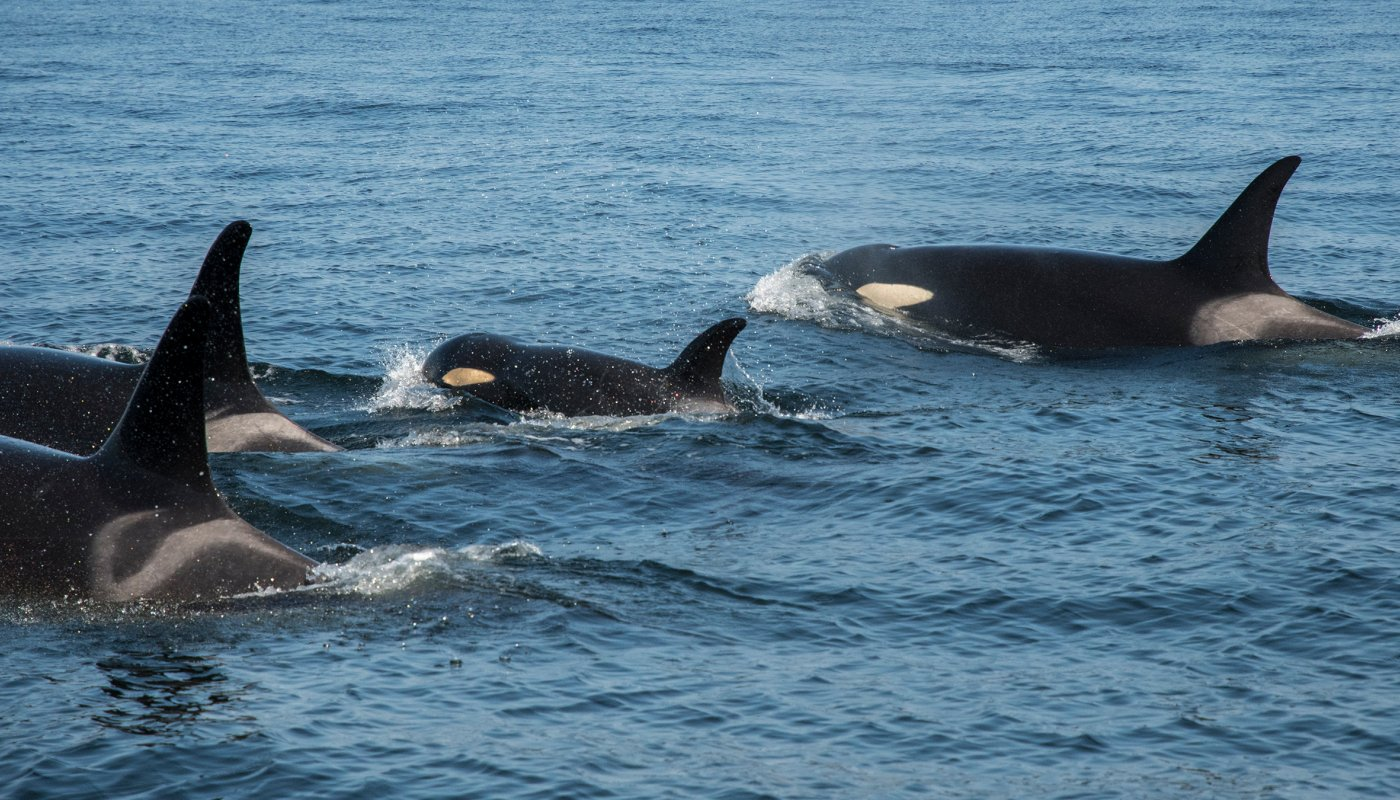
Southern residents from pod J.

The primary range of the Southern resident orcas stretches approximately from the Strait of Juan de Fuca and the south coast of Vancouver Island to the Tacoma Narrows and occasionally Hood Canal, with seasonal ranges encompassing the Pacific coast from British Columbia to Monterey Bay. As of October 2023, the estimated population size is 75 individuals. The population is primarily separated into three pods: J, K, and L. However, all individuals in the Southern resident population are descended from a single bloodline and are considered part of a single clan. The primary distinguishing factor between the Southern and Northern resident orcas is not linked to appearance, but rather matriarchal status, with males descended from living mothers doing more hunting than males without living mothers among southern residents.

In a 1973 study of Northern resident orcas in the Georgia Strait, British-Canadian scientist Michael Bigg found that minor injuries, such as dents in the dorsal fins, did not fully heal over time and remained prominent on the individual for the rest of their lives. This led to the use of these marks as the primary method for individual identification in the wild. In addition to individual markings, distribution during the summer breeding season can be used to distinguish the northern or southern resident groups. This, along with charting the distribution of each group during summer and winter, is the most prominent way of recognizing both individual orcas and the group to which they belong. Both residents and transients are catalogued in this way, and both the Canadian Department of Fisheries and the Center for Whale Research use these methods to track all individual orcas within the Salish Sea. As of 2023, all 73 known southern residents, 310 northern residents, and 349 Bigg's orcas in British Columbia and Washington have been catalogued. In BC, cataloging orcas is primarily done by the provincial government, while in Washington, it is primarily done by the NGO nonprofit Center for Whale Research.

Both resident groups of orcas are known for having a more rounded and straight, somewhat slanted towards the back, upward-facing dorsal fin compared to transients, which have a more pointed, shark-like fin going straight up, and a more prominent, grayish "cape" on their backs. The eyespot of residents is usually smaller than transients, and is more in line with the body, having an upward slant near its rear edge. Differences in body size cannot be determined visually; however, residents overall are smaller than transients, with southern residents being the smallest of the three ecotypes.

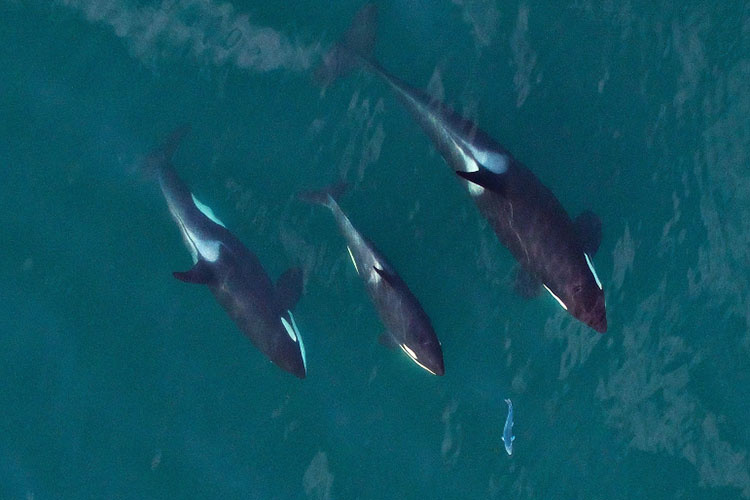
Southern resident orcas chasing chinook salmon (bottom center.

Southern resident orcas feed exclusively on fish, with salmon being their preferred prey; it is estimated that up to 80% of the diet of southern residents consists of chinook salmon, mostly coming from the Fraser River. Other types of salmon, herring, halibut, and lingcod are also consumed. While there is no record of southern resident orcas eating harbor porpoises, at least 78 incidents have been recorded since 1962 involving orcas harassing harbor porpoises, of which 28 resulted in the porpoise's death; it has never been confirmed whether this is the result of competition for food, rough play, or true aggression.

Low reproductive rates hinder population growth among orcas. Females do not mature until they are 10 to 13 years old, and gestation is approximately 15 months. With the female maintaining care for her calf until it is two years old, orcas are only able to produce a calf once every 39 months, and thus cannot recover quickly from population decline. Inbreeding also has a negative effect on the population. The total mortality level in young of the year orcas can be as high as 43%.

=== Northern resident orcas ===
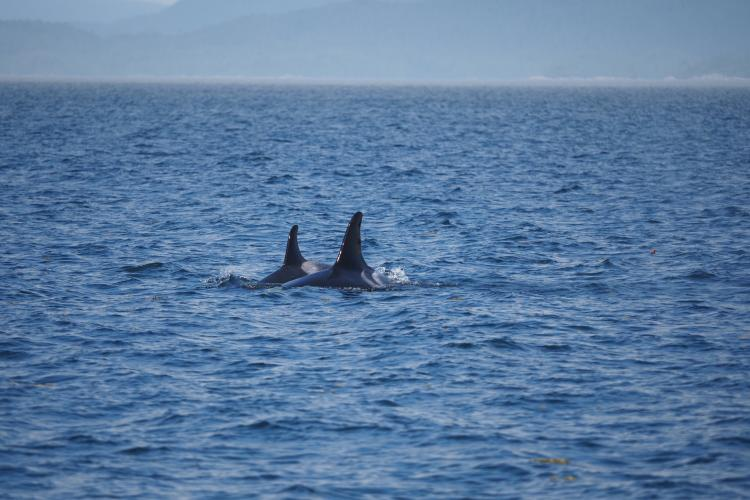
Northern resident A73 "Springer" and second calf "Storm".

The larger population of northern residents primarily ranges from the mid-coast of Alaska south into British Columbia through the Strait of Georgia and both sides of Vancouver Island south to Gray's Harbor, with the bulk of their range encompassing the Strait of Georgia and most of Vancouver Island, and north to Haida Gwaii. The northern residents number over 300 whales. They demonstrate seasonal shifts, generally inhabiting Chatham Sound in summer, Johnstone Strait in fall, and the San Juan Islands in winter. Northern resident orcas are divided into three clans totaling 16 pods, showing higher genetic diversity compared with southern residents. As with southern residents, northern residents subsist mostly on salmon, with chinook constituting the bulk of their diet. However, the unique hunting techniques of northern residents may have assisted in their recovery compared to southern residents. In northern residents, females do most of the herding and hunting of salmon, whereas in southern residents, males do most of the hunting. It has been found that female southern residents do not actively forage when nursing calves, so males must hunt in their place; in northern residents, females continue to hunt even when nursing calves. Lack of foraging by female southern residents during calving season may reduce the ability of the group to hunt cooperatively and deprive it of valuable foraging experience.

Northern residents do not differ morphologically from southern residents aside from individual markings. Their calls closely resemble one another, as do overall body shapes, and life history is assumed to be similar for both types. Differentiation between groups focuses primarily on their distribution; only southern residents are known to enter Puget Sound and the Whidbey Island area, and are the primary species found within the San Juan Islands and the southern part of Vancouver Island; whereas northern residents do not usually leave the Strait of Georgia or Johnstone Strait. However, given that both types can inhabit the San Juan Islands and southern residents occasionally enter BC waters, individual and pod identification are the only clear means of differentiating the northern and southern residents pods. No known direct interactions between northern and southern resident pods have been documented.

=== Transient orcas ===
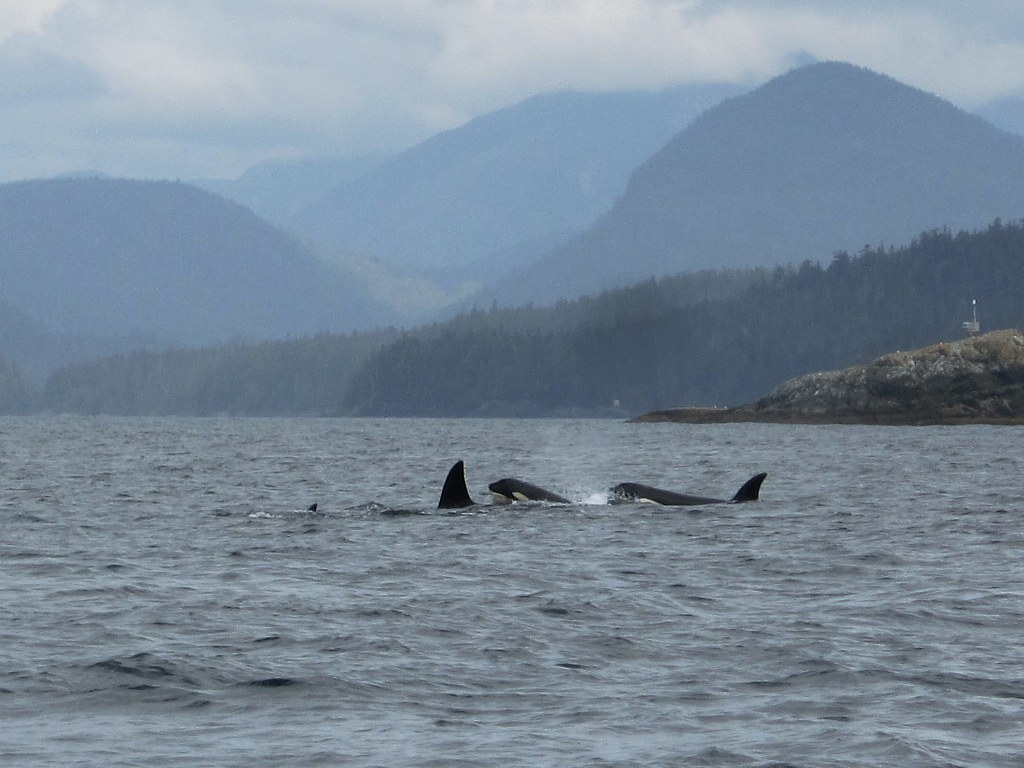
Transient orcas off the coast of Tofino, British Columbia.

Little is known about the genetics and life history of transient orcas, also known as Bigg's orcas. Unlike residents, much less individual identification via photo-ID has been conducted, largely due to increased spatial movement and less knowledge of overall pod structure compared to residents. Nevertheless, transients have been identified in increasing numbers over the years, and like residents, can be identified individually by marks and scars on their bodies. Known for their more shark-like fins, large size, solid gray patches, and larger eyespots, transient orcas are found throughout the Salish Sea region, which appears to be their main area of occurrence. Their primary calls, which differ from residents, are composed of a series of click-like vocalizations and harsh, screaming sounds primarily used to frighten and trap prey when hunting. The primary diet of transient orcas includes harbor seals, Steller sea lions, harbor porpoises, Dall's porpoises, Pacific white-sided dolphins, and Minke whales. Among these, the harbor seal is the most common prey; one survey estimated that more than half of the diet of transients in the Salish Sea region consists of harbor seals. Attacks on large whales in the region are relatively rare and no incidents of successful predation have occurred, although isolated incidents of transients harassing gray whales and humpback whales, including predation, have been observed outside the Salish Sea. However, interactions do sometimes become spectacular; in October 2022, a rare battle near Vancouver was observed between a pod of transients and humpbacks that ended with the group disappearing into the fog, with the ultimate outcome unknown.

Having split from other orcas 750,000 years ago, no interbreeding occurs between transient and resident orcas. Interactions between transients and residents are very rare; they actively avoid one another and are never known to socialize. Nevertheless, when interactions do occur, it seems the residents, despite being smaller and less carnivorous, dominate the transients. In 2021, southern residents K16 and L72 surfaced in the midst of a pod of transient pod's hunt of an unknown prey species. After a short scuffle, the transients quickly departed the area, leaving the area to the residents. A similar but more brutal encounter was recorded in 1993, when transients were attacked by members of the J-pod and almost forced onto the rocks at Nanaimo. After a battle that lasted for at least several minutes, the transients fled the area with scars, leaving the victorious residents to regroup.

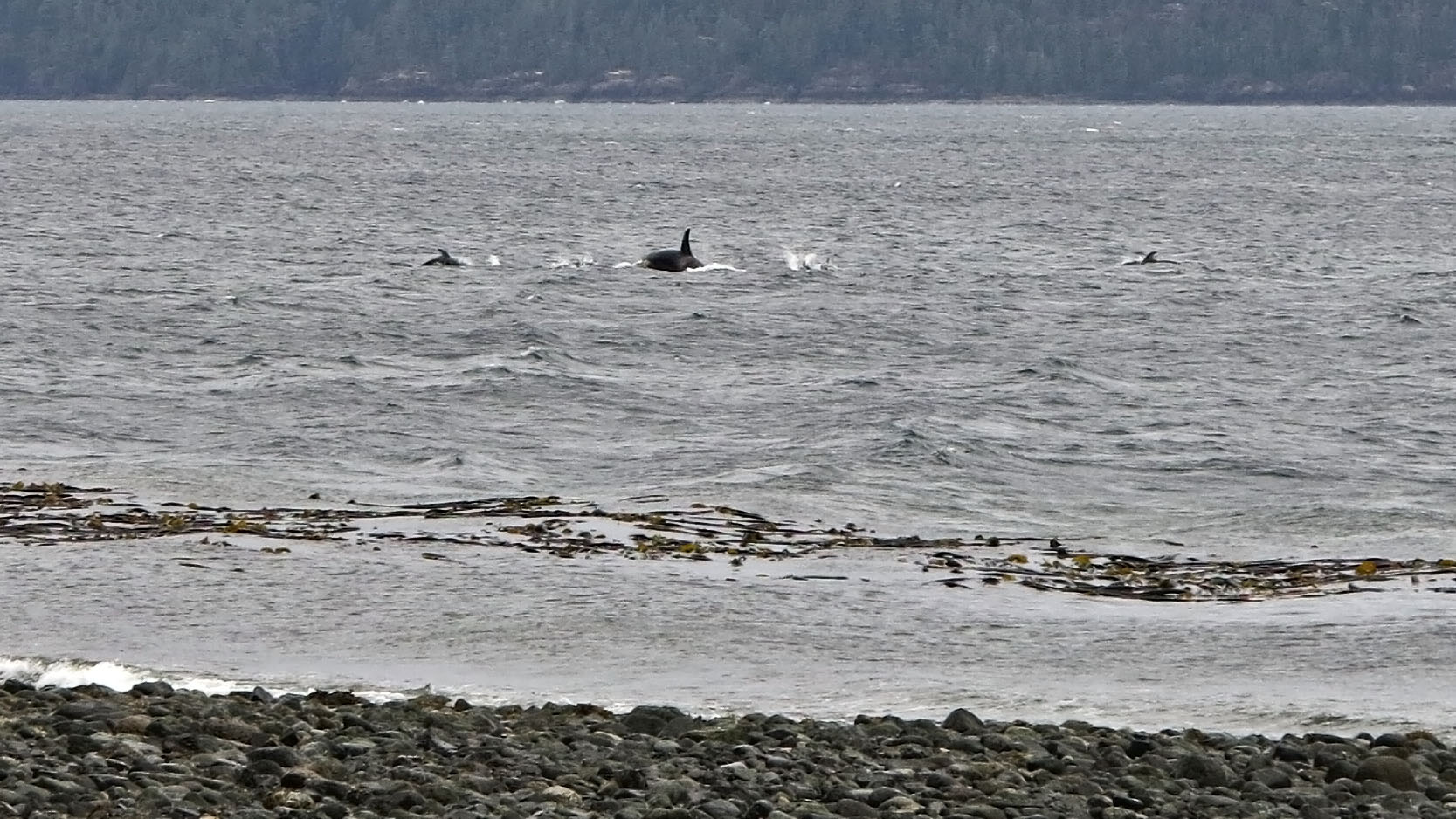
Transient orca harassed by dolphins, Johnstone Strait.

=== Offshore orcas ===
Offshore orcas, first described in 1979, are primarily found more than 10 miles (16 km) from shore. Just over 280 offshore orcas are known from the Eastern North Pacific, primarily occurring off the coast of British Columbia. Although forays into the Salish Sea are rare, the area immediately offshore, including the Barkley submarine canyon, is home to large numbers. In contrast to transient and resident orcas, the teeth of offshore orcas are usually quite worn-down and often blunt, potentially shortening their lives; this has been confirmed to be linked to their primary diet - sharks - and the tough skin they possess. The sharks most commonly taken are mako, thresher, sevengill, and on rare occasions, great white sharks. The first recorded incidence of orca predation on great white sharks, in 1997, may have involved an offshore whale.

== Human history ==
The earliest recorded post-colonization interactions between Salish Sea orcas and humans occurred in the early 1960s, when fishermen in Seymour Narrows, near Campbell River, BC, began to complain of orcas taking salmon from nets and interfering with fishing operations. At the time, orcas were not only viewed as costly competition with fishermen for salmon, but as dangerous and threatening to humans as well, and were viewed negatively across the region. In response to these complaints, a machine gun was installed at Seymour Narrows with the intent of killing any orca that passed by. Although the gun was removed after a few months without ever being fired, its installation reflected a persistent degree of negativity surrounding orcas in the region. Despite their reputation as man-eaters, fascination with orcas led to many wanting to see these largely unknown creatures close-up, alive or dead, in order to better understand them. In 1964, Vancouver Aquarium curator Murray Newman requested an orca be harpooned in order to serve as a reference for a life-sized sculpture that would greet museum visitors. A team led by Sam Burich and Ronald Sparrow was sent out to capture an orca. On July 16, 1964, a pod was sighted and one of the whales was harpooned, but did not die. Not wishing to seem inhumane, Newman instructed the team not to kill the whale, but instead tow it to a netted-off area at Burrard Dry Dock near the Vancouver Aquarium. While the initial motive in keeping the whale was to provide a template for the sculpture and present scientists with a unique opportunity to study a little-known creature, the aquarium soon became overwhelmed with visitors eager to see an orca for the first time. Within weeks, the whale had become a national interest, and was given the name Moby Doll. By now, the whale was marketed as a public attraction and began to spark interest in other aquariums for catching orcas. Moby Doll ultimately did not live long after capture, and died October 9, 1964 from an illness caused by the low water salinity at Burrard Dry Dock and complications from his harpoon wounds.

Undeterred by the short life of Moby Doll, others soon set out to capture orcas from the Puget Sound region. The first, and most famous, was accidental. In June 1965, a large bull orca became trapped in a salmon net near Namu, British Columbia, and was sold to animal collector Ted Griffin for $8000. Naming the whale Namu, after its place of capture, Griffin placed the individual in the care of the Seattle Marine Aquarium, which he owned at the time. For over a year Namu entertained millions, even starring in a film named after him. This publicity set off a string of orca captures, with dozens of aquariums attempting to replicate the success of Namu. It was during this time that a female orca named Shamu was captured from Puget Sound. She was intended as a potential mate for Namu, but the two did not get along and Shamu was sent to SeaWorld San Diego in late 1965, beginning a tradition of keeping orcas at SeaWorld that continues to this day. Namu died in July 1966; it was initially believed that he had drowned after trying to escape his pen, but a subsequent autopsy revealed that he died of a bacterial infection caused by sewage runoff into Elliott Bay.

Following this, orca captures became widespread worldwide; an estimated 263 orcas were captured in the Salish Sea region alone between 1962 and 1977. Of these, 50 were taken to oceanariums, 12 died during capture, and 201 were released. The impact of this take on local populations was significant given that 47 of the 62 captured or killed orcas were southern residents, corresponding to more than half of the southern resident population. Many believe the failure of the southern residents to increase over the past few decades has been linked to the loss of genetic diversity resulting from the 1960s captures. The fact that all three pods (J, K, L) interbreed and interact regularly creates additional genetic challenges for the survivors, and no pod maintains its historical diversity. In 1970, the notorious Penn Cove capture resulted in the deaths of five calves and the capture of seven more, including the female Lolita (Tokitae) who died in 2023 after 53 years in captivity. The brutality of the event led to institution of a permit system by the state of Washington in 1971 in order to control the herding of orcas. This was soon superseded by the federal Marine Mammal Protection Act of 1972, which forbade the killing or harassment of any marine mammal and brought the capture of orcas to an end.

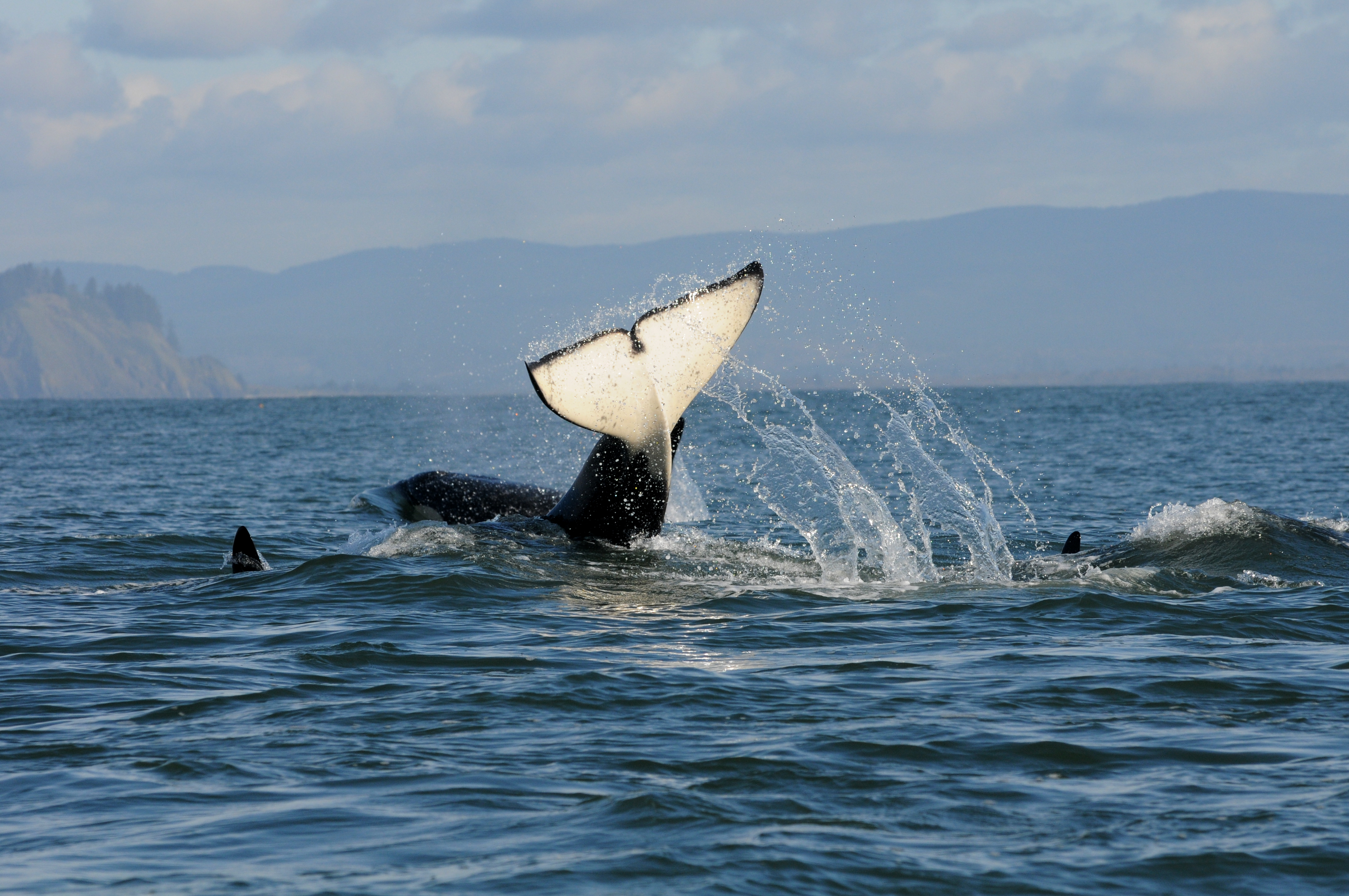
Southern residents, Olympic Coast National Marine Sanctuary.

However, an economic hardship exemption clause remained that allowed SeaWorld to continue orca capture operations. Until 1976 in Washington and 1977 in BC, SeaWorld carried out small-scale captures of whales in Salish Sea waters. These came to an end when a particularly cruel attempt at capture was observed by Ralph Monroe, an aid to Governor Dan Evans, who stopped the capture upon seeing the orcas in distress. After further investigation, Monroe phoned Governor Evans, who filed a federal restraining order against SeaWorld, forbidding them from taking any additional whales. After a legal battle, all orca captures in Washington came to an end. While orca captures in BC came to an end a year later in 1977, captures in other areas such as Iceland continued well into the 1980s.

Orca behavior and social life in the Salish Sea came to the public eye in the early 1970s with the works of Mike Bigg. In addition to identifying individual whales via their scars and body patterns, Bigg was able to successfully differentiate them by their habits and individual associations. Bigg was the first to identify transient orcas as significantly different in eating habits, behavior, and distribution from resident orcas; hence they bear his name. His recommendation in the late 1970s that orcas be placed on the endangered list in Canada fueled interest in protecting the animals throughout the region. The first sanctuary specifically designed to protect cetaceans was established in 1982 in Robson Bight, part of Johnstone Strait, was dedicated in honor of Bigg. Prior to his death in 1990, Bigg had lobbied for the inclusion of orcas on the Canadian threatened list, and while he never lived to see them listed, four of the five known populations in Canada, including the northern residents, were listed as "At Risk" in 2001. In 2008, Johnstone Strait and southeastern Queen Charlotte Strait were designated as critical habitat for northern resident orcas. Likewise, NOAA designated all of Puget Sound and the Juan de Fuca Strait as southern resident orca critical habitat in 2006, and updated it in 2021 to include all coastal waters of the Northwest from Cape Flattery to Monterey Bay.

Ongoing threats to orcas include ship traffic, pollution, dams, and arguably most important, conflict with humans for food. Since the 1980s, salmon populations in Puget Sound have declined by 60%, and hatcheries have made only marginal success in helping them recover. The primary food source of southern residents is Fraser River salmon, which provide over 70% of all salmon in the system. While Fraser River salmon as a whole are not currently endangered, chinook - which provide more than three-quarters of the diet of southern residents - have declined by more than half in the last decades, largely due to hatchery mismanagement, mishandled recovery plans, and an industry-based approach to solving environmental problems. The Skagit, Snohomish, and Puyallup chinook runs are also gravely depleted, and as of the last major 5-year salmon recovery plan (2016), all chinook salmon populations in the Puget Sound drainage system are listed as below recovery escape levels (i.e., the level at which the population can be considered on the road to recovery). The Fraser salmon fare little better; 14 of 16 stocks of chinook that spawn in the Fraser are listed as threatened or endangered by Canada's Species at Risk Act. Only two potential populations of chinook with a distribution including Puget Sound are at a viable size.

Since the 1980s, Salish Sea orcas have become icons of the wild nature of the region, an emblem of the charismatic megafauna of Puget Sound, and a reminder that the region's nature is precious and worth saving. In the forty years since the Johnstone Strait was first declared protected in 1982, almost the entire Johnstone Strait-Georgia Strait region, as well as Puget Sound and most of the strait of Juan de Fuca, has been declared critical orca habitat. While symbolically a major victory, human impacts on the whales have continued, as the designation has no legal basis to regulate human activity in the whales' range. Equally concerning is the list of toxic chemicals the orcas have accumulated in their bloodstream over years of living in industrially-polluted waters. Most notorious of these are PCBs, which may be responsible for deformities resulting in miscarriages and stillbirths, exemplified by Tahlequah's calf in 2018. Additionally, it has recently been revealed that southern residents contain large amounts of 4NP, a toxic chemical used in pulp and paper production, that when ingested, remain in the whales' systems for life, and can even pass from mothers to calves during gestation.

In 2008, the first recovery plan for southern resident orcas was released by NOAA, consisting of an overview of the life history of the population as well as their prospects for recovery. The main factors identified as inhibiting recovery were sonar activities caused by naval exercises, collisions with ships transiting through orca habitat, growth and developmental problems caused by chemical ingestion, and most importantly, loss of salmon caused by stream degradation. The updated recovery plan in 2016-2020 identified the primary threats to orca populations as 1) negative interactions with vessels, and 2) depletion of salmon food sources. The need for protection of orca health, habitat, and conservation through outreach were emphasized. While this plan has the potential to make a positive impact, no significant progress has been made on restoring the salmon runs of Puget Sound or the Fraser River as of 2024. Speed limits and shipping lanes to ensure boating and shipping traffic does not collide with orcas are still lacking. While the southern resident population, currently at 74 individuals, appears to have stabilized with the birth of a new calf and the death of male K34 in 2023, little progress on recovery can be expected until the NOAA recovery plan is fully implemented, including restoration of salmon runs.

== Individual whales ==
=== Luna ===
Luna, identified as L98, was a male orca from the southern resident L pod. Known for his inquisitive and friendly nature, he took up residence in Nootka Sound, on the west coast of Vancouver Island. In 2001, he was separated from his pod (a year in which five pod members died) and lived on his own in the Sound for almost five years. His increasing friendliness to humans and desire to interact with boats caused concern. An attempt by the Canadian DFO to return him to his pod was dropped after opposition from locals. In March 2006, after getting too close to a tugboat whose crew he knew and frequently interacted with, he was sucked into the propeller vortex and killed.

=== Springer ===
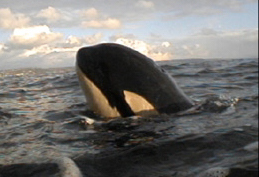
Springer in 2002, as a calf.

Springer, identified at A73, is a female northern resident from the A pod found as a calf in Seattle's Elliott Bay in January 2002. It is considered highly unusual for northern resident orcas to enter Puget Sound, primarily the domain of the southern residents. After the calf remained in the area for several months, displaying highly uncharacteristic behaviors including rubbing against boats and following any traffic that entered her area, along with declining physical health, the decision was made to transport her to a sea pen, where she was raised for a month. Originally, her captivity was intended to last 1–2 years, as it was believed she would have to be brought up to BC to reunite with her pod. However, her family was detected in Johnstone Strait in July. Given that she appeared to be in good health, she was taken to Campbell River and released into her pod, which welcomed her. She has since given birth to two healthy calves.

=== Lolita (Tokitae) ===
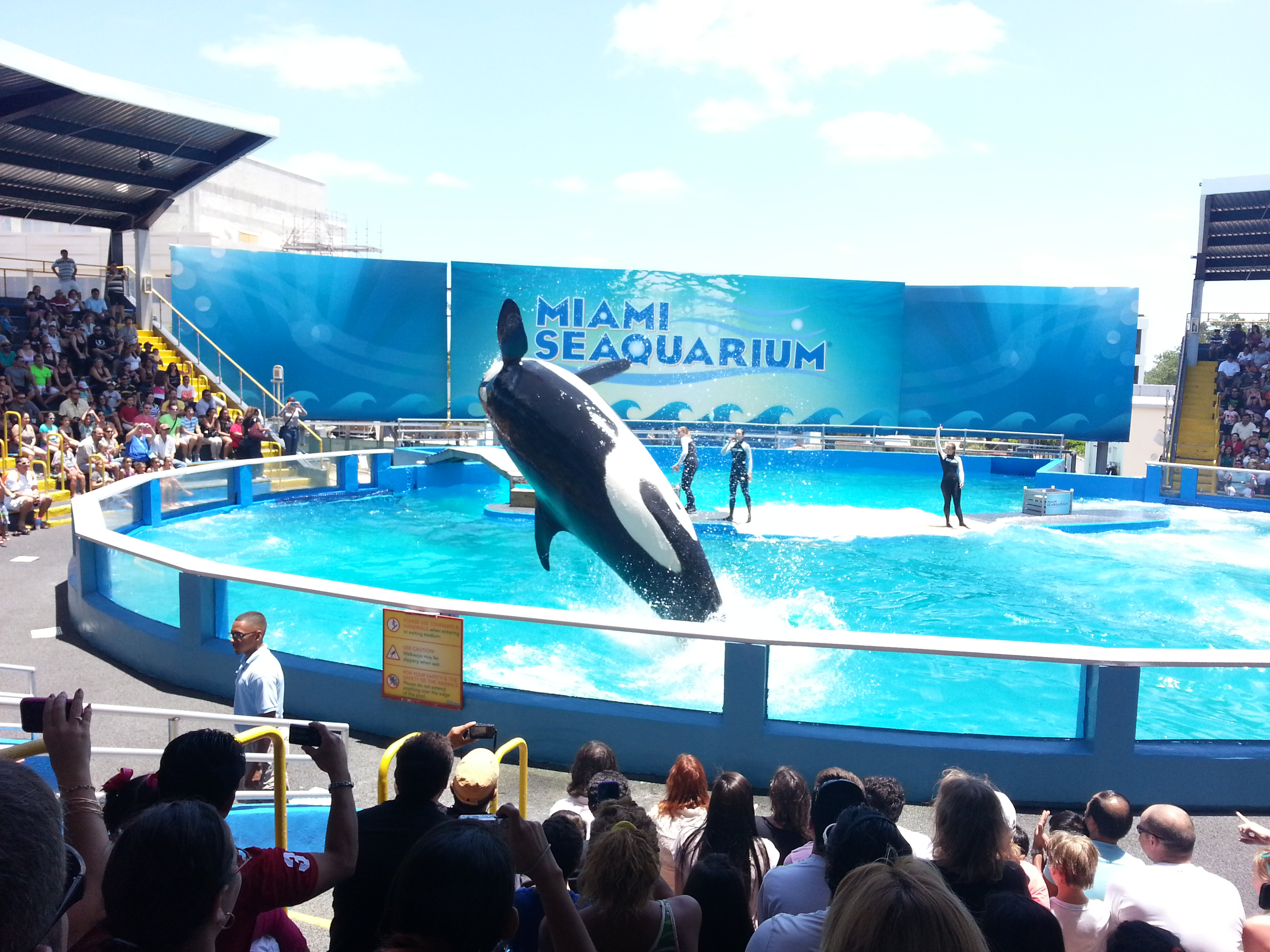
Lolita performing at Miami Seaquarium.

Lolita was a southern resident of the L pod, captured in Penn Cove in 1970, who spent the majority of her life at Miami Seaquarium in Florida. At the time of her death in 2023, she was the last remaining captive orca from the 1960s-1970s Washington captures, prior to the implementation of the Marine Mammal Protection Act. After five decades of captivity, she was succumbing to skin lesions, with a chronic lung infection continuing to weaken her body. Since the death of Hugo, a male orca captured with her in 1980, Lolita had been the only orca at Miami Seaquarium. She shared her tank with common dolphins, pilot whales, and Pacific white-sided dolphins throughout her time at Seaquarium. The refusal to release Lolita, as well as her overall living standards before her death, have become a symbol for the movement opposing orca captivity for reasons other than medical need.

=== Granny ===
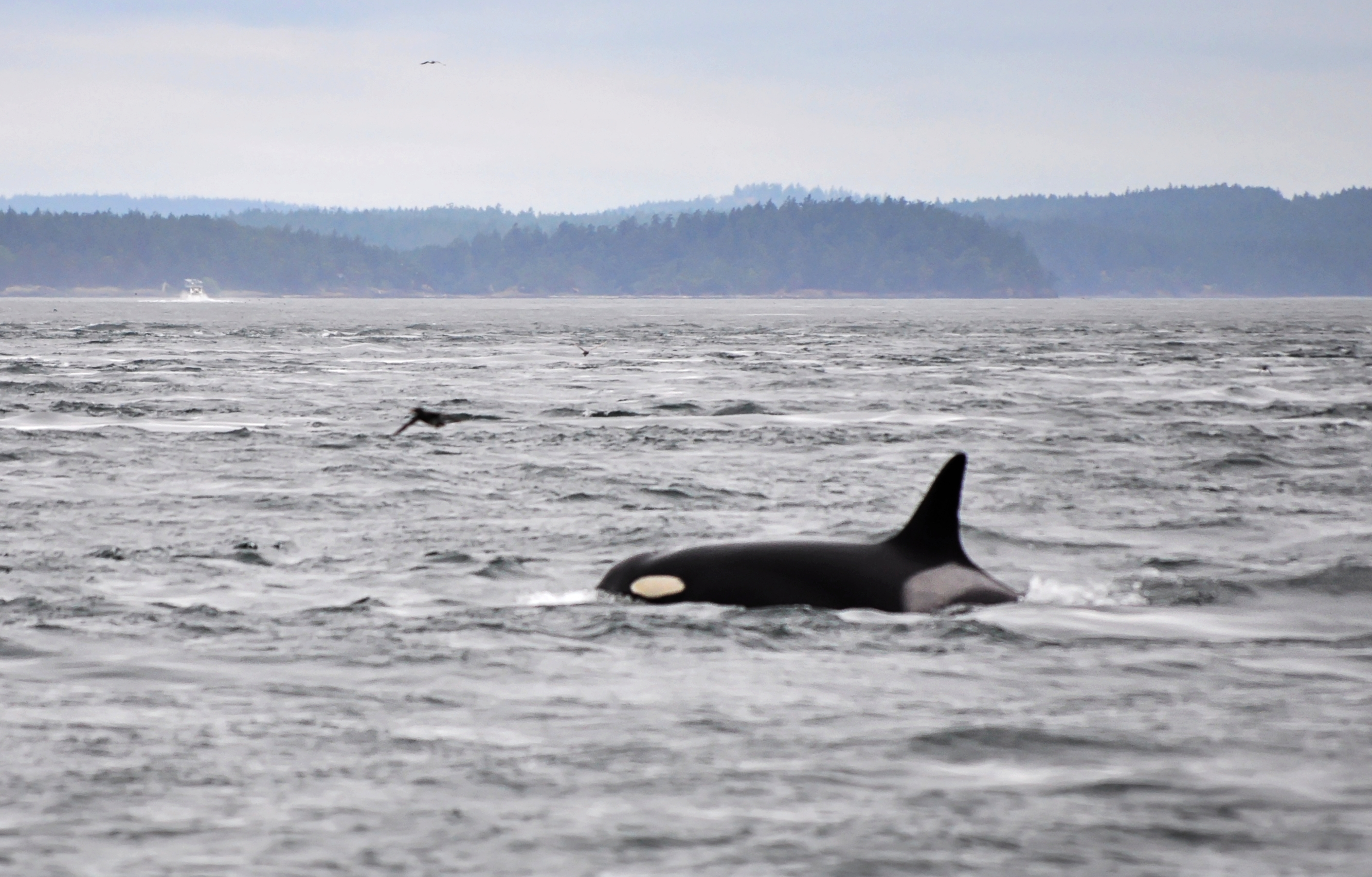
Granny in 2011.

Granny (southern resident J2) was the oldest fully authenticated wild orca on record, at least 65 years old at the time of her presumed death in October 2016. Her exact age will never be known; she was first sighted in 1967, during an orca capture, and was considered too old for capture due to her age (estimated at more than 40, due to her being judged to be post-reproductive). A later sighting of her in 1971 seemed to confirm that she had borne calves, with the male accompanying her (J1 Ruffles) appearing to be her son, although this was later deemed to be false. Her age was initially estimated at 105 at the time of her death, thought to have been born in 1911. However, with the revelation that J1 was not her calf, and a biopsy sample taken in 2016 just before her death, her actual age was estimated at 65–80 years old.

== In popular culture ==
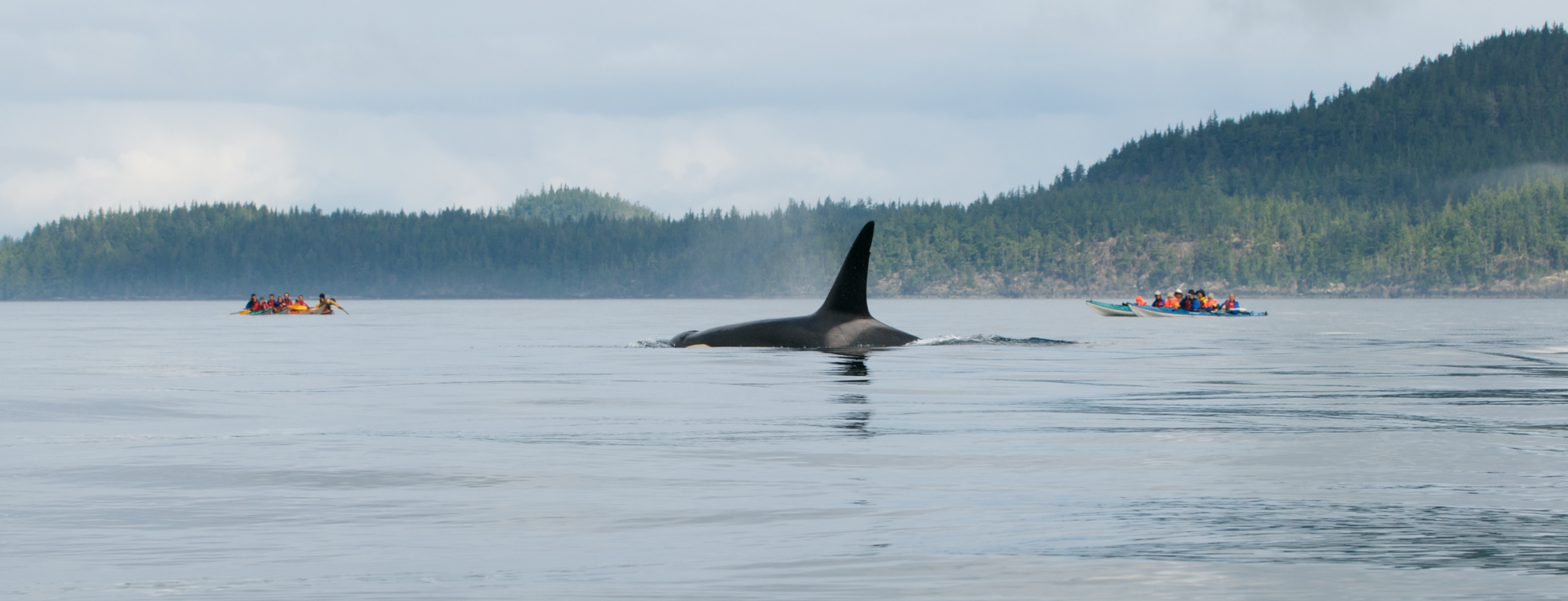
Boaters watching northern resident orca in Johnstone Strait.

The plight of the orcas has attracted attention throughout the Pacific Northwest and the United states since the 1980s. The Salish Sea orcas have become an iconic natural treasure of the region and a symbol of the area's ecological productivity. Many whale watching organizations throughout the region target the orcas, including resident and transient groups, and often work with nonprofit organizations like the Center for Whale Research and The Whale Museum to promote orca conservation. Native American tribes and First Nations throughout the area hold the whales in high regard. The Lummi Nation in particular has been outspoken about its relationship with the animals. Within the tribe, orcas are regarded as relatives, with some considering them the reincarnated spirits of chiefs. In particular, they were instrumental in the ultimately unsuccessful attempt to return Lolita from Miami Seaquarium back to Puget Sound. The Tulalip tribe of Everett also hold orcas in high regard, often displaying them on totem poles and artwork designs. An orca is the official mascot of the Tulalip Casino and Resort.

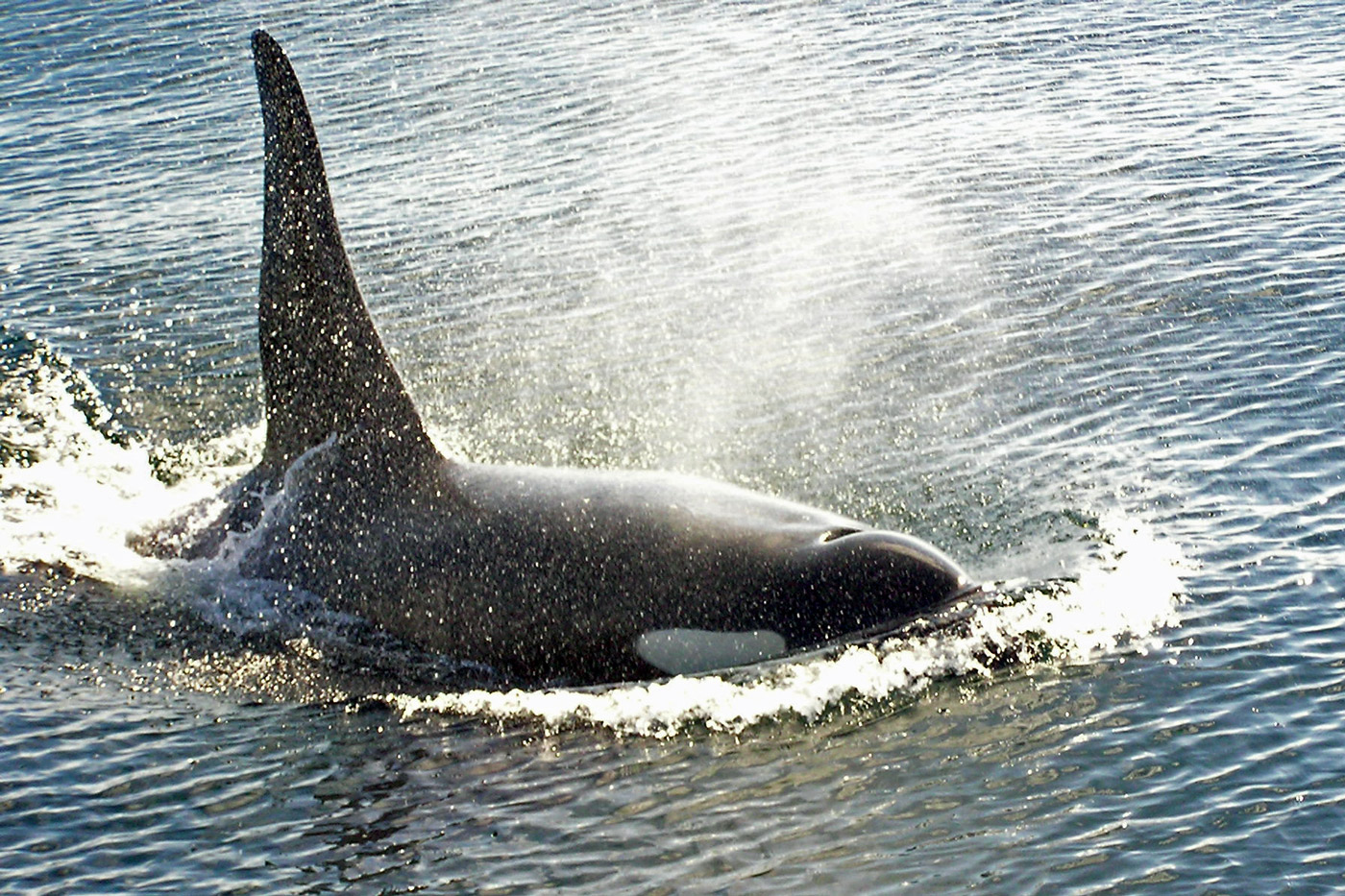
Bull orca approaching boat, Victoria, BC, Canada.

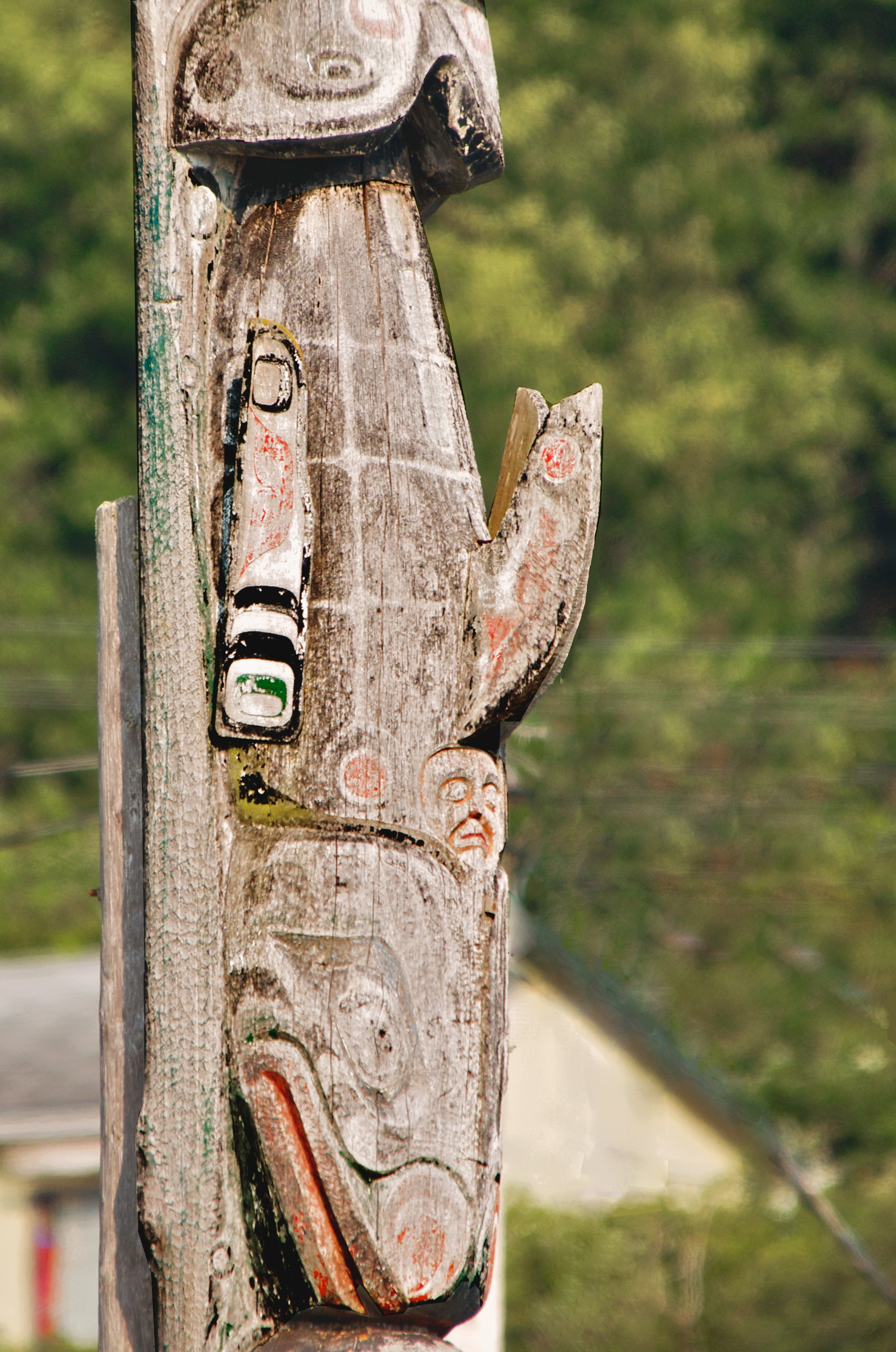
Orca totem pole, Alert Bay, BC.

== See also ==
- Orca types and populations
- List of cetaceans
