= Tahlequah (orca) =

Orca whale

J35 Tahlequah
- Species: Orca (Orcinus orca)
- Breed: Southern Resident
- Sex: Female
- Born: c. 1998 (age 27–28)
- Offspring: 2 living, 2 dead
- Named after: Tahlequah, Washington

Tahlequah (born c. 1998), also known as J35, is an orca of the southern resident community in the northeastern Pacific Ocean. She has given birth to five known offspring, a male (J47, Notch) in 2010, a female (Tali) in 2018, a male (J57, Phoenix) in 2020, a female (J61) in 2024 and another male in 2026 (J65). Her second calf, Tali, died shortly after birth, and J35 carried her body for 17 days in an apparent show of grief that attracted international attention. Her fourth calf died within days of her birth and was also carried by Tahlequah.

== Name ==
J35 was given the name Tahlequah by The Whale Museum in Friday Harbor, Washington, as part of their Adopt-a-Whale outreach program. One of her adopters was Malia Obama, daughter of former United States President Barack Obama.

== Life ==
J35 was born in 1998 to J17 (Princess Angeline), a member of the J pod of the Southern Resident community, and has two living siblings. J35's first calf, a male named J47 (Notch), was born in 2010, and researchers speculated that she miscarried another calf in the mid-2010s. After the death of her sister J28 (Polaris) in 2016, J35 cared for her two offspring, until one, that was still milk-dependent, starved to death.

Her second calf (Tali), a female, was born on July 24, 2018, off Victoria, British Columbia; she was alive, but she died within a half-hour of her birth. The infant population and health of the Southern Residents community had declined in the early 21st century, due in part to a smaller supply of Chinook salmon and the presence of polluting substances in the Salish Sea.

J35 carried the calf's body on her rostrum while following the pod around the San Juan Islands and interior waters of British Columbia over the following two weeks. Whale researchers noted that J35 looked emaciated, and other pod members were showing concern for her health. After the seventh day, other members began taking turns floating the calf while allowing J35 to rest. By the ninth day, the calf had shown signs of decomposition and was becoming harder to carry. The pod disappeared for several days in early August but were spotted on August 8, with J35 still carrying her calf, Tali, after 16 days. By the next day, after 1,000 miles (1,600 km) of swimming, J35 released the calf and rejoined the J pod with no apparent signs of malnutrition or ill health.

Her unusually long period of grieving attracted international attention and an outpouring of sympathy, comparing her actions to that of a human mother. Whether her actions amounted to performing funeral rites is debated. The ongoing crisis within the Southern Residents community prompted calls for intervention, including dam removals and the increased killing of sea lions who interfere with salmon growth in the Columbia River. Washington Governor Jay Inslee stated that he supported new measures to address orca-related issues and would work with state and federal officials to find short-term solutions.

In July 2020, a drone survey of the J, K, and L pods revealed that J35 showed signs of an active pregnancy. She gave birth to a male calf on September 5 near the San Juan Islands. The calf was named J57 by the Center for Whale Research and nicknamed Phoenix by the museum.

J35 gave birth to another calf in December 2024. The calf was first reported by observers on December 20. Whale researchers identified the new calf as female and named her J61 on December 23 but expressed concern about her condition. On December 31, J61 was declared dead after a health study of the Southern Residents; she had been pushed along by her mother and "looked lethargic" on the December 23 and December 24 viewings. On January 1, 2025, J35 was observed near Vashon Island in Puget Sound carrying J61's body. Her mourning period continued for over 11 days; a sighting on February 8 confirmed that she was no longer carrying J61's body.

On October 19, 2026, she was spotted with a new male calf believed to be under a week old.

== See also ==
- List of individual cetaceans
