= J16 =

J16 may refer to:

== Roads ==
- County Route J16 (California)
- Malaysia Federal Route J16

== Vehicles ==
- GSR Class J16, an Irish steam locomotive
- INS Jamuna (J16), a Sandhayak-class survey ship of the Indian Navy
- LNER Class J16, a British steam locomotive class
- Shenyang J-16, a Chinese strike fighter aircraft

== Other uses ==
- Elongated pentagonal bipyramid, a Johnson solid (J_{16})
- Pneumonia
- J16, an orca, mother of Scarlet
