= Shylock (play) =

Play by Mark Leiren-Young

Shylock is a monologue in one 80-minute act written by Canadian playwright Mark Leiren-Young. It premiered at Bard on the Beach on August 5, 1996, where it was directed by John Juliani and starred popular Canadian radio host, David Berner. Its American debut was in 1998 at Philadelphia's Walnut Street Theatre where it was directed by Deborah Block, starred William Leach and was “Barrymore Recommended.” It has since been produced at theatres, Shakespeare Festivals and Fringes throughout Canada and the US (including the San Diego Repertory Theatre where it was staged opposite a controversial production of The Merchant of Venice), was translated for a production in Denmark and has been staged twice by the original actor, Berner, in Venice. A Czech translation by Jitka Sloupova ran in Prague from 2016 to 2019 at Divadlo Na Jezerce and starred Milan Kňažko.

The play focuses on a Jewish actor named Jon Davies, who is featured as Shylock in a production of Shakespeare’s The Merchant of Venice. Jon addresses his audience at a “talk back” session, after the play is closed abruptly due to controversy over the play's alleged antisemitism. Davies is portrayed both in and out of character, presenting and stripping down the layers between character and actor.

In 2024 and 2025, a new version of the play was staged in Toronto under the title Playing Shylock with Saul Rubinek performing as a fictional version of himself. From October 22 to December 7, 2025, Rubinek performs Playing Shylock in its US premiere, off Broadway at the Polonsky Shakespeare Center in Brooklyn.

== Background ==
In the comedy The Merchant of Venice, the character of Shylock lends a fellow merchant money. The merchant's ships sink, yet despite this loss, Shylock demands his money back. His defiant nature supposedly stems from a desire to avenge the unfair treatment of his Jewish people by Christians. Shylock is ultimately humiliated by the Christian court, his daughter disobeys him and marries out of race, and he is swindled out of his bond and forced to convert. At the time it was written, in 16th-century Venice, Jewish citizens were locked in the ghetto at nighttime and were forced to wear identifying hats during the day.

=== Plot ===
The main character, Jewish actor Jon Davies, asserts that Shakespeare intended the character of Shylock to be played as a villain in The Merchant of Venice based on the attitudes towards Jews during the era he was writing; thus, past productions either presented Shylock as a clown or tragic victim while maintaining the hostile attitude towards Jews in classical Venice. The narrative focuses on the opening night of the play, where Davies' interpretation of his character causes drastic upset amongst audience members. One of them, a local professor of Jewish descent, spits at Davies, calls him a “traitor to his race”, publishes a harsh review, and organizes a community boycott.

The producers inform Davies that they will have to close early because of the bad publicity. At the final performance, Davies emerges after the final act in full costume and make-up, stripping off the character layer by layer as he speaks, until he stands before the audience to be judged as himself. Davies, a well-educated thespian, clarifies that Shylock was met with antagonism not because of outrage at his portrayal, but because of his recognized status as villain of the play. He closes the narrative by arguing that art and theatre should be provocative and challenging, regardless of potentially offensive or uncomfortable subjects.

== Themes ==
The play addresses questions surrounding the diverse nature of art, the role and duties of the artist and the theatre in regards to audience reaction and critical response. Jon decides to play Shylock not as a victim, but as a villain, causing conflict due to his own Jewish heritage and his layered portrayal of Shylock’s character. Questions of historical revisionism, cultural manipulation, and political correctness lead to accusations of racism and of Jon as a “self-hating Jew”, forcing him to reassess his interpretation of the character as an actor, as well as his own persona. Shylock also examines the integrity of theatre at present through the lens of oversimplified Shakespearean translations, questioning the future of stage productions under the weight of censorship.

== Responses ==
Shylock has received overwhelmingly positive critical and popular response, the script having been staged across Canada and the United States. The play has been continually praised by reviewers for directly confronting the controversy surrounding Antisemitism in The Merchant of Venice. Writer Douglas J. Keating of the Inquirer Theatre Critic commends Leiren-Young for making “it clear what he thinks about the issues surrounding The Merchant of Venice while presenting “the controversy about its performance and censorship fully and fairly”. Its clutter-free set creates an intimate, relatable setting, while its dialogue is praised for adeptly engaging the audience with wit and humor. The Vancouver Courier calls the work “Dangerous, daring and provocative”. Michael Turner in Canada's National Post deems Shylock “an effective piece of writing” garnering a “lively” and engaged response from audience members. In 1994, Shylock won Second Prize in Canada's National One-Act Playwriting Competition.
