= Mark Leiren-Young =

Writer and performer (born 1962)

- Born: September 4, 1962 (age 63); Vancouver, British Columbia, Canada
- Education: Masters Degree in Creative Writing - University of British Columbia
- Occupations: Playwright, author, filmmaker, director, performer, satirist, podcaster, activist
- Years active: 1985–present
- Notable work: The Killer Whale Who Changed the World, Never Shoot a Stampede Queen, The Green Chain, Shylock, Orcas Everywhere
- Spouse: Rayne Ellycrys Benu
- Awards: Stephen Leacock Memorial Medal for Humour
- Website: leiren-young.com

Mark Leiren-Young (born September 4, 1962) is a Canadian playwright, author, journalist, screenwriter, filmmaker, and performer. He lives in Saanich, British Columbia and is married to Rayne Ellycrys Benu.

== Early life ==
Mark Leiren-Young was born in Vancouver, British Columbia. He spent two years at the University of British Columbia where he wrote extensively for The Ubyssey student newspaper. His first stage play, The Initiation, which he wrote and directed while a UBC student, is the subject of his comic memoir Free Magic Secrets Revealed. He completed his Bachelor of Fine Arts in Theatre and Creative Writing at the University of Victoria and graduated with distinction in 1985. Leiren-Young's first full-time journalism job was at The Williams Lake Tribune, a newspaper in Williams Lake, British Columbia. He left Williams Lake to write and direct Exposé: Sometimes the World's Fair, Sometimes it Ain't a comedy revue about Expo 86 that played for several months at Vancouver's Firehall Theatre (now the Firehalls Arts Centre), and the 1 act play Escape From Fantasy Gardens, a play about then Premier Bill Vander Zalm.

== Career ==
=== Film and television ===
Leiren-Young's documentary, The Hundred-Year-Old Whale (2017), which he wrote and directed, won the 2017 Writers Guild of Canada award for best documentary. The movie explores the life of Granny and the history of our relationship with the Southern resident killer whales. Leiren-Young's first feature film, The Green Chain (2007), which he wrote, directed and produced, explores the issues facing dying logging communities in British Columbia. The movie won the El Prat de Llobregat Award at the 15th Annual Festival Internacional de Cinema de Medi Ambient (FICMA 2008) in Barcelona.

Leiren-Young also has extensive television writing credits, with over 100 hours of produced work.

His love of comic books inspired his work on a number of animated series, including a ReBoot episode parodying The X-Files (details of which were featured in Entertainment Weekly) and Beast Wars: Transformers. He has written for numerous TV shows including PSI Factor: Chronicles of the Paranormal and Blood Ties.

=== Theatre ===
Leiren-Young's plays have been produced in Canada, the United States, Europe, and Australia. His work has been translated into French, Czech and Danish. In 2017 his play Bar Mitzvah Boy was the winner of the Jewish Playwriting Contest of the Jewish Plays Project. The play has been produced in Canada and the U.S. and is being published in 2020 by Playwright's Canada Press. His award-winning Shylock (Anvil Press, 1996), about the tensions surrounding theatre's most famous Jewish character. Shylock has been produced around the world. Leiren-Young frequently collaborated with director John Juliani. The work they developed together included Articles of Faith (Anvil Press, 2001), about the Anglican church's internal struggle over the issue of same sex marriage and Leiren-Young's 1991 radio drama, Dim Sum Diaries, which received international recognition when it debuted on CBC Radio's Morningside. Leiren-Young has frequently written for and about young audiences. His Theatre for Young Audiences scripts include Basically Good Kids (about teens caught up in a riot) and Jim (a solo show about a teen runaway obsessed with The Doors frontman Jim Morrison).

=== Memoirs ===
Twenty years after his stint at The Williams Lake Tribune, Leiren-Young turned his experiences into a comic memoir, Never Shoot A Stampede Queen (Heritage House, 2009), which won the 2009 Stephen Leacock Medal for Humour. Leiren-Young adapted the memoir for stage, where it received its world premiere with the Western Canada Theatre company in Kamloops, British Columbia, Canada in 2013. A second production debuted at Vancouver's Granville Island Stage in May 2013. The book was adapted for the stage by Leiren-Young and directed and dramaturged by TJ Dawe. His latest memoir, Free Magic Secrets Revealed (Harbour Publishing, 2013), tells the story of his high school misadventures staging a disastrous magic show. Leiren-Young is currently adapting both memoirs for film.

=== Journalism ===
Leiren-Young's news and feature writing, humour pieces, reviews, and columns have appeared in a host of publications in Canada and the United States, including Time, Maclean's, and The Utne Reader. He writes a theatre column for The Vancouver Sun. He's a contributor to The Georgia Straight, where he has written since the mid-1980s. He has covered the Toronto International Film Festival for The Georgia Straight for the past ten years. In the fall of 2014, Leiren-Young was appointed editor of Reel West Magazine, a publication focused on the Western Canadian film industry. Leiren-Young also became the University of Victoria's 2014 Harvey Stevenson Southam Lecturer in Journalism and Nonfiction for the Department of Writing, the first alumnus to hold this position.

=== Environmentalism ===
Leiren-Young is a passionate environmentalist. He hosts the Skaana podcast where he interviews experts like Paul Watson, David Suzuki and Elizabeth May about orcas, oceans and the environment. He has written and spoken about how Canada's Trans Mountain Pipeline could lead to the extinction of the endangered Southern resident killer whales. He hosted a podcast for Vancouver's independent online news site The Tyee, where he often addressed issues facing British Columbia's old growth forests. His Tyee interviews provided the content for his book, The Green Chain: Nothing Is Ever Clear Cut (Heritage House, 2009), which examines the logging industry. Described by the National Post as "Canada's go to guy for dolphins, whales and trees", Leiren-Young has also been dubbed "Canada's greenest writer". Many of his projects feature a sustainability theme, such as his award-winning short film, The Green Film, and his feature-length movie, The Green Chain, which stars Tricia Helfer. As half of the comedy duo, "Local Anxiety" with Kevin Crofton, Leiren-Young wrote and co-starred in the EarthVision award-winning TV special, Greenpieces: The World's First Eco-Comedy. He released the 2009 CD Greenpieces, and cuts from the satirical album are often featured on CBC Radio. He also coauthored This Crazy Time: Living our Environmental Challenge (Knopf Canada, 2012) with controversial Canadian environmentalist, Tzeporah Berman. In 2012, Leiren-Young debuted Greener Than Thou, a comic, autobiographical monologue detailing the journey of "going green".

=== Moby Doll ===
In October 2014, Leiren-Young wrote the article "Moby Doll" for The Walrus. The Walrus feature tells the story of the first killer whale displayed in captivity, Moby Doll, who was harpooned in the summer of 1964 off the coast of British Columbia's Saturna Island. Moby Doll survived just eighty-seven days in a waterfront pen but, during that time, changed the world's attitude towards orcas. The Walrus article was a finalist for the 2015 National Magazine Awards. Leiren-Young wrote Moby Doll: The Whale that Changed the World, which aired as a radio broadcast November 7, 2014 on CBC Radio's Ideas with Paul Kennedy. The documentary won the 2014 Jack Webster Award for Best Feature Story in radio for the broadcast. In 2016, the book The Killer Whale Who Changed the World was published. It spent four weeks on the Maclean's bestseller list and was long-listed for the 2017 RBC Taylor Prize, and short-listed for the Hubert Evans Prize. It was the winner of the Science Writers and Communicators of Canada award for the best "general interest" book.

A feature-length film documentary of The Killer Whale Who Changed the World is currently in post-production (2020). The movie is set to be distributed by Kinosmith (the Canadian distributors of Blackfish).

=== Awards ===
Leiren-Young won the 2017 Writers Guild of Canada Award for Best Documentary for his movie, The Hundred-Year-Old Whale. He has received three other Writers Guild of Canada nominations for his work in radio and film. He received the 2017 Bron Iris Award in 2017 for his "commitment to the promotion of female creators" in film and television. He won the 2009 Stephen Leacock Memorial Medal for Humour for his comic memoir, "Never Shoot a Stampede Queen." Leiren-Young was the 1993 recipient of a National Magazine award for his Theatrum column and has received two Western Magazine Awards, the latest presented in 2013.

== Credits ==
=== Books by Mark Leiren-Young ===
- Never Shoot A Stampede Queen - 2009
- The Green Chain: Nothing is Ever Clear Cut - 2009
- This Crazy Time: Living our environmental challeng - 2011
- Free Magic Secrets Revealed - 2013
- The Killer Whale Who Changed the World - 2016
- Orcas Everywhere - 2019
- Big Whales, Small World - 2020
- Orcas of the Salish Sea - 2020
- Bar Mitzvah Boy - 2020
- Sharks Forever - 2022
- Big Sharks, Small World - 2022

=== Film ===
- The Green Chain (2007, feature) - Writer/Director/Producer
- The Hundred-Year-Old Whale (2017, short) - Writer/Director/Producer
- The Green Film (short) – writer, (2008)

=== Television ===
- ReBoot: The Guardian Code (TV series) - writer,
- RollBots (TV series) – writer, (200
- Blood Ties (Lifetime series) - Story editor and writer, (2007)
- Pucca (TV series) – writer, (2007)
- Class of the Titans (TV series) – writer, (2007)
- The Collector (TV series) - writer, (2006)
- Ace Lightning (TV series) – writer, (2002–2004)
- The Great Canadian Music Dream (CBC miniseries) - writer, (2003)
- Mentors (TV series) - writer, (2001)
- Psi Factor - writer, (2000)
- Life and Times: The Brian Orser Story - writer, (2000)
- Greenpieces (TV special short), (2000)
- Grand Illusions: The Story of Magic (TV series), (1998)
- The 27th Annual Juno Awards – (1998)
- Transformers: Beast Wars (TV series) – writer, (1997)
- ReBoot - writer, (1996)
- Jonovision (CBC) - writer, (1996)

=== Theatre ===
- Bar Mitzvah Boy - 2017
- Never Shoot a Stampede Queen - 2013
- Articles of Faith - 2001
- Easy Money - 1999
- If You Really Love Me... - 2000
- Shylock - 1996
- Basically Good Kids - 1993
- Blueprints From Space - 1993
- Dim Sum Diaries - 1991
- Jim - 1990
- Escape from Fantasy Gardens - 1989
- Watchin' - 1986

=== Music ===
- Greenpieces - Local Anxiety - 2009
- Hockey Nut in Canada - Local Anxiety - 2007
- Forgive Us - We're Canadian - Local Anxiety - 2003
- Is Nothing Sacred? Local Anxiety - 1992
