= Granny (orca) =

Resident orca known for her long life

J2 Granny
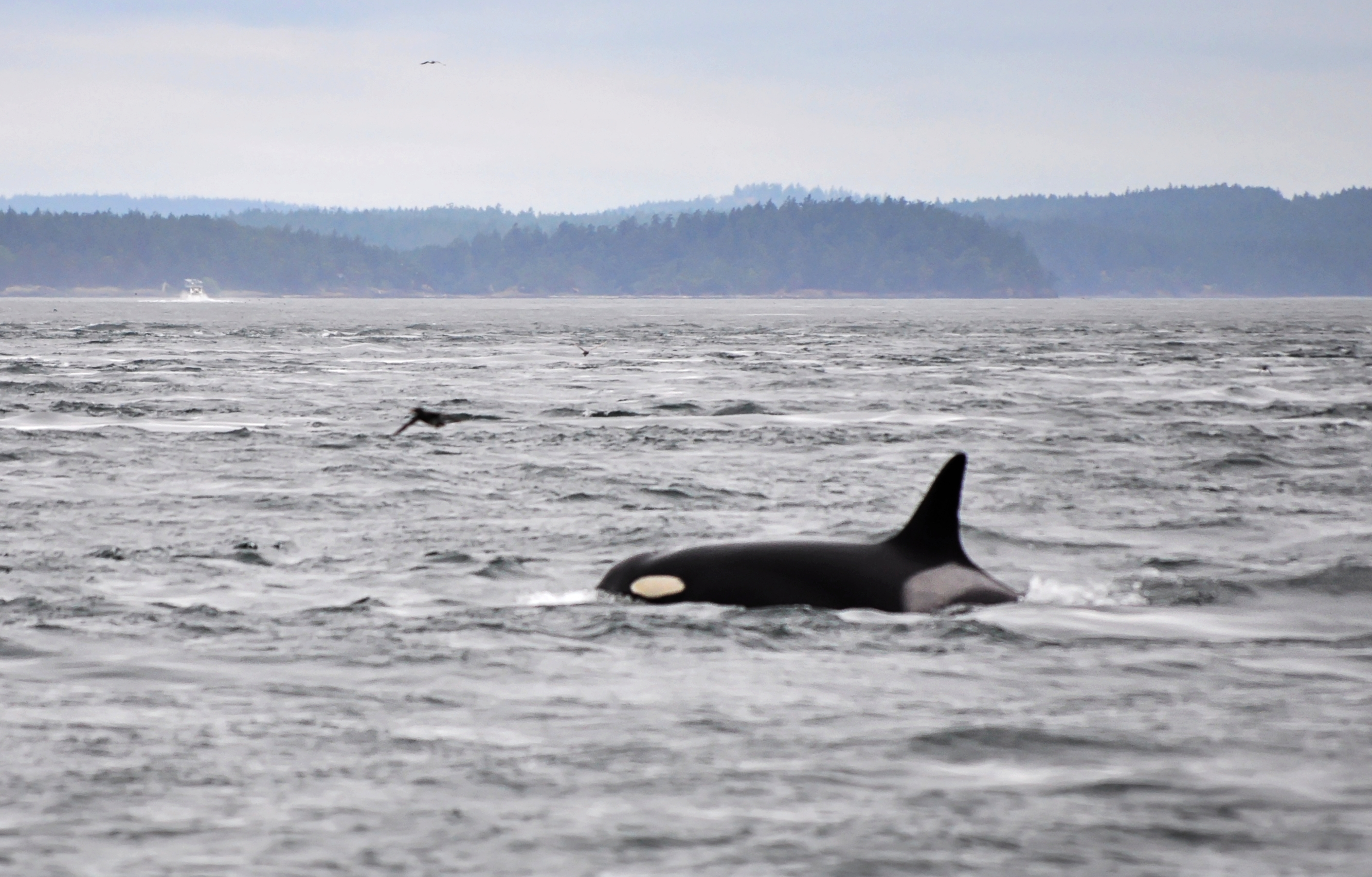
- Species: Orca (Orcinus orca)
- Sex: Female
- Born: c. 1936–1951
- Died: c. October–December 2016 (aged 65–80)
- Known for: Long life
- Appearance: Gray "saddle patch" behind dorsal fin; half-moon notch in dorsal fin

Granny (born c. 1936-1951 approx, died c. 2016), also known as J2, was a female orca of the J pod of southern resident orcas notable for her long life. Early estimates placed her birth in 1911, putting her at 105 years old at the time of her death. However, this estimate was later theorized to have been based on mistaken information and more recent studies put her at 65–80 years old. If she was 105, she would have been the oldest known orca at the time of her death. Granny lived in the northeast Pacific Ocean and coastal bays of Washington state and British Columbia. She was last seen on October 12, 2016, and was considered deceased by The Center for Whale Research in January 2017.

== Description ==
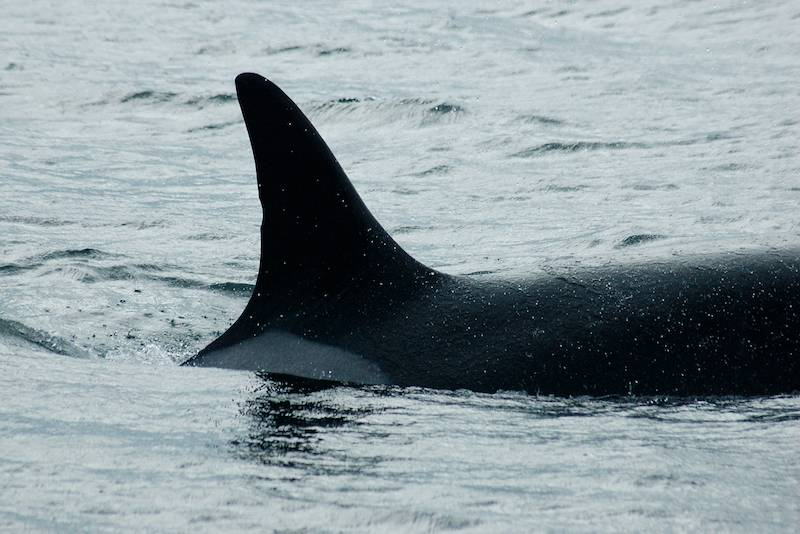
The unique dorsal fin of J2 Granny, showing her half-moon notch, taken as she swam through Haro Strait in Washington State in 2007

Granny was recognizable from the gray "saddle patch" just behind her dorsal fin, and a half-moon notch in her fin. Simon Pidcock of Ocean EcoVentures said he had seen Granny thousands of times, and that the markings on orca fins were like fingerprints.

Granny had been captured with the rest of her pod in 1967 but was too old at that time for a marine mammal park and was released.

Now that orca studies have been conducted for several decades, the exact age of many younger animals is known. The age of older orcas, such as Granny, is estimated by their offspring; they give birth around age 15, and stop having offspring around 40; by adding the generations together, ages can be estimated. Granny was photographed in 1971 with a male orca, J1 Ruffles, who was believed at the time to be her son. Ruffles was estimated as at least 20 years old, and as scientists believed him to be Granny's last offspring, her own age was estimated at about 60. It was later discovered that Ruffles was not Granny's son, but her age estimate was never changed. Granny's age was originally estimated with a margin of error of 12 years, but was the subject of an academic dispute in 2016 due to her original age being based on evidence now known to be incorrect, as well as a large disparity between the life expectancy of orcas with estimated ages and orcas with known ages. Analysis of fatty acids from a recent biopsy of Granny indicated that Granny may have only been 65–80 years of age.

== J pod ==
Granny, along with several of her descendants, travelled in the J pod, a group of about 25 orcas. J pod, along with Pods K and L, are the "J clan", which constitute the entire southern resident population. They frequent the inland waters of British Columbia and Washington state in the summer months, but roam from southeast Alaska to central California. They have completed a journey as far as 800 miles (1,300 km) in a week. As the oldest female in J pod, Granny would have been considered its matriarch.

A well-known male orca previously thought to be Granny's son is J1 Ruffles. He was last seen in late 2010. As of 2012, none of Granny's immediate children are known to be living. However, Granny had multiple grandchildren and great-grandchildren who travelled in the pod with her.

The southern resident orcas are the most studied population of orcas in the world. Many in this population were captured in the 1960s and 1970s for use in aquariums and ocean parks, and others were killed by hunters attempting to capture them. The southern resident orcas are the smallest of four resident communities from the northeastern portion of the Pacific Ocean. It is the only orca population listed as endangered by the U.S. Fish & Wildlife Service, and as of 2005 this group is protected under the Endangered Species Act.

== Legacy ==
As one of the longest living known orcas, Granny is employed as an example in arguments against keeping orcas in captivity, referring to the allegedly reduced lifespan of captive animals. As of 2026, the oldest captive orca is Corky, who has been in captivity since 1969. The average lifespan for a captive orca is 20 to 30 years. Of Granny's age, Captain Pidcock of Ocean Ecoventures Whale Watching said "[...] it’s mind-blowing to think that this whale is over 100 years old. She was born before the Titanic went down. Can you imagine the things she’s seen in her lifetime?"

Granny was also used as a focal point of environmental efforts that resulted in the Endangered Species Act protections for orca. Environmentalists estimate that Granny may have had a PCB load of up to 100 parts per million, and that her descendants' reproductive systems may have been damaged by exposure to pollution. Granny was featured in a children's book on orcas by Sally Hodson titled Granny's Clan: A Tale of Wild Orcas.

Shortly after Granny's death was announced, BBC Radio 4's Inside Science discussed the insights into orcas and their social lives which the prolonged observations of Granny and her pod had revealed.

Granny is the subject of a short documentary film. The Hundred Year Old Whale was released in 2017 by filmmaker Mark Leiren-Young, the author of The Killer Whale Who Changed The World.

== Orca lifespan ==
Estimates of lifespans for wild orcas vary. SeaWorld says wild lifespans are 30–50 years for females, and 19–30 years for males. This is consistent with a 2021 study of the lifespans of wild north Pacific killer whales, with resident females living from 34-52 years and male residents living from 19-34 years on average.

These estimates depart from the findings of a 2005 study, which pegged the mean age of females at 45.8 years and males at 31.0 during the period between 1973 and 1996. Marine conservation groups argue that even these estimates are low due to the effects of hunting, pollution, and capture on the wild populations, and that natural wild orca lifespans are equivalent to that of humans, with male orcas living up to 75 years and female orcas living up to 80 years.

Orcas are one of the few species to exhibit menopause and Granny's great age gave her a chance to use her skills to enhance the reproductive success of her offspring (see Grandmother hypothesis).

== See also ==
- List of individual cetaceans
