= The Whale Museum =

- Established: 1 January 1979
- Location: Friday Harbor, Washington
- Coordinates: 48.5357°N 123.0173°W
- Type: Natural History
- Website: http://www.whalemuseum.org

The Whale Museum is a natural history museum in Friday Harbor, Washington. Founded in 1979, it is dedicated to interpreting whales in the wild. Its mission is to promote the stewardship of wild whales in the Salish Sea ecosystem through education and research programs.

== Exhibits ==
The Whale Museum's exhibits include life-sized whale models, articulated skeletons, information on the endangered Southern Resident killer whales' family groups (pods), and current scientific research on local species. Other exhibits feature pinnipeds, porpoises and other marine mammals of the Salish Sea, wildlife videos, and Northwest Native American culture and artifacts relating to marine mammals. The whale museum is actively involved in stewardship efforts and was involved in the orca Springer's story, and the investigation of Sooke (L-112), a 3-year-old orca who washed up near Long Beach, Washington in 2012.

== Education and Research ==
The Whale Museum conducts several research and education programs:

- The Whale Sighting Network has recorded whale sightings in the Salish Sea and kept a database of reported sightings since 1976. Sightings are submitted by members of the public via the toll-free Whale Hotline.
- The Marine Mammal Stranding Network was started in 1981, and is authorized by NOAA to investigate reports of stranded marine mammals, alive or dead. Some live animals are taken for rehabilitation at Wolf Hollow Wildlife Rehabilitation Center, and some dead specimens are studied at University of Washington Friday Harbor Labs by researchers to help gather information about the health of local populations and the ecosystem.
- The Whale Museum is also a partner in the Salish Sea Hydrophone Network, SeaSound. The hydrophones detect whale vocalizations, vessel noise and other underwater sounds in the area. The Whale Museum mainly uses the hydrophone off Lime Kiln Point State Park, where they have maintained a research laboratory since 1983.
- The Orca Adoption Program helps members of the public learn more about the Southern Resident Killer Whales, including their individual markings, genealogy, and facts about their lives.
- Education programs are conducted for both children and adults. Programs include Southern Resident Killer Whales, Whale Acoustics Lab, The Gray Whale Project, Cetaceans of the Salish Sea, The Orca ID Lab and Puget Pinnipeds.
- The Marine Naturalist Training Program, held twice a year, is an in-depth review of the natural history of the Salish Sea.
- Soundwatch is a boater education program conducted in 1993 to teach boaters and kayakers about federal and state laws regarding vessel operations near whales, and to promote the Be Whale Wise boating guidelines.

The Whale Museum is a 501(c)(3) non-profit organization governed by a board of directors.
