= Scarlet (orca) =

Southern resident orca

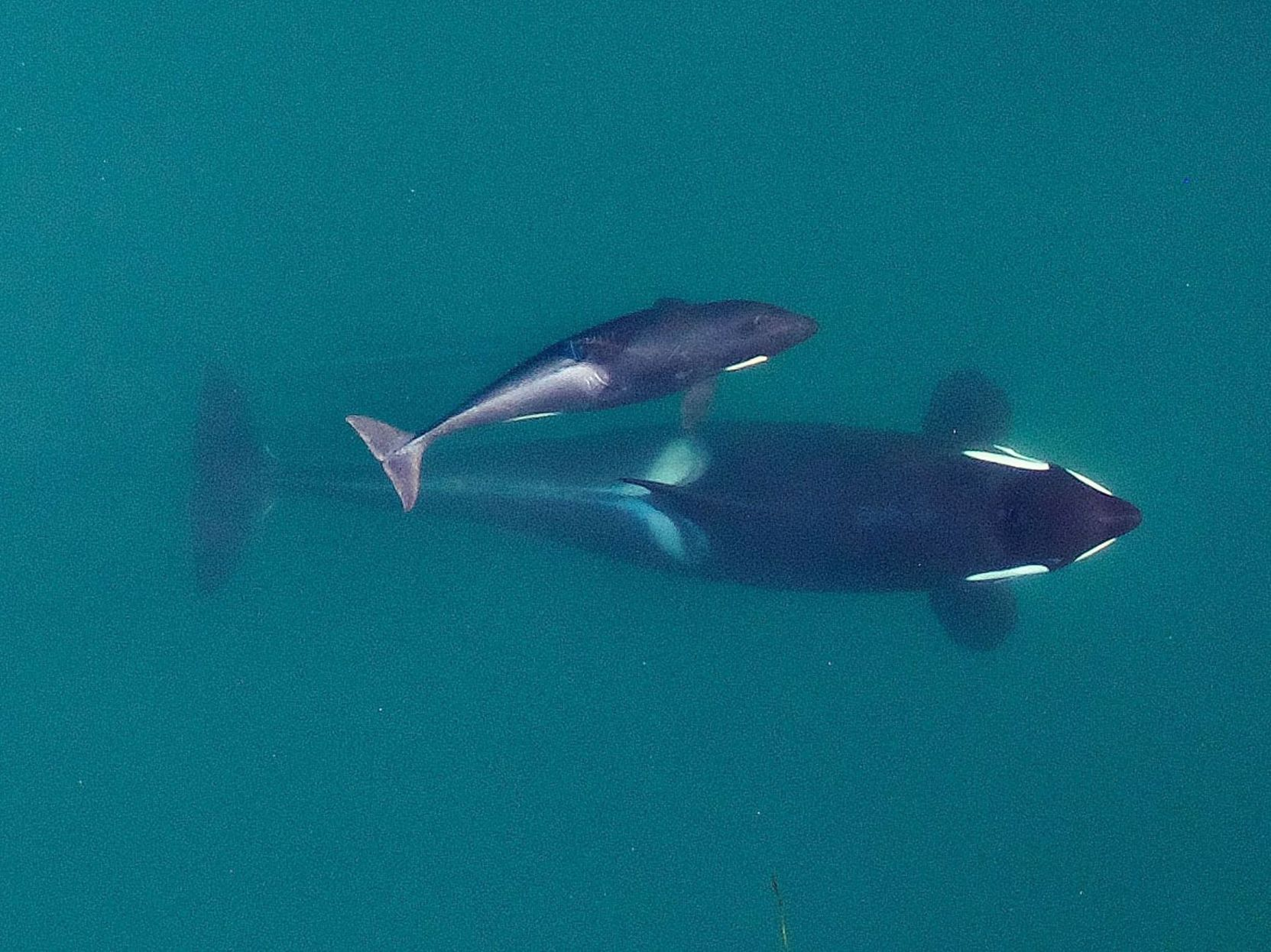
J50 and her mother, J16, in September 2015

J50 Scarlet was a juvenile female member of the endangered southern resident orca community in British Columbia and Washington state. She was born near South Pender Island, British Columbia around Christmas Day, 2014. In late June, 2018, Scarlet appeared emaciated and was feared near death. Another calf died in late July, 2018 leaving Scarlet "represent[ing] the future" of the declining Southern Residents, thought to number 75, cut off from their food supply of Puget Sound chinook salmon, themselves listed as a threatened species. Scarlet's mother, known as J16, was born in 1972.

In August 2018, the Lummi Nation, a federally recognized tribe with treaty rights to salmon, announced a plan to feed Scarlet from their own chinook catch. Beginning in early August, marine veterinarians delivered doses of antibiotics via a dart gun. The idea of feeding her medicated fish was also under consideration.

On September 13, 2018, Ken Balcomb, the senior scientist and president of the Center for Whale Research on San Juan Island in Washington state, said Scarlet was probably dead, though her remains had yet to be discovered.

== See also ==
- List of individual cetaceans
