= Orca attacks =

List of attacks of humans

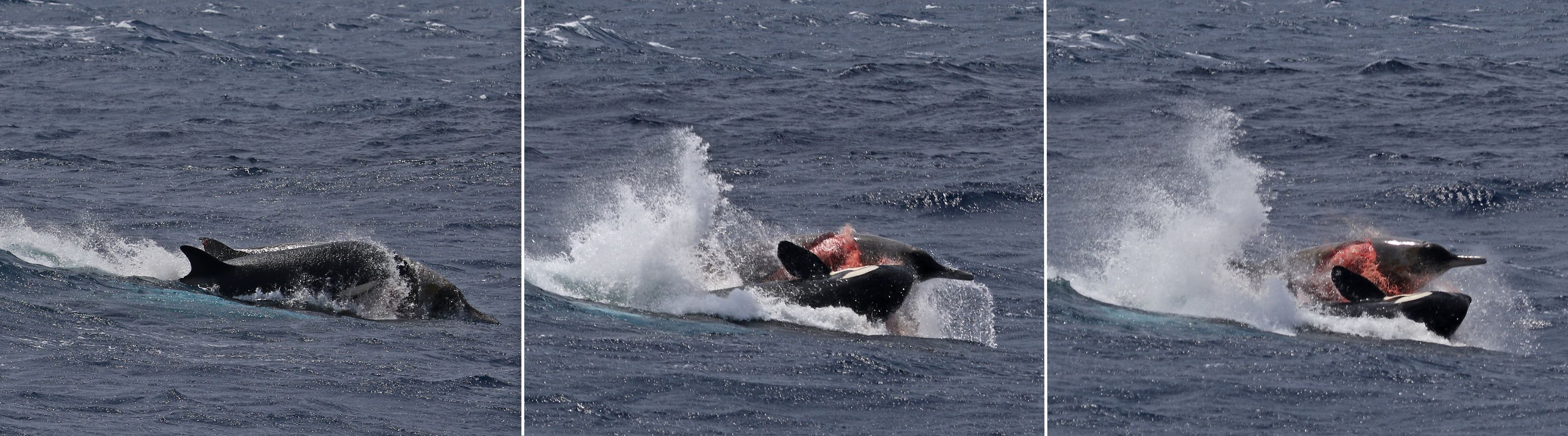
An attack on a strap-toothed whale

Orcas are large, powerful aquatic apex predators. There have been incidents where orcas were perceived to attack humans in the wild, but such attacks are less common than those by captive orcas. In captivity, there have been several non-fatal and four fatal attacks on humans since the 1990s. Experts are divided as to whether the injuries and deaths were accidental or deliberate attempts to cause harm.

== Incidents with wild orcas ==
There are recorded cases of wild orcas engaging in possibly threatening behavior towards humans, but there have been no confirmed fatalities.

=== 1910s ===
In the early 1910s, on Robert Falcon Scott's Terra Nova Expedition, one member of the expedition recorded how orcas had attempted to tip ice floes on which photographer Herbert Ponting and a sled dog team were standing.

=== 1950s ===
There are anecdotal reports, c. 1955, of an Inuk man who fell prey to an orca entrapped by ice in Grand Suttie Bay (Foxe Basin, Canada). A pod of orcas, likely 10–12 individuals, was trapped in a polynya, and a young man visited the site in spite of advice from elders to wait as the ice was unsafe to hold his weight. Two Inuit elders stated to a research team how one of the animals chased the young man, broke the ice under him, then killed and ate him. However, the researchers were not able to directly confirm this, as one of the elders clearly stated that he had not witnessed the event himself. The other elder did not clarify whether he had seen this incident happen. As the ice thickened, two to three whales were taken by Inuit hunters, and three more were harpooned but tore the lines (made of seal skin). The rest of the pod likely died of starvation or drowned.

In 1958, an orca attacked the fishing boat Tiger Shark after being struck with a harpoon off the coast of Long Island. The whale was able to get free and chased the vessel for some time. At one point the orca lifted the boat "clear out of the water".

=== 1970s ===
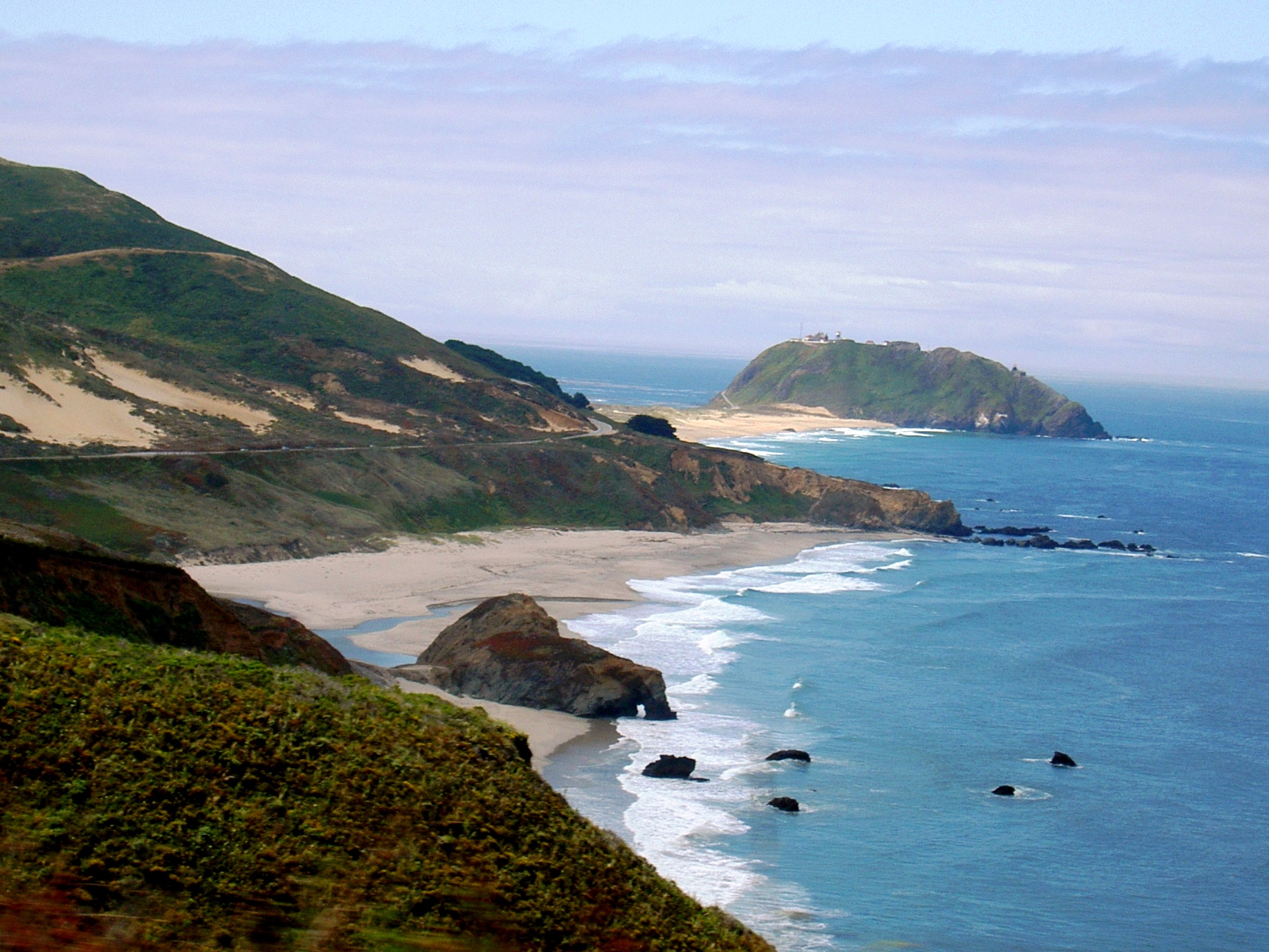
Point Sur, seen from the north on Highway 1

On June 15, 1972, the hull of the 13-metre-long (43 ft) wooden schooner Lucette was damaged by what was identified as a pod of orcas and sank approximately 320 kilometres (200 mi) west of the Galapagos Islands. Dougal Robertson and his family of five escaped to an inflatable life raft and a dinghy.

On September 9, 1972, Californian surfer Hans Kretschmer reported being bitten by an orca at Point Sur; most maintain that this remains the only fairly well-documented instance of a wild orca biting a human. His wounds required 100 stitches. Because Kretschmer was wearing a black wetsuit and several sea lions were spotted in the area where the encounter took place, experts believe it was a case of mistaken identity.

On March 9, 1976, the Italian racing yacht Guia III was rammed and sunk by an orca off the coast of Brazil. The vessel was hit once by an individual out of a pod of four to five orcas. The crew of six successfully escaped to a liferaft. The whales showed no reaction to the escaping humans a few meters away from them.

=== 1980s ===
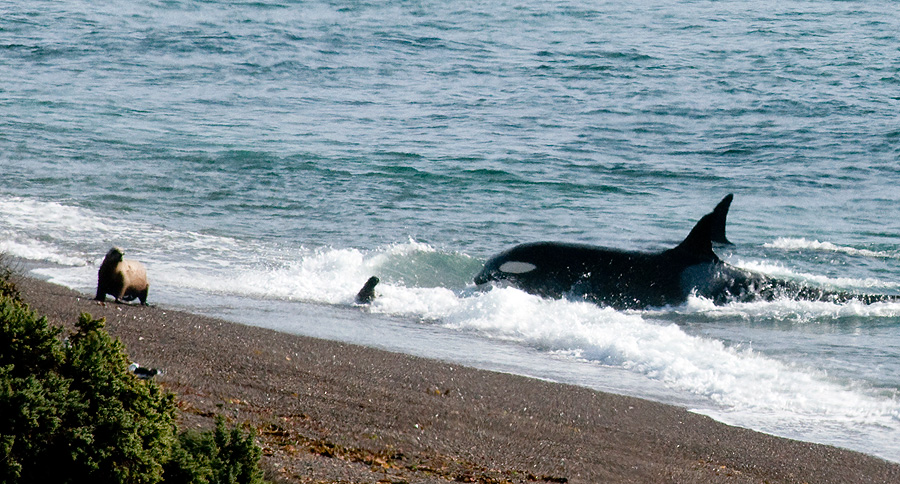
An orca beaching to capture sea lion on the beach of Valdés Peninsula

In 1989 American researcher Bernd Würsig published an article about having been attacked by an orca on a beach of the Valdés Peninsula in Argentina. A single individual, possibly as big as 9 metres (30 ft), beached towards him while he was watching sea lions about 200 metres (650 ft) away from him in hopes of taking a photograph of an orca hunt. Dr Würsig ran up the beach after the orca missed him by about 1 metre. He speculated that the whale might have mistaken him for a seal.

=== 2000s ===
In August 2005, while swimming in four feet of water in Helm Bay, near Ketchikan, Alaska, a 12-year-old boy named Ellis Miller was bumped in the shoulder by a 7.6-metre (25 ft) transient orca. The boy was not bitten or injured in any way. The bay is frequented by harbor seals, and it is possible that the whale misidentified him as prey.

=== 2010s ===
During the filming of the third episode of the BBC documentary Frozen Planet (2011), a group of orcas were filmed trying to swamp the film crew's 5.5-metre (18 ft) zodiac boat with waves during filming. The crew had earlier taped the group hunting seals in the same fashion. It was not mentioned if any of the crew were hurt in the encounter. The crew described the orcas as being very tolerant of the film makers' presence. Over the course of 14 days they filmed over 20 different attacks on seals, many of which the film series producer Vanessa Berlowitz described as training exercises for the young calves in the group.

On February 10, 2014, a free diver in Horahora Estuary near Whangarei, New Zealand, was pulled down for over 40 seconds by an orca which grabbed a bag containing crayfish and urchins that was tethered to the diver. The rope eventually came free. He then undid his weight belt and returned to the surface. He had lost all feeling in his arm and could no longer swim, but his cousin was nearby and helped him float to some rocks where the feeling in his arm returned. Local whale rescuer Jo Halliday thought the incident was more like a potential entanglement than an attack. She said, "I think it's been a pure accident and not an attack of any kind. I'd say the animal has panicked from the feel of the line and the man got dragged along with it." When the rope became undone, the orca did not attack but rather moved away.

=== 2020s ===
From 2020 to 2024, there were at least five hundred reports of orcas interacting with boats off the Atlantic coast of Spain and Portugal, an unusual and unprecedented behaviour. Some of these interactions involved orcas touching or damaging boats. The nudging, biting and ramming attacks concentrated on the rudders of medium-size sailing vessels sailing at moderate speed, with some impacts on the hulls. A small group of orcas were believed to be responsible, with three juveniles which have been named black Gladis, white Gladis, and grey Gladis identified as present for most attacks. No people were injured. The Portuguese coastguard banned small sailing vessels from a region where several incidents had been reported. It is thought by some that the behavior was playful, rather than aggressive or vengeful. However, Gibraltar-based marine biologist Eric Shaw argued that the orcas were displaying protective behaviors and were intentionally targeting the rudder with the understanding that it would immobilize the vessel, just as attacking the tail of a prey animal would immobilize it, a documented predation behavior.

== Incidents with captive orcas ==
There have been many attacks on humans by captive orcas, with four fatalities; three were by the same orca, Tilikum.

=== 1960s ===
- In 1968, a young female orca, Lupa, of the New York Aquarium chased her trainers out of the tank, snapping her jaws threateningly; trainers were cleaning the tank at the time.
- In 1969, adult female orca Kianu pinned trainer William Allen to the side of her tank, and had to be pushed off him with a pole by an assistant; in another incident with the same trainer, Kianu threw Allen off her back and chased him out of the pool, her mouth open.

=== 1970s ===
- In 1970, Cuddles, a male orca (originally believed to be a female) kept in Flamingo Park (now Flamingo Land) in England, attacked his attendants twice, and became so generally aggressive that they were forced to clean his pool from the safety of a shark cage.
- On April 20, 1971, SeaWorld secretary Annette Eckis was talked into riding the park's main attraction, a 10-year-old female orca named Shamu (the original by that name), at the park in San Diego, California, as a publicity stunt. As the ride was coming to an end, Eckis was suddenly thrown off the orca's back. The orca seized the woman by her leg and began pushing her through the water. Trainers on the side of the tank grabbed the young woman and attempted to pull her out of the pool, but the orca again grabbed her leg and refused to let go. Shamu's jaws had to be pried apart with a pole to free Eckis, who was carried away on a stretcher and required 25 stitches to close her wounds. Eckis later sued SeaWorld, but a monetary award was overturned on appeal.
- In 1971, Cuddles, mentioned above, grabbed Dudley Zoo director Donald Robinson while being fed, dragging him to the bottom of the pool and causing head and leg injuries.
- In 1971, trainer Chris Christiansen received 7 stitches in his cheek after young male orca Hugo closed his mouth on Christiansen's head.
- In 1972, Cuddles at the Dudley Zoo hospitalized trainer Roy Lock with a broken nose after the orca put too much force into a trick in which he "kissed" his trainer.
- During the summer of 1972, two trainers at Seven Seas Marine Life Park were bitten on the head by the park's orca Nootka. Larry Lawrence sustained minor injuries on his scalp, while Bob Peek sustained a more serious laceration over his eye.
- In the early 1970s, a Marine World/Africa USA trainer, Jeff Pulaski, while riding a young female orca Kianu during a performance, was thrown off and chased out of the tank. At the same park, an unidentified trainer was seized by the young male Orky II and held at the bottom of the tank until the man nearly lost consciousness.
- In the early 1970s, trainer Manny Velasco recalls both Hugo and Lolita of the Miami Seaquarium becoming aggressive, lunging and snapping at the trainers standing on the central work-island, ending the day's training.
- In the early 1970s, during a waterwork session, orca Hugo refused to allow trainer Chip Kirk to get out of the water, Kirk explained to a journalist from the Palm Beach Post. Hugo bit him on the arm badly enough to leave a scar, which Kirk showed to the reporter. Hugo also grabbed trainer Bob Pulaski by the wetsuit and began thrashing him. Pulaski struggled, but it only made things worse. Hugo's tank-mate Lolita then joined in and began a tug-of-war with Hugo. Pulaski managed to free himself from the tangled wetsuit and get to safety. Pulaski did not mention if he sustained any injuries.
- In the early 1970s, director of training at Sea-Arama Marineworld Ken Beggs claimed that one of the park's orcas, a young male named Mamuk, attempted to bite his torso.
- In the early 1970s, young female orca Nootka became aggressive towards a visiting reporter at Seven Seas Marine Life Park, beaching herself in an attempt to lunge at him. She had to be returned to her pool with a crane. On another occasion, trainer Larry Lawrence was raked by Nootka, needing 145 stitches in his left leg.
- On May 2, 1978, another Marineland of the Pacific trainer, 27-year-old Jill Stratton, was nearly drowned when 10-year-old Orky II suddenly grabbed her and dragged her to the bottom of the tank, holding her there for nearly four minutes.
- On May 22, 1978, SeaWorld trainer Greg Williams was bitten on the legs by the park's orca Winston. He was hospitalized with minor injuries.
- In the 1970s, a Marine World California trainer, Dave Worcester, was dragged to the bottom of the tank by the park's young male orca Nepo.
- In the 1970s, a Vancouver Aquarium trainer, Doug Pemberton, recalls that, "Skana once showed her dislike by dragging a trainer around the pool. Her teeth sank into his wetsuit but missed his leg." Pemberton described both young female Skana and her male companion Hyak II as "moody" but stated that Skana was the dominant animal in the pool. "She is capable of changing moods in minutes".

=== 1980s ===
- On February 23, 1984, a 7-year-old female orca by the name of Kandu V grabbed a SeaWorld California trainer, Joanne Hay, and pinned her against a tank wall during a performance. Hay was only released after another trainer jammed a fist into the whale's blowhole.
- In November 1986, trainer Mark Beeler was held against a wall by Kandu V during a live performance.
- On March 4, 1987, 20-year-old SeaWorld San Diego trainer Jonathan Smith was grabbed by one of the park's 5.4-tonne (6-short-ton) orcas. The orca dragged the trainer to the bottom of the tank, then carried him back to the surface and spat him out.
- On November 21, 1987, trainer John Sillick was riding on the back of a female orca when Orky II, a five-ton male, jumped and landed upon him. Sillick had to have multiple surgeries; his back, hips, pelvis, ribs, and legs were severely fractured. The incident led to the firing of SeaWorld's president and 3 other employees. In an interview, he said, "I'm learning to walk again."
- On April 1, 1989, Nootka IV of Sealand of the Pacific in Victoria, British Columbia, pulled her trainer, Henriette Huber, into the whale tank after the 6-year-old female bit down while the trainer had her hand in Nootka's mouth in order to scratch the whale's tongue. Huber needed several stitches in order to close her wounds.
- Also in 1989 at Sealand of the Pacific, Nootka IV grabbed a tourist's camera that was accidentally dropped into her tank. Head trainer Steve Huxter attempted to retrieve the camera but was pulled into the pool when the orca refused to give up what she likely considered to be her new toy. The orca grabbed the trainer's leg, but Huxter was pulled to safety by fellow trainer Eric Walters.

=== 1990s ===
- On February 20, 1991, at Sealand of the Pacific in Victoria, British Columbia, trainer Keltie Byrne fell into the tank. Nootka IV rushed over, grabbed her foot, and pulled her into the water. According to eyewitness reports, orcas Haida II and Tilikum, who were also in the tank, repeatedly grabbed Byrne, who ultimately drowned. She was pushed and thrown around the pool; all three animals barred her escape, continuously blocking her path and dragging her back into the center of the tank. It was several hours before Byrne's body could be recovered. Sealand of the Pacific closed soon after the incident and sold all of their orcas to the SeaWorld franchise; Haida II and her calf Kyuquot (who was born after the incident) were both moved to SeaWorld Texas. Haida II died in 2001. Nootka IV and Tilikum were both transferred to the SeaWorld in Florida. Nootka IV died in 1994 and Tilikum in 2017. Tilikum was directly responsible for another trainer's death in 2010. Haida II and Nootka IV were both pregnant by Tilikum at the time of the incident.
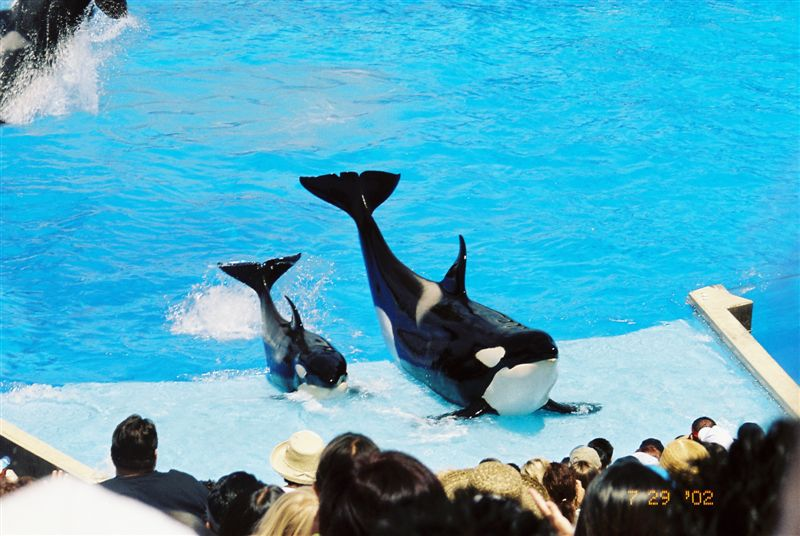
  Kasatka and her son Nakai posing during a show in 2002
- In 1993, 17-year-old female Kasatka tried to bite an unidentified SeaWorld California trainer.
- On June 12, 1999, 23-year-old Kasatka grabbed her trainer Ken Peters by the leg and attempted to throw him from the pool during a public show at SeaWorld San Diego.
- On July 5, 1999, at SeaWorld Orlando Florida, a South Carolina man, Daniel Dukes, was found dead in one of the orca tanks, naked and draped across the back of the park's largest male orca, Tilikum. An autopsy revealed that he had drowned. He was covered in bruises, abrasions, bite marks consistent with orca bites, and his genitals had been bitten off and eaten by Tilikum, indicating that Tilikum had had contact with the victim, though it could not be established whether or not Tilikum actually caused the man's death. Dukes had apparently hidden in the park until after closing, evaded security, then entered the orca tank. He had been reported by Seaworld staff to have "dived" with other sea mammals. The autopsy found no drugs in his system. No SeaWorld admission ticket was found. Staff emphasized that he had to deliberately climb over a 91-centimetre (3 ft) Plexiglas barrier and several guardrail fences and descend the steps into the 24 m × 30 m (80 ft × 100 ft) tank.

=== 2000s ===
- On July 8, 2002, Tamarie Tollison, a 28-year-old trainer, was hospitalized for a compound fracture of the forearm as well as several lesser injuries after an incident occurred in Shamu Stadium at SeaWorld San Diego. She was working poolside with two of the park's orcas, Orkid and Splash. "She was playing with the whales, talking to them… the next thing we know, as it appears from the video, she was pulled into the water," said SeaWorld spokesperson Darla Davis. Visitor video shows that the trainer was pulled in by her foot by the female Orkid. Both Orkid and Splash pulled the trainer under as she screamed for help. A fellow trainer took the chain off the gate of an adjoining pool to imply to Orkid and Splash that Kasatka — a more dominant female — was coming in, upon which Orkid, who was holding Tollison at the time, released her and she was able to escape. Park officials stated that she exited the pool without assistance and was taken to a local hospital, where a pin was needed to reset her fractured arm.
- In late July 2004, during a show at the SeaWorld park in San Antonio, Texas, a male orca named Kyuquot repeatedly jumped on top of his trainer, Steve Aibel, forcing him underwater and preventing him from leaving the pool. After several minutes, Aibel was able to calm the animal, and he escaped unharmed.
- On November 15, 2006, SeaWorld San Diego trainer Brian Rokeach was injured when the park's 18-year-old female orca Orkid grabbed him by the foot and pulled him to the bottom of the tank. Orkid let Rokeach go only after heeding fellow trainer Kenneth Peters' repeated attempts to call the animal's attention back to the stage. Rokeach suffered a torn ligament in his ankle but was not taken to the hospital. In response to the incident, SeaWorld increased the number of trainers required during performances and in-water-training to five. However, two weeks later trainer Kenneth Peters was involved in a similar incident (below) with a different orca.
- On November 29, 2006, Kasatka, one of SeaWorld San Diego's seven orcas, grabbed her trainer Ken Peters by the foot and dragged him to the bottom of the tank several times during an evening show at Shamu Stadium. After nine minutes, Kasatka released Peters and he escaped. The orca then followed the trainer, swimming over a netted barrier towards him. This was the second documented incident of Kasatka attacking Peters, and the third most widely reported of all the SeaWorld incidents.
- On September 9, 2008, during a show at Marineland Antibes in France, a 26-year-old female orca named Freya began behaving unusually in the middle of the show, then pulled an unidentified trainer under the water. The trainer resurfaced after a few seconds, then Freya jumped on top of him twice, and began to push him under and through the water. The trainer tried to regain control by climbing on the orca's back, but was thrown off. He eventually managed to get to the edge and climb out, seemingly unhurt.
- In the spring of 2009, a 5-year-old female orca Skyla turned on an unidentified trainer while performing in one of Loro Parque Tenerife's daily shows. Skyla started pushing her trainer through the water and up against the side of the pool. Subsequently, her "water work" was suspended, and only senior trainers are allowed to work with her.
- On December 24, 2009, 29-year-old Alexis Martínez died during a rehearsal for a Christmas Day show at Loro Parque in Spain. The 14-year-old male orca Keto, who was born at SeaWorld Orlando Florida, rammed Martínez in the chest, rendering him unconscious. He drowned before fellow trainers could rescue him. The park repeatedly asserted that this was not an attack but an unfortunate accident caused by boisterous play; however, the park also described Keto as "not... completely predictable." The subsequent autopsy report revealed that Martínez had died from multiple compression fractures and tears to his vital organs, with bite marks all over his body. Martínez was considered one of the most experienced trainers in Loro Parque, having worked there since 2004.

=== 2010s ===
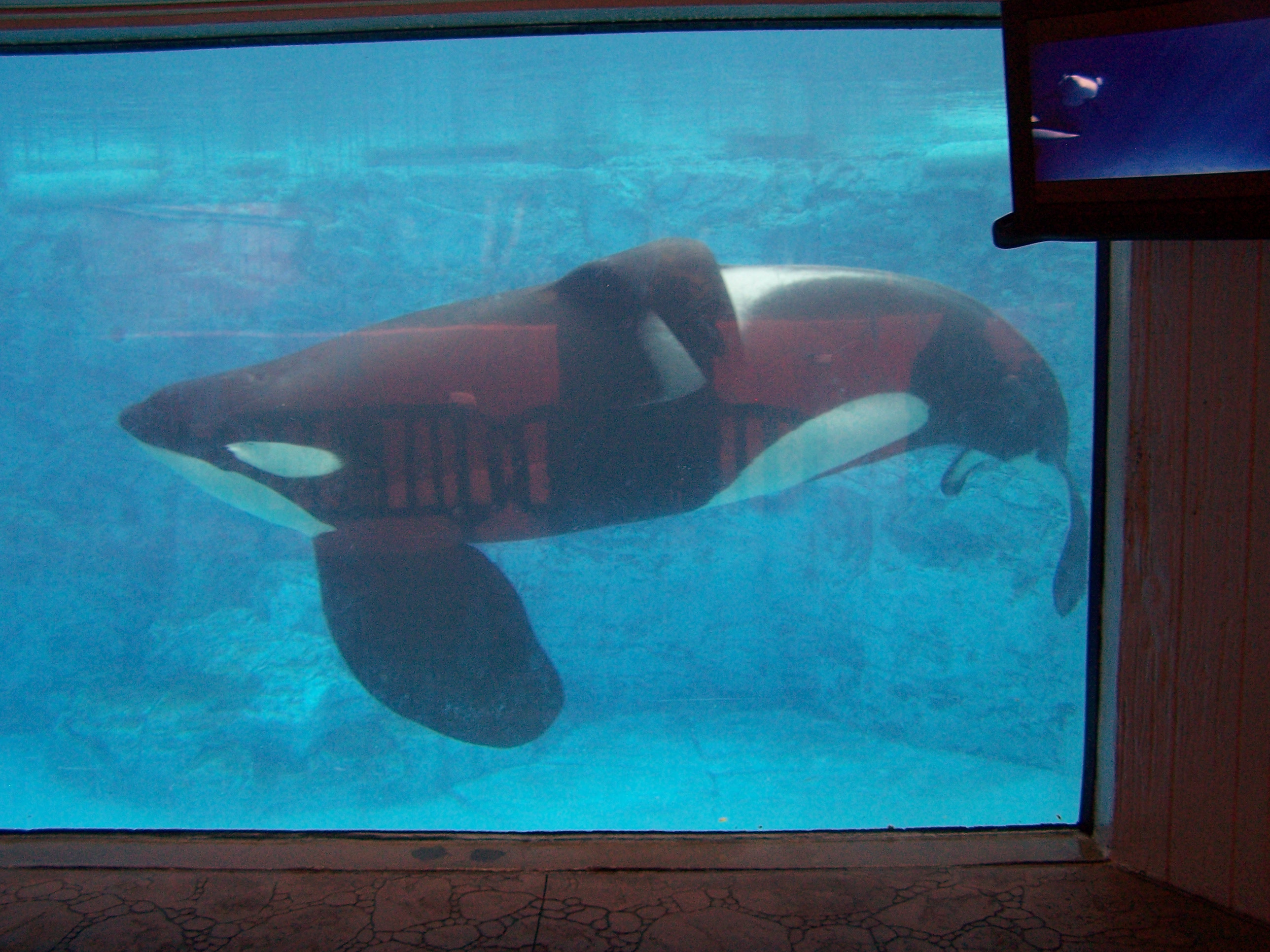
Tilikum, who was involved in 3 deaths, swims in the Dine with Shamu exhibit in Orlando, Florida

- On February 24, 2010, the large Icelandic bull orca Tilikum killed Dawn Brancheau, an experienced trainer, at the end of a "Dine with Shamu" show at SeaWorld Orlando. SeaWorld officials stated that Tilikum grabbed Brancheau by her ponytail and pulled her into the water, drowning her. Eyewitness trainers and audience members, however, stated that Tilikum dragged Brancheau into the water by her forearm. The autopsy determined that the trainer died of "multiple traumatic injuries and drowning". Tilikum was involved in two previous fatalities. He died in 2017, having been the largest breeding male in captivity.
- In July 2012, Shouka, a female orca on a breeding loan to Six Flags Discovery Kingdom from Marineland France, lunged out of the water during a show, throwing her trainer several feet backwards. The orca repeatedly lunged out of the water, attempting to reach her trainer. The incident was caught on video by an audience member. Critics of marine parks have blamed lack of companionship for Shouka's aggression, as she did at one time have a companion bottlenose dolphin named Merlin who was subsequently moved to another area of the park. Shouka was transferred to Sea World San Diego soon after this incident.
- In December 2012, killer whale Lolita (Tokitae) was documented lunging at visitors as she was being filmed from the observation deck.
- In September 2015, a trainer slipped and fell into the show tank during a performance at Moskvarium in Moscow, Russia. The three whales (Narnia, Nord, and Naja) became agitated, and as the trainer climbed out of the water, they thrashed their tails at him; no injuries were reported.

=== 2020s ===
- On June 13, 2022, an unidentified trainer at SeaWorld Orlando was washing "paint and food chips" out of the mouth of the two-and-a-half-ton killer whale, Malia. The trainer was said to have broken the three foot rule and moved her right arm across the whale's mouth when the whale bit down and then "immediately" released the trainer. The trainer was taken to "Orlando Regional Medical Center, where she underwent surgery to repair multiple fractures to the forearm and wrist."

== See also ==
- Orca, a 1977 dramatic film
- Blackfish, a 2013 documentary
- Incidents at SeaWorld parks
