= Alexis Martínez =

Alexis Martínez may refer to:

- Alexis Martínez (sport shooter), Mexican athlete
- Alexis Martínez, Spanish animal trainer, see Death of Alexis Martínez
