= Katina (orca) =

Captive female orca (c. 1975–2025)

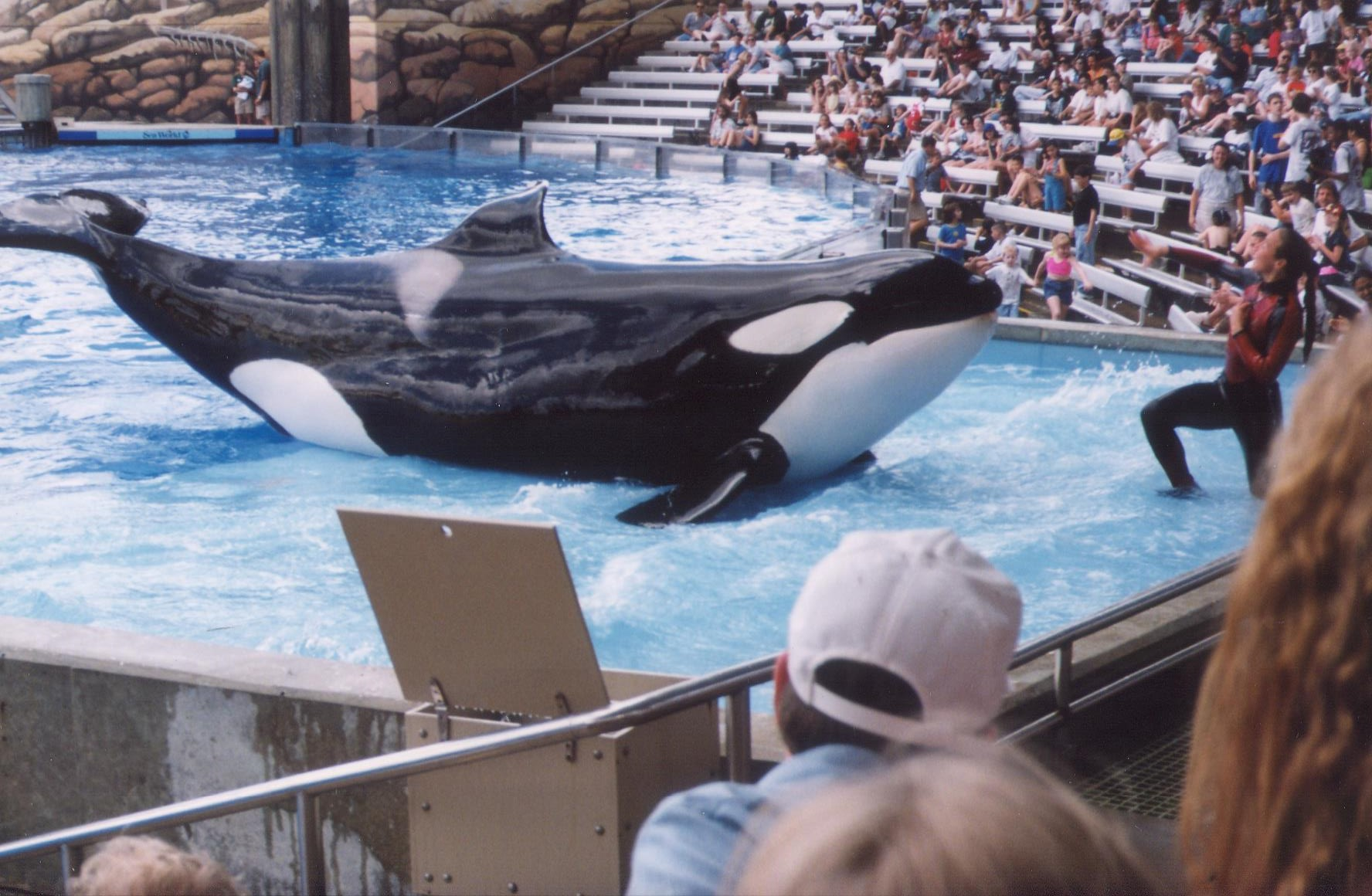
- Katina with trainer Dawn Brancheau in 1998
- Species: Orca (Orcinus orca)
- Breed: Icelandic
- Sex: Female
- Born: c. 1975
- Died: December 20, 2025 (aged ≈50); Seaworld Orlando, Florida, U.S.
- Years active: 1978–2025
- Mates: Ramu III (1966–1986); Kanduke (1971–1990); Tilikum (1981–2017); Taku (1993–2007)
- Offspring: Kalina (daughter) (1985–2010); Katerina (daughter) (1988–1999); Taku (son) (1993–2007); Unna (daughter) (1996–2015); Ikaika (son) (born 2002); Nalani (daughter/granddaughter) (born 2006); Makaio (son) (born 2010)
- Weight: 2,676 kg (5,900 lb)
- Height: 18 ft 0 in (5.49 m)

Katina (c. 1975 – December 20, 2025) was a female orca who lived at SeaWorld Orlando in Florida. She was captured off Iceland at approximately three years of age on 26 October 1978. She was the most successful breeding female orca in captivity. SeaWorld Orlando celebrated her birthday on June 1 every year.

== Transfers ==
Katina was born around 1975. Upon her capture, Katina was purchased by Marineland in Niagara Falls, Ontario, Canada, where she was first named "Kandu 6". She was shipped to the facility soon after. However, she did not spend much time there. Sometime between April and June 1979, Katina was bought by SeaWorld. She was first sent to their park in San Diego. In 1982, Katina was moved to SeaWorld Ohio in Aurora with another female named Kasatka, also captured in Iceland in October 1978. For two years, the two would perform in the Ohio park during the summer months and then be moved back to San Diego for the winter. Finally, in September or October 1984, Katina was transferred to SeaWorld Orlando. She remained there until her death on December 20, 2025.

== Family members ==
Asterisk signifies that the animal is deceased.

- Daughters: Kalina*(1985–2010), Katerina*(1988–1999), Unna*(1996–2015) and Nalani (2006)
- Sons: Taku*(1993–2007), Ikaika (2002), and Makaio (2010)
- Granddaughters: Kalina's stillborn*, Skyla*(2004–2021), Unna's stillborn* and Nalani (2006)
- Grandsons: Keet (1993), Keto* (1995–2024), Tuar (1999), and Trua (2005)
- Unknown grandchildren: Unna's two unconfirmed pregnancies*
- Great-granddaughters: Kalia (2004), Halyn*(2005–2008) Vicky*(2012–2013) and Ula*(2018–2021)
- Great-grandson: Adán (2010)
- Unconfirmed great-grandson: Kayla's miscarriage*
- Unconfirmed great-granddaughter: Unna's stillborn*
- Unconfirmed unknown great-grandchildren: Unna's two unconfirmed pregnancies*
- Great-great-granddaughter: Amaya*(2014–2021)
- Possible relatives: Betty*(1975–1987)

== Birth of Kalina ==
Katina became pregnant in the early spring of 1984 at SeaWorld San Diego. She had mated with a male named Winston, a member of the Southern resident orca community captured near Coupeville, Washington in 1970. Soon afterward, she was moved back to SeaWorld Ohio for the summer. While there, the trainers realized she was pregnant. Because of this, she was moved to Orlando at the end of the summer season.

On September 26, 1985, Katina went into labor. A few hours later, she bore her first calf, a female, who was named Kalina. Although ten orca calves had been born in captivity prior to Kalina, none of them had survived past a few weeks. This made Kalina the first orca calf to be successfully born and raised in captivity, which made Katina the first successful captive mother. Kalina had four offspring of her own and died at SeaWorld Orlando in October 2010.

== Other calves and grandchildren ==
Katina gave birth to seven calves, the first five of whom were separated from her and shipped to other parks. Four have died.

In early 1987, an adult male named Kanduke (c. 1971 – 20 September 1990) arrived in Orlando. He and Katina soon mated. Katina bore her second calf on November 4, 1988. It was another female named Katerina. In early 1991, Katerina was moved to SeaWorld San Antonio. She died there on May 5, 1999, at 10.5 years of age.

A male named Tilikum came to SeaWorld in January 1992. It was not long before Katina was pregnant again. She gave birth to her first son on September 9, 1993; the calf was named Taku. He was transferred to SeaWorld San Antonio in November 2006, where he died 11 months later from the West Nile virus.

Just seven months prior to Taku's birth, Katina's older daughter, Kalina, gave birth to her first calf, Keet, on February 2, 1993, thus making Katina a grandmother. Keet was born at SeaWorld San Antonio, where Kalina resided at the time.

Katina's next calf, a female named Unna, was born on December 27, 1996. In December 2002, Unna was sent to SeaWorld San Antonio, where she died in December 2015.

Katina's fifth calf, Ikaika, was a male born on August 25, 2002. Ikaika was separated from his mother at age 4, when he was sent to Marineland Canada on a breeding loan in November 2006. He was eventually transferred to SeaWorld San Diego in November 2011. Taku, Unna, and Ikaika were all fathered by Tilikum.

Taku impregnated his mother when he reached sexual maturity. The resulting calf, a female named Nalani, was born on September 18, 2006. According to an internal SeaWorld document, both Taku and Ikaika regularly displaced Nalani after they were introduced to her and Katina herself began displacing her and focusing her attention on her sons. Katina's usual maternal behavior only resumed after Taku and Ikaika were moved out of SeaWorld Orlando in November 2006.

On October 9, 2010, Katina gave birth to her seventh and final calf, and her third son, Makaio, just five days after her first offspring Kalina died. He was sired by Tilikum, who had already fathered three of her previous children. As of December 2010, Makaio was 7 feet long and weighed approximately 550 pounds.

Besides Keet, Katina's daughter Kalina had three other calves: Keto (male; born 1995 died 2024), Tuar (male; born 1999), and Skyla (female; born 2004 died 2021). Katina's son Taku fathered a male calf named Trua who was born to Takara on November 23, 2005. Keet, Kalina's oldest calf, has fathered two daughters of his own: Kalia (2004) and Halyn (2005–2008), making Katina the first ever great-grandmother at SeaWorld. Keto, Kalina's second son, had a son, Adán, in 2010, and a daughter, Victoria (2012-2013). On December 2, 2014, Kalia gave birth to Katina's first great-great grandchild, Amaya, sired by Ulises. Amaya died in August 2021.

== In recent times ==
At the time of her death, Katina was about 50 years old and was the second oldest orca in captivity after Corky, who lives at SeaWorld San Diego. Measuring 17 feet and weighing in at about 5,200 pounds, Katina was small compared to most other females but she was rather bulky. She was considered an excellent performer and very reliable. Jeffrey Ventre, a former SeaWorld trainer, called her "the Cadillac of killer whales". Katina was one of SeaWorld Orlando's main performers and was used daily. She was generally relaxed, sweet-natured and patient and had never been involved in any major known incidents with one of her trainers, although SeaWorld has reported that on five occasions between 1989 and 1995, she mouthed, bumped or pushed a trainer.

Being SeaWorld Orlando's matriarch, Katina had been the dominant orca at the park since 1987. Sometimes, although rarely, she could be stubborn and refuse to perform. When this happened, usually all of the other orcas followed suit. In 2006, a female named Kayla arrived in Orlando from SeaWorld San Antonio. She and Katina spent a lot of time together until Kayla's death in January 2019.

In March 2018, Katina sustained a major injury to her dorsal fin. SeaWorld stated that she had been interacting with several orcas and that Trua had been near her at the moment of the injury, but that it did not know which whale was responsible for it. Her dorsal fin was treated with medical honey and cold laser therapy and it had since fully healed, although a notch remained visible at its base.

Until her death, Katina lived with her two youngest offspring, Nalani and Makaio, her grandson Trua, and an unrelated female, Malia, born in 2007.

On December 21, 2025, SeaWorld Orlando announced that Katina had died on December 20, aged around 50, after her health had started to progressively decline over the previous several weeks.

== See also ==
- List of individual cetaceans
