= Tilikum (orca) =

Captive male orca (1981–2017)

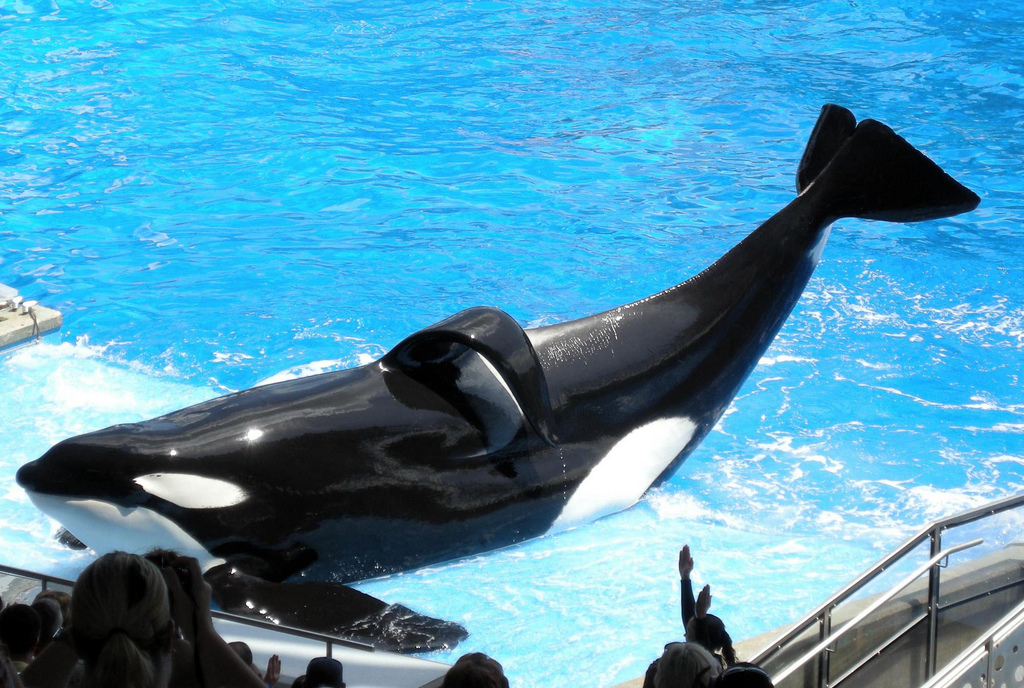
- Tilikum during a 2009 performance at SeaWorld Orlando
- Species: Orca (Orcinus orca)
- Breed: Icelandic
- Sex: Male
- Born: c. December 1981
- Died: January 6, 2017 (aged 35); Orlando, Florida, US
- Years active: 1983–2016
- Known for: Involvement in the deaths of three people and SeaWorld performances.
- Mates: Haida II; Nootka IV; Katina; Gudrun; Kalina; Taima; Takara
- Offspring: Kyuquot (son) 1991–present; Calf (son) 1992–1992; Taku (son) 1993–2007; Nyar (daughter) 1993–1996; Unna (daughter) 1996–2015; Sumar (son) 1998–2010; Tuar (son) 1999–present; Tekoa (son) 2000–present; Nakai (son) 2001–2022; Kohana (daughter) 2002–2022; Ikaika (son) 2002–present; Skyla (daughter) 2004–2021; Malia (daughter) 2007–present; Sakari (daughter) 2010–present; Makaio (son) 2010–present; (7 alive as of 2026)
- Weight: 12,500 lb (5,700 kg)

Tilikum (c. December 1981 – January 6, 2017), nicknamed Tilly, was a captive male orca who spent most of his life at SeaWorld Orlando in Florida. He was captured in Iceland in 1983; about a year later, he was transferred to Sealand of the Pacific near Victoria, British Columbia, Canada. He was subsequently transferred in 1992 to SeaWorld in Orlando, Florida, where he sired 21 calves.

Tilikum was heavily featured in CNN Films' 2013 documentary Blackfish, which claims that orcas in captivity suffer psychological damage and become unnaturally aggressive. Of the four fatal attacks by orcas in captivity, Tilikum was involved in three: Keltie Byrne, a trainer at the now-defunct Sealand of the Pacific; Daniel P. Dukes, a man trespassing in SeaWorld Orlando; and SeaWorld Orlando trainer Dawn Brancheau.

== Description ==
Tilikum was the largest orca in captivity. He measured 22.5 feet (6.9 m) in length and weighed about 12,500 pounds (5,700 kg). His pectoral fins were 7 feet (2.1 m) long, his fluke curled under, and his 6.5-foot-tall (2.0 m) dorsal fin was collapsed completely to his left side.

His name, in the Chinook Jargon of the Pacific Northwest, means "friends, relations, tribe, nation, common people".

== Life ==
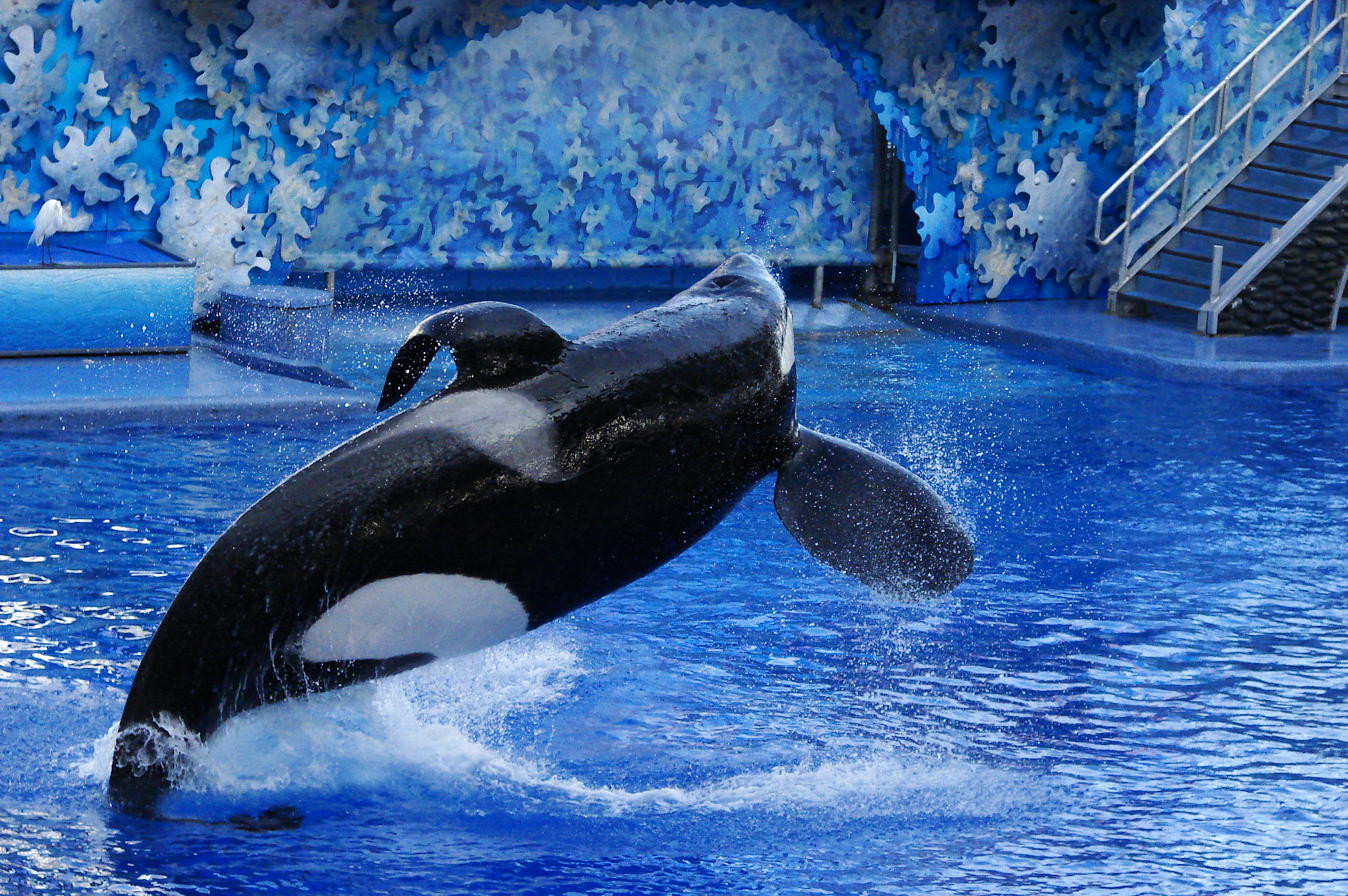
Tilikum at SeaWorld Orlando in 2009

=== Origin ===
Tilikum was captured when he was two years old, along with two other young orcas, by a purse-seine net in November 1983, at Berufjörður in eastern Iceland. After almost a year in a tank at the Hafnarfjördur Marine Zoo, he was transferred to Sealand of the Pacific in Oak Bay, a suburb of the city of Victoria on Vancouver Island, Canada. At Sealand of the Pacific, he lived with two older female orcas named Haida II and Nootka IV. As both orcas were pregnant, Haida II and Nootka IV behaved aggressively towards Tilikum, including forcing him into a smaller medical pool where trainers kept him for protection.

=== Fatalities ===
While orca attacks on humans in the wild are rare, with no fatal attacks having been recorded, four humans have died due to interactions with captive orcas. Tilikum was involved in three of those deaths.

==== First death ====
Keltie Lee Byrne (December 6, 1970 – February 20, 1991) was a 20-year-old Canadian student, animal trainer, and competitive swimmer. She had been working with orcas Tilikum, Nootka IV, and Haida II at Sealand of the Pacific. On February 20, 1991, Byrne was working a shift when she slipped and fell into the whale pool. Witnesses recalled that Byrne screamed and panicked after realizing that one of the whales was holding her foot and dragging her underwater.

According to the coroner's report, rescue attempts were thwarted by the whales, who refused to let Byrne go even after she was believed to have fallen unconscious in the water. Her body was later retrieved with a large net, after which she was determined to be deceased. Her death was ruled an accident.

Shortly after the accident, Sealand of the Pacific management decided to sell all of its orcas to SeaWorld and, eventually, to close the park entirely. On January 3, 1992, SeaWorld applied to the National Marine Fisheries Service for a temporary emergency permit to bring Tilikum to the United States due to concerns for his health. He had been the subject of systematic aggression from Nootka IV and Haida II after the latter gave birth to a calf, Kyuquot, on December 24, 1991, and was confined to a small medical pool that was only slightly larger than he was. The application was approved on January 8, 1992, and Tilikum was immediately moved to SeaWorld Orlando.

Byrne's death received renewed attention after the 2010 death of SeaWorld trainer Dawn Brancheau and the 2013 documentary Blackfish, which discusses Tilikum's involvement in Byrne's death, as well as in the deaths of Daniel P. Dukes and Brancheau. The latter two deaths occurred after Tilikum had been sold by Sealand of the Pacific to SeaWorld.

Steve Huxter, head of animal training at Sealand of the Pacific at the time, said, "They never had a plaything in the pool that was so interactive. They just got incredibly excited and stimulated." No motive of the three whales was established; the case was over twenty years old when it resurfaced in relation to the death of Brancheau.

==== Second death ====
Daniel P. Dukes was a 27-year-old man from South Carolina. SeaWorld claimed that Dukes was a vagrant who climbed into Tilikum's pool and drowned, while the coroner's report, along with animal rights advocates for Tilikum, have pointed out that Dukes' corpse was severely mutilated by the whale. Dukes was regarded by the media as a trespasser and nuisance rather than a direct victim of Tilikum. This perception is challenged in the documentary Blackfish.

Little has been published regarding the early life of Dukes. A drifter with a love of nature and environmentalism, he was known for acts of petty theft and general vagrancy. At some point on the night of July 6, 1999, Dukes, who had hidden inside SeaWorld Orlando after it closed, went to the whale pool where Tilikum was held. The following morning, his body was discovered by staff, draped over Tilikum's backside as the whale swam around. As SeaWorld has no security tape footage of the pool on that night, it is unclear exactly what transpired. Orange County Sheriff's Office (OCSO) reported that a 911 call was received from SeaWorld Orlando at 7:25 a.m.. Detective Calhoun arrived at the park eight minutes later. Dukes' corpse was retrieved and identified.

Two months after their son's death, Dukes' parents filed a lawsuit against SeaWorld which was later dropped.

Dukes' death became a frequent example in arguments over the welfare of marine mammals in captivity. Former marine mammal trainer Ric O'Barry argued that Dukes was probably not near Tilikum's tank with any form of malicious intent, but instead that the nature-loving man was "fascinated" by the whale and wanted to visit it. He argued, "I think the whale probably pulled [Dukes] down, held him underwater. I don't think they know how often we breathe. The problem is that the whales have nothing better to do," O'Barry said. "They're bored. We literally bore them to death. It's like you living in the bathroom for your life."

==== Third death ====
On February 24, 2010, Tilikum killed 40-year-old veteran SeaWorld trainer Dawn Brancheau following a "Dine with Shamu" show. She was rubbing Tilikum in a post-show routine when the orca grabbed her and pulled her into the water. SeaWorld stated that Tilikum had grabbed Brancheau by her ponytail, although some witnesses reported that he grabbed her by the left arm or shoulder. He scalped her, then bit off her arm. Brancheau's autopsy indicated death by drowning and blunt force trauma. Brancheau's death prompted a legal case over the safety of working with orcas and the ethics of keeping marine mammals in captivity.

=== Return to performing ===
Tilikum returned to performing on March 30, 2011. High-pressure water hoses were used to massage him, rather than hands, and removable guardrails were used on the platforms, as OSHA restricted close contact between orcas and trainers, and reinforced workplace safety precautions after Brancheau's death. He was paired with his grandson Trua and was often seen performing alongside him during the finale of the new One Ocean show. He had on occasion been kept with his daughter Malia, or both Trua and Malia at the same time. In December 2011, he was put on hiatus from the shows following an undisclosed illness, and resumed performing in April 2012.

== Declining health and death ==
SeaWorld Orlando announced in March 2016 that Tilikum's health was deteriorating, and it was thought he had a lung infection due to bacterial pneumonia. In May 2016, it was reported Tilikum's health was improving. On January 6, 2017, SeaWorld announced that Tilikum had died early in the morning. The cause of death was reported as a bacterial infection.

== Offspring ==
Tilikum sired 21 offspring in captivity, seven of which are alive as of 2026.

While at Sealand of the Pacific, Tilikum sired his first calf when he was about eight or nine years old. His first son, Kyuquot, was born to Haida II on December 24, 1991. Kyuquot and his mother were transferred to SeaWorld San Antonio in January 1993, a year after Tilikum was moved to Seaworld Orlando. Kyuquot has remained at the San Antonio park ever since.

Following his arrival at SeaWorld Orlando, Tilikum sired many calves with many different females. His first calf born in Orlando was to Katina. Katina gave birth to Taku on September 9, 1993. Taku died on October 17, 2007.

Among Tilikum's other offspring are: Nyar (1993–1996), Unna (1996–2015), Sumar (1998–2010), Tuar (1999–present), Tekoa (2000–present), Nakai (2001–2022), Kohana (2002–2022), Ikaika (2002–present), Skyla (2004–2021), Malia (2007–present), Sakari (2010–present) and Makaio (2010–present).

In 1999, Tilikum began training for artificial insemination. In early 2000, Kasatka, who resided at SeaWorld San Diego, was artificially inseminated using his sperm. She gave birth to Tilikum's son, Nakai, on September 1, 2001. On May 3, 2002, another female in San Diego, named Takara, bore Tilikum's calf through artificial insemination. Tilikum was also the first successful, surviving grandfather orca in captivity with the births of Trua (2005–present), Nalani (2006–present), Adán (2010–present) and Victoria (2012–2013).

== Controversy ==
On December 7, 2010, TMZ reported that SeaWorld's president, Terry Prather, received a letter from PETA and Mötley Crüe member Tommy Lee referencing SeaWorld's announcement regarding limiting human contact with Tilikum. In the letter, Lee referred to Tilikum as SeaWorld's "chief sperm bank" and asserts that the relevant process constitutes continued human contact. The letter implored SeaWorld to release Tilikum from his tank, stating, "I hope it doesn't take another tragic death for SeaWorld to realize it shouldn't frustrate these smart animals by keeping them [confined] in tanks". On December 8, 2010, the SeaWorld Vice President of Communications responded to Lee's letter via E! News, stating that PETA's facts were not only inaccurate, but that SeaWorld trainers also "do not now, nor have they ever entered the water with Tilikum for this purpose".

Tilikum and the captivity of orcas is the main subject of the documentary film Blackfish, which premiered at the Sundance Film Festival in January 2013 and caused a drop in SeaWorld attendance and revenue. The film and a subsequent online petition led to several popular musical groups cancelling performances at SeaWorld and Busch Gardens Tampa Bay's "Bands, Brew & BBQ" event in 2014, as both parks are owned by the same company.

== In popular culture ==
Books

Books about Tilikum include:

- Kirby, David (2012). Death at SeaWorld: Shamu and the Dark Side of Killer Whales in Captivity. New York: St. Martin's Press. ISBN 978-1250002020.
- Zimmerman, Tim (2014). Killer in the Pool. New Word City. ISBN 978-1-61230-163-1.

Podcasts

- On May 21, 2023, the true crime podcast Swindled covered Tilikum in Episode 95: The Captive.
- On September 6 and 13, 2024 the true crime podcast The Last Podcast On The Left covered Tilikum in Episode 588 - Horrors Of SeaWorld I - The Perfect Killer and Episode 589 - Horrors of SeaWorld II - Free Tilly.

== See also ==
- Blackfish
- Tilikum v. Sea World
- Incidents at SeaWorld parks
- List of individual cetaceans
