= Ramu III =

Captive male orca (c. 1966 – 1986)

- Other names: Ramu, Winston
- Species: Orca (Orcinus orca)
- Sex: Male
- Born: c. 1966
- Died: 28 April 1986 (aged 19–20); SeaWorld San Diego, California, United States
- Years active: 1970–1986
- Mates: Katina; Kenau; Kandu V
- Offspring: Kalina (daughter); Baby Shamu II (daughter)
- Weight: 3,402 kg (7,500 lb)
- Height: 20 ft 6 in (6.25 m)
- Named after: Male orca named Ramu (1964–1982)

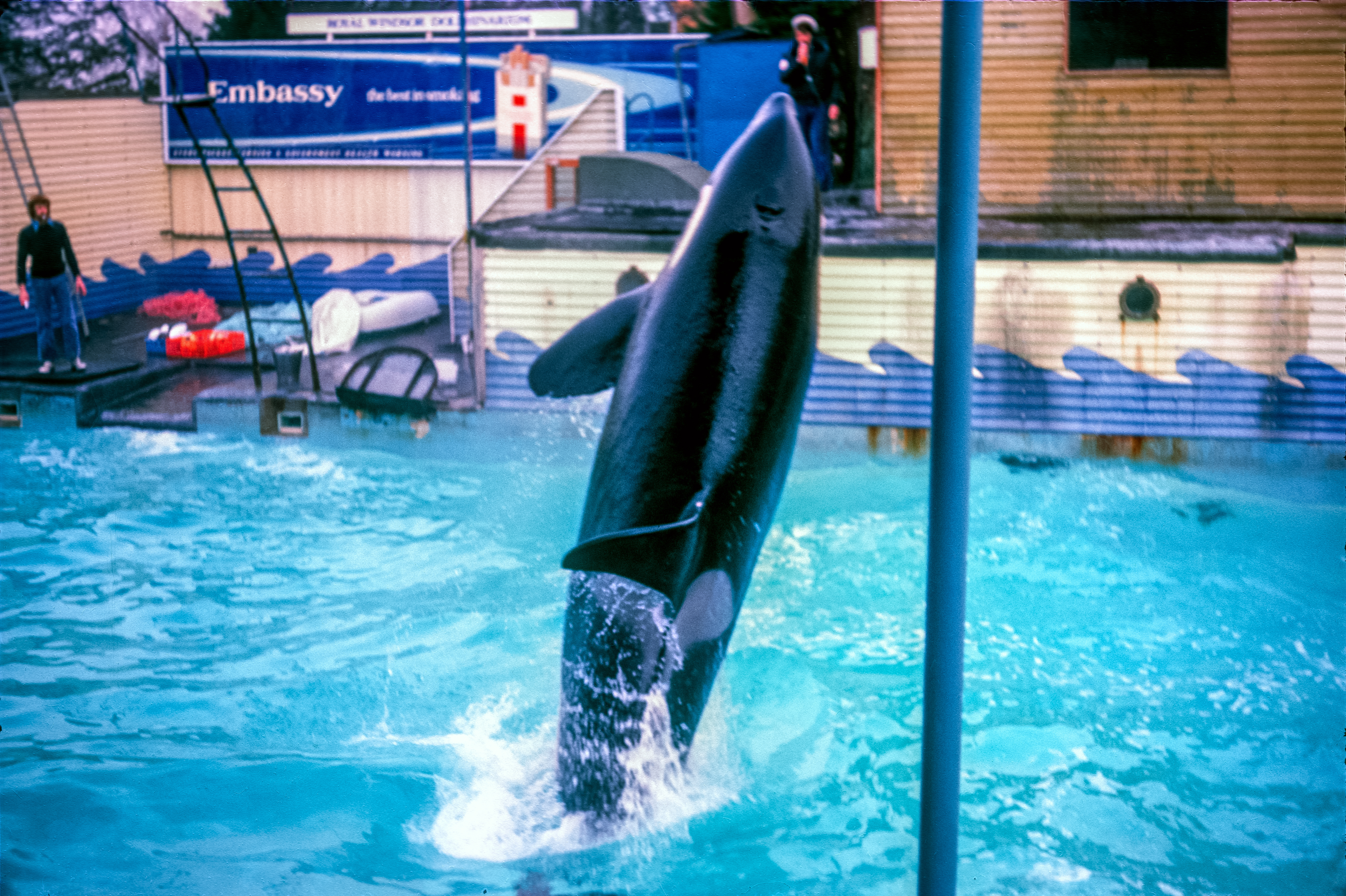
Orca a male named Ramu in dolphinarium Windsor Safari Park, December 1975

Ramu III (known as "Ramu," and later renamed "Winston") (c. 1966 – 28 April 1986) was an Orca ("killer whale") who resided at the now-defunct Windsor Safari Park in Berkshire, England between 1970 and 1976, and later, at SeaWorld San Diego in California between 1976 and 1986. At capture, Ramu was 13.32 ft (4.06 m) long and a member of the Southern Resident Killer Whales' L-pod. It is assumed his family members still survive in the Salish Sea and in nearby Pacific coastal waters.

== Windsor Safari Park ==
Ramu was then transferred to Windsor Safari Park, where he became the star attraction in the park's Sea World exhibition, (not to be confused with the American SeaWorld, where he would later move) splashing people with the beating of his tail against the water, along with a small number of dolphins, with whom Ramu cohabited. Over the next six years, Ramu matured into a bull Orca and began to outgrow the relatively small tank at the safari park. In October 1976, Ramu was sold to SeaWorld San Diego in a swap that saw two female Orcas (named Winnie and Hoi Wai) move in the other direction. To avoid confusion with another Orca named Ramu that already lived at Seaworld San Diego, Ramu was renamed Winston, although he inevitably performed under the stage name Shamu, (used for most performing whales at SeaWorld, after the first whale kept there.)

== SeaWorld San Diego ==
As a fully grown male, Winston dwarfed even his pool mates, his size distinguishing him almost as much as his dorsal fin, which flopped over to his left hand side and made him instantly recognizable to visitors to the park. He courted and mated with several females at the park, impregnating Kandu V, Kenau and Katina. Katina was the first to give birth, on September 26, 1985, to a healthy young female Orca named Kalina (the first of the 'Baby Shamu' generation of whale calves).

In January 1986, both Kenau and Kandu V lost their babies, Kenau's dying of a heart defect 11 days after birth and Kandu's being stillborn.

Kalina was the first calf conceived and born in captivity successfully, and the success ushered in a generation of numerous Orca births in captivity around the world. Kalina's mother Katina is still alive at SeaWorld Orlando in Florida, along with Kalina's own calves, Keet, (the first 'grandbaby' Shamu), Keto, Tuar and Skyla, as well as a stillbirth in 1997. In 2004, Keet had his first offspring, a female called Kalia, the first great grandbaby Shamu, making Winston a great-grandfather. In 2005, Keet sired Halyn, his second offspring thus making Winston a great-grandfather again. In 2014 when Kalia gave birth to her first calf Amaya, Winston became a great-great-grandfather. Kalina died on October 4, 2010, from sepsis, at 25 years old.

Winston's necropsy report dates his death to April 28, 1986, due to chronic cardiovascular failure. At the time of his last health checkup, Winston had been 7.4 metres long and weighed 5,443 kg. He was approximately 23 years old at the time of his death.

== Family members/breed ==
- Daughters: Kalina*, Baby Shamu II*, and 1986 stillborn calf with Kandu V*
- Granddaughters: Skyla*
- Grandsons: Keet, Keto*, and Tuar
- Great-Granddaughters: Kalia and Halyn*
- Great-great-Granddaughter: Amaya*
- Possible relatives: Lil Nooka*, Jumbo*, Chappy*, Clovis*, and Ramu IV*
- Breed: 100% Southern Resident

(Asterisk indicates a deceased relative)

== See also ==
- Shamu (SeaWorld show)
- SeaWorld
- Keiko, star of the Free Willy trilogy of films.
- Windsor Safari Park
- Captive orcas
- List of captive orcas
- List of individual cetaceans
