= Death of Alexis Martínez =

2009 killing of an orca trainer in Spain

Alexis Martínez
- Born: 27 February 1980
- Died: 24 December 2009 (aged 29); Loro Parque, Tenerife, Spain

Alexis Martínez (27 February 1980 – 24 December 2009) was a Spanish animal trainer, notable as the victim of a fatal attack by an orca. He was killed by a SeaWorld-owned orca, Keto, held at Loro Parque's Orca Ocean in the Canary Islands.

== Background ==
Loro Parque (Spanish for "parrot park") is a zoo located on the outskirts of Puerto de la Cruz in Tenerife. The park has the world's largest indoor penguin exhibition and the longest shark tunnel in Europe and is one of only two parks in Europe to house orcas.

In 2004 and 2005, before the first four orcas were brought to Loro Parque, eight animal trainers from the park were sent to SeaWorld parks in Texas and Florida for training. Four SeaWorld orcas were delivered by wide-body cargo plane in February 2006, and various SeaWorld staff occasionally traveled to Loro Parque. Regular contact was maintained at several levels, such as remote monitoring capability via Orca Ocean's video surveillance system. By December 2009, SeaWorld had leased four orcas to Loro Parque.

Alexis Martinez, age 29, had worked at Loro Parque since 2004. He was killed during a Christmas show rehearsal when he was attacked by one of the orcas, Keto. Keto pulled Alexis under water and then rammed him in his chest. He died of massive internal bleeding and injuries.

== Death ==
The park initially characterized the death as an "accident" and claimed that the body showed no signs of violence, but the subsequent autopsy report stated that Martinez died due to grave injuries sustained by an orca attack, including multiple compression fractures, tears to vital organs, and the bite marks of the animal on his body.

According to an Occupational Safety and Health Review Commission Decision and Order in 2012, Keto was not responding to the operant conditioning signals given:

On December 24, 2009, exactly two months before Tilikum killed Dawn Brancheau, Loro Parque trainer [Alexis Martínez] was working with Keto, a killer whale owned by SeaWorld Parks & Entertainment. During a training session, Keto pulled [Martínez] under water and then rammed him in his chest. [Martínez] died of massive internal bleeding (Tr. 408). A SeaWorld employee described the event in an incident report. After Keto failed to perform a number of behaviors correctly, [Martínez] and Keto were floating on the surface of the pool:

Keto came up with [Martínez] and appeared calm but did appear to position himself between [Martínez] and the stage. [Martínez] waited for calmness from Keto and asked for a stage call (underwater tone). Keto responded and was received at stage by Brian. ... Brian instructed [Martínez] to swim out (toward the slideover). When [Martínez] commenced swimming (sculling) Keto began leaning toward him. Brian attempted another hand target but Keto left control and engaged [Martínez] by pushing him to the bottom with his rostrum. Brian observed the intensity of the situation and decided to initiate a hand slap. Keto did not respond. Brian tapped the bucket, then hand slapped again. It appeared Keto responded, came to the surface for a breath. The alarm was sounded. Keto immediately after taking a breath returned to [Martínez] and then resurfaced near the stage with Alexis on his rostrum and his mouth closed. (Exh. C-6, p. 2725).

Keto released [Martínez], who sank to the bottom of the pool. Mr. Rokeach and the Loro Parque trainers were eventually able to get Keto to enter another pool, where Keto could be isolated while [Martínez]'s body was recovered. While the gate was closing Keto began to play with it, keeping it open. After trainers released a net into the pool, Keto allowed the gate to close. Mr. Rokeach entered the stage pool and retrieved [Martínez]'s body from the bottom.

SeaWorld Parks & Entertainment temporarily suspended waterwork in all of its parks immediately following [Martínez]'s death, then resumed waterwork shortly afterwards. Loro Parque ceased (apparently permanently) all waterwork with killer whales (Tr. 563-564).

During the local investigation into the death of Alexis Martinez it came to light that the park had mischaracterized a 2007 incident with Tekoa, another male orca, to the public by claiming it was an accident rather than an attack.

== Safety ==
The Canary Islands Ministry of Labour and Immigration asserts that water work with orcas is an "inherently risky activity", the main risk being "precisely in the interaction with an animal that weighs more than three thousand kilos and is also in its natural environment (water)". It asserts that the only preventive action is a simple one: "prohibition of the activity."

== See also ==
- Death of Dawn Brancheau
