= Kasatka =

Captive female orca (c.1976–2017)

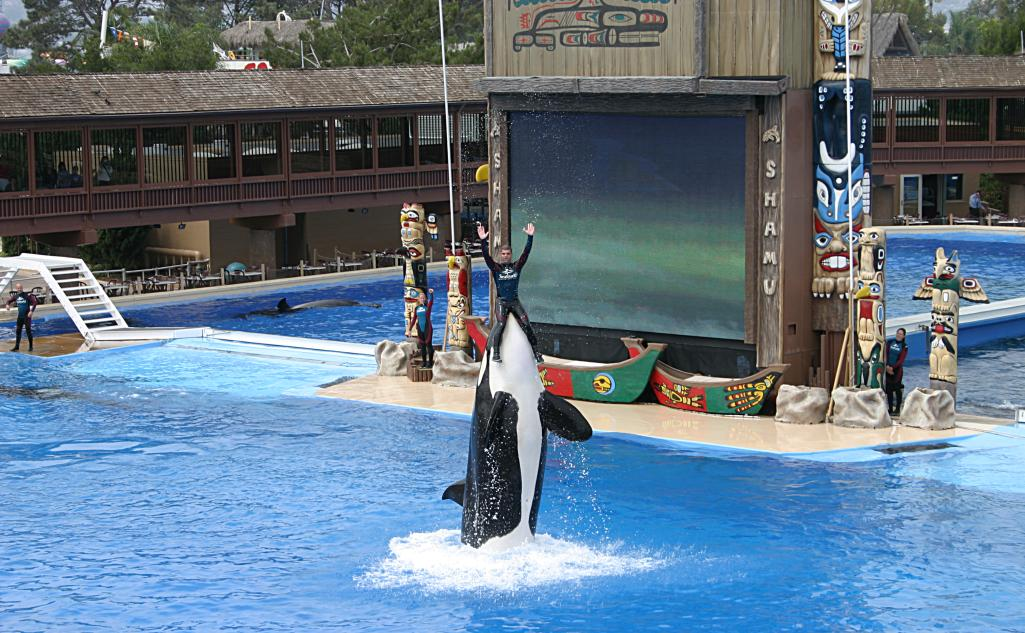
- Kasatka as "Shamu" at SeaWorld San Diego lifting a trainer out of the water.
- Species: Orca
- Sex: Female
- Born: c. 1976
- Died: 15 August 2017 (aged 40–41)
- Years active: 1978–2017
- Known for: Performer of the Shamu show.
- Mates: Kotar; Keet
- Offspring: Takara (daughter); Nakai (son); Kalia (daughter); Makani (son)

Kasatka (c. 1976 – 15 August 2017) was a female orca who was captured from the wild in 1978, and kept at SeaWorld San Diego.

== Life ==
Kasatka was captured off the southeastern coast of Iceland on 26 October 1978, with another young female whale named Kahana. Both were estimated to be around 2 years old. The two whales were housed in a sea pen in Grindavík before being shipped to SeaWorld later that year.

Kasatka showed occasional aggression to humans. In 1993 and 1999, she tried to bite trainer Ken Peters during a show. On November 30, 2006, she grabbed Peters again and dragged him underwater twice during their show. Peters survived with minor injuries.

After suffering incurable pneumonia from 2008 to 2017, Kasatka was euthanized at age 40 on August 15, 2017.

== Offspring ==
Kasatka was the matriarch of the San Diego Orca SeaWorld family. She was the first captive cetacean to successively receive artificial insemination, according to John Hargrove, a trainer there.

She bore two daughters and two sons, resulting in six grandchildren and two great-grandchildren by the time of her death:

- Takara (born 1991), female (SeaWorld San Antonio)
  - Kohana (born May 3, 2002 – September 14, 2022), female (Loro Parque)
    - Adán (born October 13, 2010), male (Loro Parque)
    - Victoria ("Vicky") (August 3, 2012 – June 16, 2013), female (Loro Parque)
  - Trua (November 23, 2005), male (SeaWorld Orlando)
  - Sakari (January 7, 2010), female (SeaWorld San Antonio)
  - Kamea (December 6, 2013 - June 19, 2025), female (SeaWorld San Antonio)
  - Kyara (April 19, 2017 – July 24, 2017), female (SeaWorld San Antonio)
- Nakai (born September 1, 2001 – August 5, 2022), male (Seaworld San Diego); first orca conceived by artificial insemination
- Kalia (born December 21, 2004), female (SeaWorld San Diego)
  - Amaya (born December 2, 2014 – August 19, 2021), female (SeaWorld San Diego)
- Makani (born February 14, 2013), male (SeaWorld San Diego)

== See also ==
- List of individual cetaceans
- List of captive orcas
- Captive killer whales
- Killer whale attacks on humans
- Keiko, the star of the 1993 movie Free Willy
