= List of captive orcas =

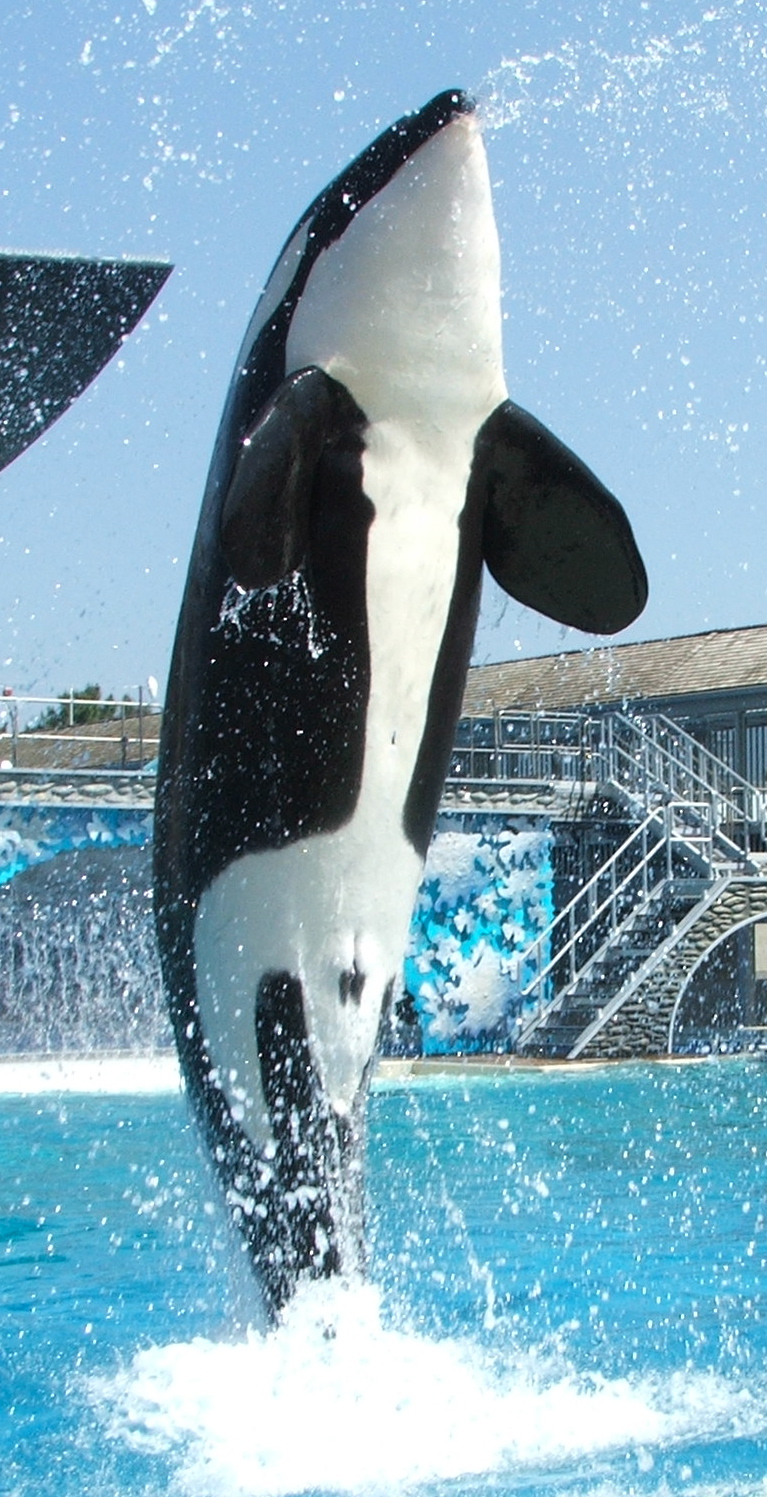
Orca show at SeaWorld San Diego

Orcas, or killer whales, are large predatory cetaceans that were first captured live and displayed in exhibitions in the 1960s. They soon became popular attractions at public aquariums and aquatic theme parks due to their intelligence, trainability, striking appearance, playfulness in captivity and sheer size. As of April 2026, there are an estimated 53 - 55 orcas residing at facilities in North and South America, Europe and Asia.

The first North Eastern Pacific orca, Wanda, was captured in November 1961 by a collecting crew from Marineland of the Pacific, and over the next 15 years, around 60 to 70 orcas were taken from Pacific waters for this purpose. When the US Marine Mammal Protection Act of 1972 effectively stopped the capture of Pacific orcas, captures were made in Icelandic waters. Since 2010, captures have been made in Russian waters. However, facilities in the United States such as the SeaWorld chain of aquariums have not collected wild orcas in over 35 years.

As of 2 April 2026, captive orcas are distributed globally as follows:

Category	Western World	Japan	China & Russia	Total
Total	22	6	27	56
Captured/Rescued	3	1	18	22
Captive-born	21	5	9	33

Out of the 22 captive orcas currently located in the western world (United States, Spain and France), 19 were born in captivity (Adán, Ikaika, Kalia, Keet, Keijo, Kyuquot, Malia, Makaio, Makani, Nalani, Orkid, Sakari, Shouka, Takara, Tekoa, Teno, Trua, Tuar, Wikie). Only 3 (Corky II - Northern Resident; Morgan - Norwegian; Ulises - Icelandic) are wild-captured or rescued individuals still held in these countries. Lolita (Tokitae), the last surviving Southern Resident orca in captivity, died in 2023.

In Japan, 5 of the 6 orcas on display were born in captivity (Lara, Lovey, Luna, Lynn, Ran II). The only wild-captured survivor is Stella.

All 25 known captive orcas in China and Russia are Russian ecotypes. Of these, 18 were wild-captured: Naja/Naya (the last captive orca in Russia) and 17 individuals in China (Bandhu, Chad, Cookie, Dora, Jade, Kaixin (Kaishin), Katenka, "Kyra" (real name unknown), Nakhod, Nukka/Grace/Yaohe, Pànghǔ (Fat Tiger), "Samara" (real name unknown), Sean (Shawn II), Sonya, Tyson, WCKWOWR-OO-C1601, WCKWOWR-OO-C1601).[citation needed] Additionally, there are 9 orcas in China that were born in captivity: (Bowen (博文), Cody (胖豆丁), Cookie's Calf, Jingxi (惊喜), Katniss (三隆)), Loki (二笼)), Pearl (隆珠), Yīlóng (一隆), Zimo (子墨)).

Kalina, born in September 1985, was the first captive-born orca calf to survive more than a few days. In September 2001, Kasatka gave birth to Nakai, the first orca conceived through artificial insemination, at SeaWorld San Diego. This technique lets park owners maintain a more healthy genetic mix in the small groups of orcas at each park, while avoiding the stress of moving orcas for breeding purposes.

== List of living captive orcas ==
This table contains a full list of living captive orcas in human care (status 7 June 2026).

Name	Sex	Population	Current location	Current country	Origin	Birth / Capture Date	Age
Adán	Male	87.5% Icelandic – 12.5% Southern residents	Loro Parque	Spain	Captive born	13 October 2010	16
Bandhu	Male	100% Russian Transient	Chimelong Spaceship	China	Captured	2013–2014	15–16
Chad	Male	100% Russian Transient	Chimelong Spaceship	China	Captured	2013–2014	15–16
Bowen (Wǔlong)	Male	100% Russian Transient	Chimelong Spaceship	China	Captive born	1 December 2023	2
Cody (Fat Beans)	Male	100% Russian Transient	Shanghai Haichang Ocean Park	China	Captive born	10 September 2021	5
Cookie	Female	100% Russian Transient	Shanghai Haichang Ocean Park	China	Captured	c. 2012 - birth / July 2015? - capture	13–14
Cookie's Calf	Male	100% Russian Transient	Shanghai Haichang Ocean Park	China	Captive Born	17 June 2026	0
Corky II	Female	100% Northern Residents	SeaWorld San Diego	United States	Captured	c. 1965 - birth / 12 December 1969 - capture	60–61
Dora	Female	100% Russian Transient	Shanghai Haichang Ocean Park	China	Captured	c. 2012 - birth / summer 2015 - capture	13–14
Ikaika	Male	100% Icelandic	SeaWorld San Diego	United States	Captive born	25 August 2002	24
Jade	Female	100% Russian Transient	Chimelong Spaceship	China	Captured	2013–2015; betw. August 2013 and July 2014; may have been captured on 13 August 2013	?
Jingxi	Male	100% Russian Transient	Chimelong Spaceship	China	Captive born	6 October 2023	3
Kalia	Female	87.5% Icelandic – 12.5% Southern Residents	SeaWorld San Diego	United States	Captive born	21 December 2004	21
Kaixin (Kaishin)	Male	100% Russian Transient	Chimelong Spaceship	China	Captured	2013–2015; fall of 2013 or summer of 2014	14–15
Katenka	Female	100% Russian Transient	Chimelong Spaceship	China	Captured	c. 2006 - birth / July 2015 - capture	19–20
Katniss (Sanlong (三隆))	Female	100% Russian Transient	Chimelong Spaceship	China	Captive born	27 January 2022	4
Keet	Male	75% Icelandic – 25% Southern Residents	SeaWorld San Diego	United States	Captive born	2 February 1993	33
Keijo	Male	100% Icelandic	Marineland of Antibes	France	Captive born	20 November 2013	13
"Kyra" (real name unknown)	Female	100% Russian Transient	SunAsia Beluga Whale World (holding)	China	Captured	2016?	?
Kyuquot	Male	100% Icelandic	SeaWorld San Antonio	United States	Captive born	December 1991	34
Lara	Female	100% Icelandic	Kamogawa Sea World	Japan	Captive born	8 February 2001	25
Loki (Erlong (二笼))	Male	100% Russian Transient	Chimelong Spaceship	China	Captive born	17 April 2021	5
Lovey	Female	100% Icelandic	Kamogawa Sea World	Japan	Captive born	11 January 1998	28
Luna	Female	100% Icelandic	Kamogawa Sea World	Japan	Captive born	19 July 2012	14
Lynn	Female	100% Icelandic	Port of Nagoya Aquarium	Japan	Captive born	13 November 2012	14
Malia	Female	25% Bigg's Transient – 75% Icelandic	SeaWorld Orlando	United States	Captive born	12 March 2007	19
Makaio	Male	100% Icelandic	SeaWorld Orlando	United States	Captive born	9 October 2010	16
Makani	Male	50% Argentinian – 50% Icelandic	SeaWorld San Diego	United States	Captive born	14 February 2013	13
Morgan	Female	100% Norwegian	Loro Parque	Spain	Captured (officially rescued)	c. 2007	18–19
Naja/Naya (Juliet/Malishka)	Female	100% Russian	Moskvarium	Russia	Captured	c. 2010	15–16
Nakhod	Male	100% Russian Transient	Chimelong Spaceship	China	Captured	betw. August 2013 and July 2014 - Capture 2005 - Birth	20–21
Nalani	Female	100% Icelandic	SeaWorld Orlando	United States	Captive born	18 September 2006	20
Nukka/Grace/Yaohe	Female	100% Russian Transient	Chimelong Spaceship	China	Captured	13 August 2013	15–16
Orkid	Female	50% Icelandic – 50% Northern Resident	SeaWorld San Diego	United States	Captive born	23 September 1988	38
Pànghǔ (Fat Tiger)	Male	100% Russian Transient	Shanghai Haichang Ocean Park	China	Captured	c. 2008 – c. 2014 (unconfirmed)	17–18
Pearl (Longzhu)	Female	100% Russian Transient	Chimelong Spaceship	China	Captive Born	15 February 2026	0
Ran II	Female	100% Icelandic	Kobe Suma Sea World	Japan	Captive born	25 February 2006	20
"Samara" (real name unknown)	Female	100% Russian Transient	SunAsia Beluga Whale World (holding)	China	Captured	2016?	?
Sakari	Female	100% Icelandic	SeaWorld San Antonio	United States	Captive born	7 January 2010	16
Sean (Shawn II)	Male	100% Russian Transient	Shanghai Haichang Ocean Park	China	Captured	c. 2010 – July 2015	15–16
Shouka	Female	100% Icelandic	SeaWorld San Diego	United States	Captive born	25 February 1993	33
Sonya	Female	100% Russian Transient	Chimelong Spaceship	China	Captured	July 2015	13–14
Stella	Female	100% Icelandic	Kobe Suma Sea World	Japan	Captured	c. January 1987 – c. October 1987	39
Takara	Female	100% Icelandic	SeaWorld San Antonio	United States	Captive born	9 July 1991	35
Tekoa	Male	75% Icelandic – 25% Bigg's Transient	Loro Parque	Spain	Captive born	8 November 2000	26
Teno	Male	Mother 100% Norwegian, father unknown	Loro Parque	Spain	Captive born	31 March 2025	1
Trua	Male	100% Icelandic	SeaWorld Orlando	United States	Captive born	23 November 2005	20
Tuar	Male	75% Icelandic – 25% Southern Resident	SeaWorld San Antonio	United States	Captive born	22 June 1999	27
Tyson	Male	100% Russian Transient	Chimelong Spaceship	China	Captured	betw. August 2013 and July 2014 - Capture 2005 - Birth	20–21
Ulises	Male	100% Icelandic	SeaWorld San Diego	United States	Captured	c. 1977	48–49
WCKWOWR-OO-C1601	Male	100% Russian Transient	Wuxi Changqiao Killer Whale Ocean World Resort	China	Captured	c. 2013 - birth is a guess, since there are no sources yet; August 2016 - Capture	12–13
WCKWOWR-OO-C1601	Male	100% Russian Transient	Wuxi Changqiao Killer Whale Ocean World Resort	China	Captured	c. 2013 - birth is a guess, since there are no sources yet; August 2016 - Capture	12–13
Wikie	Female	100% Icelandic	Marineland of Antibes	France	Captive born	1 June 2001	25
Yīlóng (一隆)	Male	100% Russian Transient	Chimelong Spaceship	China	Captive born	5 April 2019	7
Zimo	Male	100% Russian Transient	Shanghai Haichang Ocean Park	China	Captive born	5 December 2023	2

== List of unknown captive orca status ==
Name	Sex	Breed	Origin:	Birth / Capture Date	Date when missing/last known encounter	Location of disappearance	Age if alive	Possible location
Malvina	Female	100% Russian Transient	Captured	July 2012 (est.)	July 2015 – Possible escape in 2016	TINRO	14	Dalian Laohutan Ocean Park – Linyi Polar Ocean World

== List of deceased captive orcas ==
Name	Sex	Population	Origin: Captured, Rescued, Captive-Born	Birth / Capture Date	Birth / Capture Location	Date of death	Age at death	Cause of death	Location of death	Country of Death
Ahab	Male	100% Southern Resident	Captured	1960 (est.) – Birth 1968, 15 Oct – Capture	Bainbridge Island, WA	1972, 27 Sep	12	systemic nocardiosis	U.S. Navy (Hawaii)	United States
Ai	Female	100% Icelandic	Captured	1988 (est.) – Birth 1989, Oct – Capture	Hornafjörður, Iceland	1995, 28 Aug	7	Candidiasis	Nanki Shirahama Adventure World	Japan
Amaya	Female	93.75% Icelandic – 6.25% Southern Resident	Captive born	2014, 2 Dec	SeaWorld San Diego	2021, 19 Aug	6	Gastrointestinal disease	SeaWorld San Diego	United States
Argentinian Capture	Unknown	100% Argentinian Transient	Captured	Unknown – birth 1992, 17 Nov – Capture	Samborombon Bay, Argentina	1992, 17 Nov	Unknown	Stranding complications	Samborombon Bay Argentina; Transport Truck; Mundo Marino	Argentina
Baby Shamu ll	Female	50% Icelandic – 50% Southern Resident	Captive born	1986, 5 Jan	SeaWorld San Diego	1986, 16 Jan	0 (11 Days)	Heart Defect; Respiratory Virus	SeaWorld San Diego	United States
Belen (Bethlehem)	Female	100% Argentinian	Captured	Unknown Birth/Age 1988, 6 Jan – Capture	Samborom Bay, Argentina	2000, 4 Feb	12+	Suspected Kidney Infection	Mundo Marino	Argentina
Benkei	Male	100% Japanese	Captured	1971 (est.) – Birth 1979, 26 Feb – Capture	Taiji, Japan	1989, Feb	16	Acute Pneumonia	Nanki Shirahama Adventure World	Japan
Benkei 2 (Ushiwaka)	Male	100% Icelandic	Captured	1979 (est.) – Birth 1980, 24 Oct – Capture	Alvidra, Iceland	1983, 2 Jul	3	Malignant Lymphoma	Nanki Shirahama Adventure World	Japan
Benkei 3	Male	100% Japanese	Captured	1981 (est.) – Birth 1982, 12 Feb – Capture	Taiji, Japan	1983, Dec	2	Unknown	Private Residence	Japan
Bingo (Thor)	Male	100% Icelandic	Captured	1984, Nov – Capture	Reydarfjordur, Iceland	2014, 2 Aug	32	Pneumonia	Port of Nagoya Public Aquarium	Japan
Chimo (Moby Dick)	Female	100% Bigg's Transient	Captured	1970, 1 Mar – Capture	Pedder Bay, Victoria, BC	1972	4	Complications of Chédiak–Higashi syndrome, which also caused her albinism	Sealand of the Pacific	Canada
Cookie's calf	Unknown	100% Russian Transient	Captive born	2023, Jul	Shanghai Haichang Ocean Park	2023, Jul	16	Stillbirth	Shanghai Haichang Ocean Park	China
Earth	Male	100% Icelandic	Captive born	2008, 13 Oct	Kamogawa Sea World	2025, 3 Aug	16	Gastric Torsion	Port of Nagoya Public Aquarium	Japan
Gudrun	Female	100% Icelandic	Captured	1975 late or 1976 early (est.) – Birth 1976, 28 Oct – Capture	Hrollaugseyjar, Iceland	1996, 25 Feb	20	Stillbirth complications	SeaWorld Orlando	United States
Haida	Male	100% Southern Resident	Captured	1968, 5 Oct – Capture	Yukon Harbor, Washington	1982, 3 Oct	18	Lung Infection	Sealand of the Pacific	Canada
Haida II	Female	100% Icelandic	Captured	1982, Oct	Stokkseyri, Iceland	2001, 1 Aug	2	Brain Abscess; Cerebral Necrosis; Fungal Infection	SeaWorld San Antonio	United States
Hugo	Male	100% Southern Resident	Captured	1968, 22 Feb	Washington, US	1980, 4 Mar	Unknown	Brain aneurysm	Miami Seaquarium	United States
Inouk	Male	100% Icelandic	Captive born	1999, 23 Feb	Marineland Antibes	2024, 28 Mar	25	Subacute Fibrinous Enteritis Peritonitis	Marineland Antibes	France
Kalina (Baby Shamu)	Female	50% Icelandic – 50% Southern Resident	Captive born	1985, 26 Sep	SeaWorld Orlando	2010, 4 Oct	25	Bacteremia septicemia	SeaWorld Orlando	United States
Kamea	Female	50% Argentinian Transient - 50% Icelandic	Captive born	2013, 6 Dec	SeaWorld San Antonio	2025, 19 Jun	11	Unspecified Lung Disease	SeaWorld San Antonio	United States
Kandu	Female	100% Southern Resident	Captured	1966 (est.) – Birth 1967, 15 Feb – Capture	Yukon Harbor, Washington, US	1971, 3 Feb	5	Pneumonia; liver necrosis	SeaWorld San Diego	United States
Kandu 2	Female	100% Southern Resident	Captured	1968 (est.) – Born 1971, Aug – Capture	Washington, US	1979, Oct	11	Pneumonia	Marineland of Canada	Canada
Kandu V	Female	100% Icelandic	Captured	1977, 12 Oct - Capture	Ingolfshöfdi, Iceland	1989, 21 Aug	15	Fatally injured herself when she attacked Corky II	SeaWorld San Diego	United States
Kasatka	Female	100% Icelandic	Captured	1976, Dec (est.) – Birth 1978, 26 Oct – Capture	Tvisker, Iceland	2017, 15 Aug	41	Respiratory disease	SeaWorld San Diego	United States
Katina	Female	100% Icelandic	Captured	1978, 17 October	Skaftárós, Iceland	2025, 20 December	~50	Euthanasia, Chronic bacterial infection	SeaWorld Orlando	United States
Kayla	Female	50% Icelandic – 50% Northern Resident	Captive born	1988, 26 Nov	SeaWorld San Antonio	2019, 28 Jan	30	Lung disease	SeaWorld Orlando	United States
Keiko (Siggi Bent Fin)	Male	100% Icelandic	Captured	1977 (est.), Nov – Birth 1979, 5 Nov – Capture 2002, 15 Jul – Release	Meðallandsbugt, Iceland	2003, 12 Dec	26	Acute pneumonia	Taknes Bay, Skålvikfjorden, Norway	Norway
Keto	Male	75% Icelandic – 25% Southern Resident	Captive born	17 June 1995	SeaWorld Orlando	22 November 2024	29	Bacterial pneumonia and septic/endotoxic shock	Loro Parque	Spain
Kirill (Cyril)	Male	100% Russian	Captured	2017 (est.) – Birth 2018, Aug – Capture	Near Srednyaya Bay, Russia	2019, Feb	1	Deterioration in health	Center for Adaptation Of Marine Mammals	Russia
Kiska	Female	100% Icelandic	Captured	1977 (est.) – Birth 1979, Nov – Capture	Ingólfshöfði, Iceland	2023, 9 Mar	47	Bacterial Infection	Marineland of Canada	Canada
Kiva	Female	100% Northern Resident	Captive born	1982, 16 Jun	Marineland of the Pacific	1982, 3 Aug	0 (48 days)	Respiratory failure	Marineland of the Pacific	United States
Kohana	Female	100% Icelandic	Captive born	2002, 2 May	SeaWorld San Diego	2022, 14 Sep	20	Cardiac Malformation	Loro Parque	Spain
Kotar	Male	100% Icelandic	Captured	1977–78 – Birth 1978, 9 Oct – Capture	Iceland	1985, 1 April	17-18	Fractured skull and blood loss from playing with gate	SeaWorld San Antonio	United States
Kshamenk	Male	100% Argentinian Transient	Rescued (or forced stranding)	1988 - Birth (est.) 1992, 19 November - Rescue	Samborombon Bay, Argentina	2025, 14 December	~37	Cardiorespiratory arrest	Mundo Marino, Argentina	Argentina
Kyara	Female	100% Icelandic	Captive born	2017, 17 Apr	SeaWorld San Antonio	2017, 24 Jul	0 (98 days)	Infection (possibly pneumonia)	SeaWorld San Antonio	United States
Lolita (Tokitae)	Female	100% Southern Resident	Captured	1964–1967	Penn Cove, Puget Sound	2023, 18 Aug	56–59	Likely kidney disease	Miami Seaquarium	United States
Maggie's calf KSW-OO-B9501	Male	100% Icelandic	Captive Born	1995, 3 Mar - Birth	Kamogawa Sea World	1995, 3 Mar	1/2 hour	Unknown	Kamogawa Sea World	Japan
Miracle	Female	100% Southern Resident	Rescued	1977, 9 Aug – Rescued	Vancouver, BC	1982, 12 Jan	5+	Drowned	Sealand of the Pacific	Canada
Moana	Male	100% Icelandic	Captive born	2011 Mar 16	Marineland Antibes	2023 Oct 18	12	Acute Bacterial Septicemia	Marineland Antibes	France
Moby Doll II (Hound Dog)	Male	100% Southern Resident	Captured	1959 (est.) – Birth 1964, 16 Jul – Capture	Saturna Island, BC	1964, 9 Oct	5	Multiple infections; malnutrition	Vancouver Aquarium	Canada
Naja's Calf	Female	100% Russian Transient	Captive born	2023, 29 Dec	Moskvarium	2024, 26 Jan	0 (29 Days)	Cardiac Malformation	Moskvarium	Russia
Nakai	Male	100% Icelandic	Captive born	2001, 1 Sep	SeaWorld San Diego	2022, 4 Aug	20	Infection	SeaWorld San Diego	United States
Namu	Male	100% Northern Resident	Captured	? – Birth, 1965, 23 Jun – Capture	Namu, BC	1966, 9 Jul	17	Entagled in sea pen and drowned; infection	Seattle Marine Aquarium	United States
Narnia	Female	100% Russian Transient	Captured	2012, 11 Aug	Moskvarium	2023, 3 Jan	17	Acute intestinal volvulus	Moskvarium	Russia
Nootka I (Knootka)	Female	100% Bigg's Transient	Captured	1970, 1 Mar – Capture	Pedder Bay, Victoria, BC	1990, 13 Mar	24	Pneumonia	SeaWorld San Diego	United States
Nootka II	Female	100% Southern Resident	Captured	1973, 3 Aug – Capture	Pedder Bay, Victoria, BC	1974, 1 May	20-30	Ruptured Aorta	Sealand of the Pacific	Canada
Nootka III	Female	100% Bigg's Transient	Captured	1975, 16 Aug - Capture	Pedder Bay, Victoria, BC	1976, 15 May	3	Peritonitis; Perforated Ulcer	Sealand of the Pacific	Canada
Nootka IV	Female	100% Icelandic	Captured	1980, (est.) - Birth; 1982, Oct - Capture	Héradsflói, Iceland	1994, 9 Sep	15	Stillbirth Complications; Pneumonia; Septicemia	SeaWorld Orlando	United States
Nootka IV's calf	Male	100% Icelandic	Captive born	1992, 4 Feb	Sealand of the Pacific	1992, 10 Mar	0 (36 days)	Infection	Sealand of the Pacific	Canada
Nord	Male	100% Russian Transient	Captured	2013, 13 Aug	Moskvarium	2023, Jun	16	Acute peptic ulcer	Moskvarium	Russia
Nyar	Female	100% Icelandic	Captive born	1993, 31 Dec – Birth	SeaWorld Orlando	2007, 10 Jun	13	Immune system failure	SeaWorld Orlando	United States
Oscar (Wolfie)	Male	100% Icelandic	Captured	1986 (est.) – Birth 1987, Oct – Capture	Seyðisfjörður, Iceland	2012, 20 Dec	27	Undisclosed Illness	Kamogawa Sea World	Japan
Pascuala	Female	100% Eastern Tropical Pacific (ETP)	Rescued	2007, Feb (est.) – Born 2007, 10 Apr – Capture	Bay of Mantanchen, Mexico	2007, 10 Jun	0 (90+ days)	Immune system failure; malnutrition; infection	Vallarta Dolphin Adventures	Mexico
Patty (Freyja)	Female	100% Icelandic	Captured	1982 (est.) – Birth 1984, Nov – Capture	Reyðarfjörður, Iceland	1987, 6 Sep	5	Acute enteritis	Kamogawa Sea World	Japan
Sacchi	Female	100% Japanese	Captured	Unknown Birth; 1982, Feb – Capture	Taiji, Japan	1984, Apr	11+	Pneumonia	Enoshima Aquarium, Fujisawa City	Japan
Sacchi's Calf (no name)	Male	100% Japanese	Captive born	1982, May	Enoshima Aquarium, Fujisawa City	1982, May	0 (10 Days)	Brain abscess	Enoshima Aquarium, Fujisawa City	Japan
Shamu	Female	100% Southern Resident	Captured	1961 (est.) - Birth 1965, Oct - Capture	Washington, US	1971, 16 Aug	10	Septicemia	SeaWorld San Diego	United States
Skyla	Female	75% Icelandic – 25% Southern Resident	Captive born	2004, 9 Feb	SeaWorld Orlando	2021, 11 Mar	17	Intestinal torsion	Loro Parque	Spain
Taima	Female	50% Icelandic – 50% Bigg's Transient	Captive born	1989, 11 Jul	SeaWorld Orlando	2010, 6 Jun	20	Placenta previa	SeaWorld Orlando	United States
Taku	Male	100% Icelandic	Captive born	1993, 9 Sep	SeaWorld Orlando	2007, 17 Oct	14	Pneumonia	SeaWorld San Antonio	United States
Tilikum	Male	100% Icelandic	Captured	1981 (est.) Birth 1983, 9 Nov – Captured	Berufjörður, Iceland	2017, 6 Jan	35	Bacterial pneumonia	SeaWorld Orlando	United States
Tula	Male	100% Northern Resident	Captured	1968, 18 Jul	Queen Charlotte Strait, near Malcolm Island	1968, 23 Oct	3 (est.)	Brain hemorrhage; ruptured blood vessel; fungal kidney infection	Dolfinarium Harderwijk	Netherlands
Ula	Female	50% Norwegian – 37.5% Icelandic – 12.5% Southern Resident	Captive born	2018, 22 Sep	Loro Parque	2021, 11 Aug	2	Twisted intestine	Loro Parque	Spain
Unna	Female	100% Icelandic	Captive born	1996, 27 Dec	SeaWorld Orlando	2015, 21 Dec	18	Systemic Bacterial Infection	SeaWorld San Antonio	United States
Victoria (Vicky)	Female	87.5% Icelandic – 12.5 Southern Resident	Captive born	2012, 3 Aug	Loro Parque	2013, 16 Jun	0 (316 days)	Intestinal issues	Loro Parque	Spain
Wanda, "The Newport Specimen"	Female	North Pacific Offshore	Captured	1961, 18 Nov	Newport Harbor, California	1961, 20 Nov	Mature	Brain trauma; pneumonia; gastroenteritis secondary to nematode infestation	Marineland of the Pacific	United States
Winston (Ramu)	Male	100% Southern Resident	Captured	1970, 8 Aug - Capture	Penn Cove, Washington	1986, 28 Apr	19	Chronic cardiovascular failure	SeaWorld San Diego	United States
Yaka	Female	100% Northern Resident	Captured	1968, Dec - Birth 1969, 11 Dec - Capture	Pender Harbour, BC	1997, 29 Oct	29	Respiratory Infection	Marine World Africa / Six Flags Discovery Kingdom, California	United States

*Please note that not all orcas that died in the capture operations are listed.

== Notable captive orcas ==
=== Living ===
==== Adán ====
Adán (Spanish variation of "Adam") measured about 6.6 feet (2.0 m) and weighed 330 pounds at birth. He was born on 13 October 2010, at Loro Parque to Kohana and Keto. Due to the fact that Kotar is Kohana's maternal grandfather and Keto's father, Adán is 6.25% inbred. His mother, 8-year-old Kohana, showed no maternal interest in him at birth. As a result, he was bottle-fed by staff until May 2011 when he was permanently moved onto fish. Adán's only full-blooded sibling, Victoria, died in 2013.

When Morgan was moved to Loro Parque, Adán was the first killer whale to be introduced to her.

==== Corky II ====
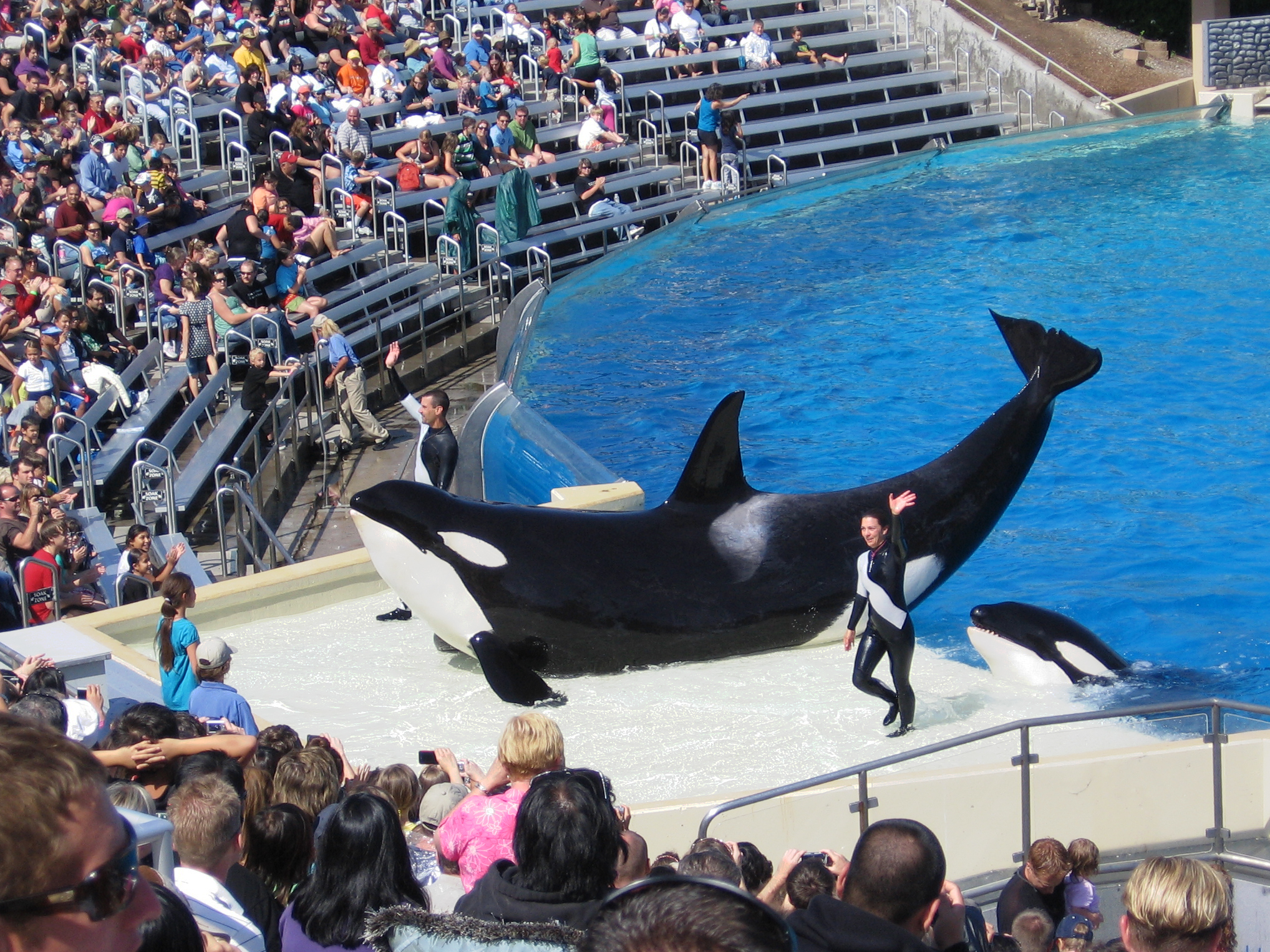
Corky performing at SeaWorld, San Diego, California

Corky II, more commonly known as Corky, is a 60-year-old female orca at SeaWorld San Diego. She is the longest-held captive orca in the world, the largest female orca in captivity at 20 feet long and 8,500 pounds, and the oldest orca to ever be displayed to the public. She is now the only survivor from the Northern Resident captures. Around the age of four, Corky was captured in Pender Harbour off the coast of British Columbia on 11 December 1969. From there, she went to Marineland of the Pacific and lived with three other orcas. However, the two orcas who she was captured with died after three years and she spent most of her time at Marineland with an orca bull named Orky. Corky has been pregnant seven times, resulting in four live births from 1977 to 1985 (with two failures in 1986 and 1987), none of which survived the first two months of life.

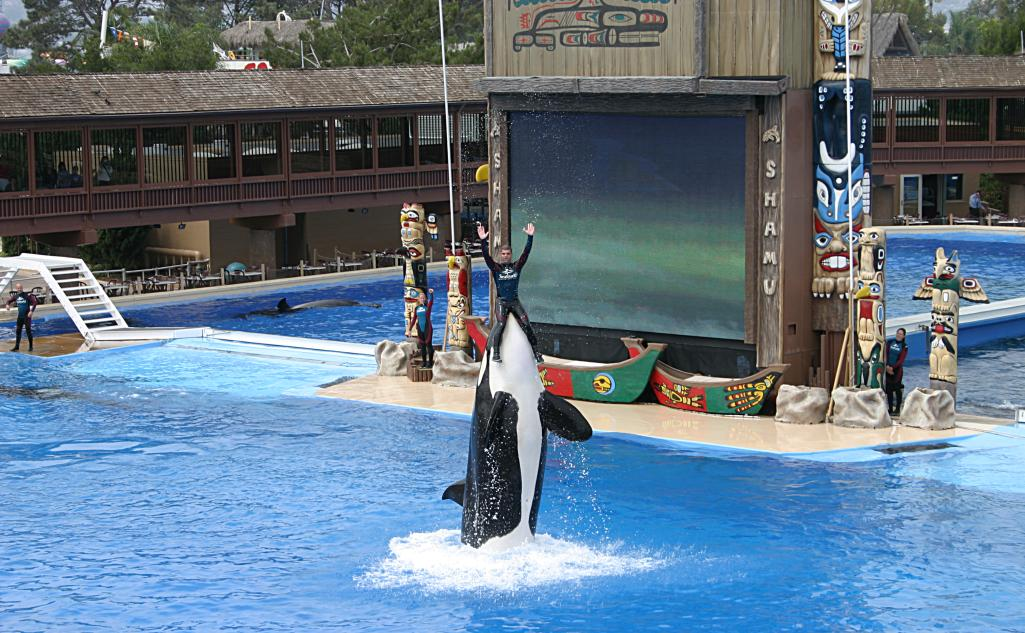
Corky 2 at SeaWorld San Diego lifting a trainer out of the water

On 21 January 1987, during her seventh pregnancy, she and Orky were moved to SeaWorld San Diego. She settled well in the new environment, but she had problems with one of the Icelandic orcas, Kandu V. The two females fought for dominance and it peaked during a show in 1989, resulting in Kandu V's death. Corky is also used as the "Welcome Whale" for new trainers and new orcas. She has also "adopted" some of the whales she has been with. She has been a surrogate mother to Sumar, Splash, Orkid, and Keet. Corky is easy to identify, mostly because of her large size for a female, her tall unbent dorsal fin, the small 'chips' in her dorsal fin, and a nick in her left dorsal fluke. She also has experienced problems in aggression from a male named Ulises. "At SeaWorld, Ulises is dominant over some of the female orcas, especially Corky. In fact, trainers would not allow Corky and Ulises to be in the same pool unless Kasatka, the then ultimate matriarch, was present to keep both whales calm." Since Kasatka's death in 2017, Corky and Ulises are no longer allowed to be in the same pool together.

==== Ikaika ====
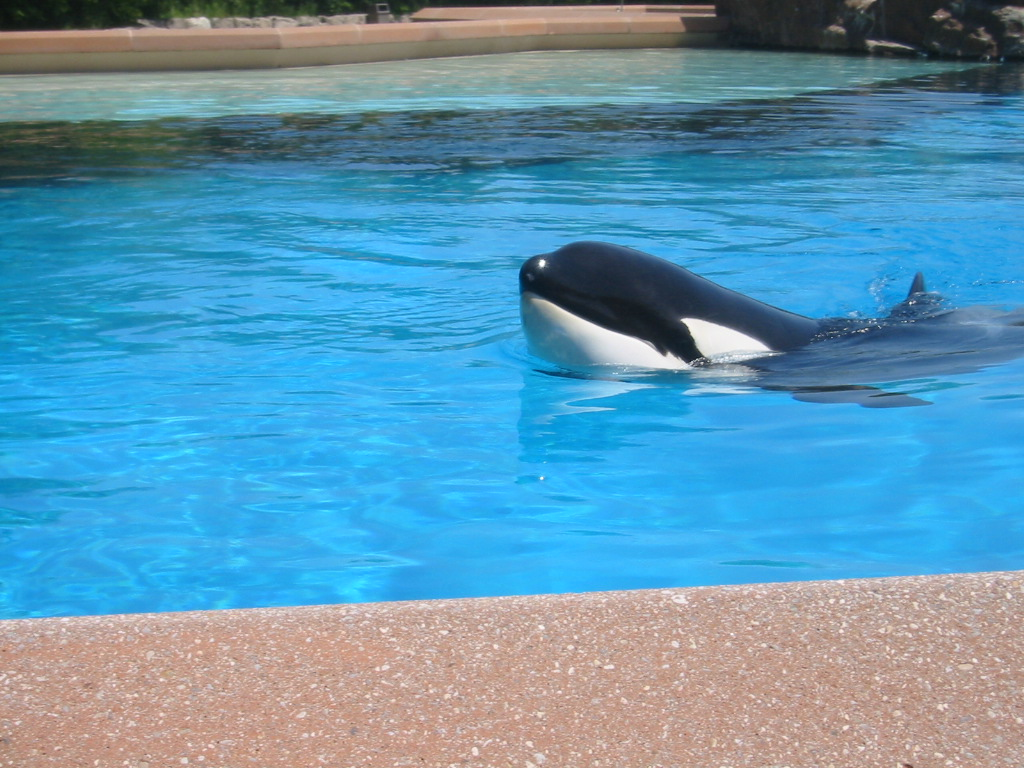
Ikaika swimming along in a tank at Marineland of Canada located in Niagara Falls, Ontario, Canada, on 11 June 2007

Ikaika (pronounced ee-KY-ka; Hawaiian for "strong") is a male orca born at SeaWorld Orlando in Orlando, Florida, on 25 August 2002. He is the offspring of Tilikum (father) and Katina (mother), making him Katina's fifth calf. To decide the name of the newborn whale a poll was taken. The following names were chosen to be on the poll: Ikaika (Hawaiian for "strong"), Mottaka (Icelandic for "reception"), Ramu (in honor of the late whale by that name), Tsunami (Japanese) and Ramius (after the Captain in The Hunt for Red October).

Ikaika was transferred to Marineland of Canada in Niagara Falls, Canada on a breeding loan on 18 November 2006, in exchange for three male beluga whales – Juno, Aurek, and Klondike – who joined Spooky within the Wild Arctic area of SeaWorld Orlando. Ikaika is a maturing male: his dorsal fin has collapsed, his flukes have fully made a curve, and he is about 21.9 feet (6.7 m) long and 9,900 pounds (4,500 kg). On 13 November 2011, Ikaika was transported to SeaWorld San Diego, where he joined six other orcas; Ulises, Corky II, Orkid, Kasatka, Nakai and Kalia. As of December 2021, Ikaika is SeaWorld San Diego's largest orca as well as the largest orca in the US weighing in at 9,900 pounds and 21.9 ft long. He spends most of his time with Corky II or Makani.

==== Kalia ====
Kalia was born at SeaWorld San Diego on 21 December 2004 at 9:22 a.m. in Shamu Stadium's main show pool following a little more than two hours of labor and was estimated to weigh between 300 pounds and 500 pounds and measure 6 to 7 feet. Her parents are Kasatka and Keet. She is also known as Great-Grandbaby Shamu. Her siblings are Takara (1991) Nakai (2001–2022), Halyn (2005–2008) and Makani (2013). The name Kalia is Hawaiian for "beauty". Kalia met her father for the first time when he returned to San Diego in February 2012. Kalia gave birth to Amaya on 2 December 2014, at 12:34 p.m. Amaya's father was Ulises, the form of conception is unknown, either naturally or through artificial insemination. Amaya died in 2021. Since her mother's passing in 2017, Kalia has taken over as the matriarch of the San Diego pod.

==== Keet ====
Keet is a bull orca who was born on 2 February 1993, in SeaWorld San Antonio. "Keet" is a Tlingit language word meaning "orca". His parents are Kalina and Kotar. As of January 2022, he measured approximately 20.6 feet (6.3 m) in length and weighed 8,900 pounds (4,000 kg). Keet is also known as Grandbaby Shamu because his mother is the first orca to be born and raised under human care successfully.

When he was 1 year and 8 months of age, his mother was moved to SeaWorld Orlando in Orlando, Florida to support her next pregnancy, Keet's brother Keto was born in 1995. Katerina, his aunt, was moved in from SeaWorld Ohio. In 1995, his father, Kotar, died. On 5 May 1999, Katerina died. Five months later, two females named Kayla and Winnie were moved in. In November 1999, he was moved to SeaWorld San Diego in California. There, he met his brother, Keto, and his playmate, Sumar. All three whales were moved to SeaWorld Ohio in February 2000. On 15 February 2001, Keet was returned to California; Sumar followed three days later, while Keto was relocated to SeaWorld San Antonio in Texas. Keet's best friends were the bull Ulises and a maturing male named Splash. On 24 April 2004, Keet was moved to his birthplace, meeting Kyuquot, Unna, Kayla, Keto, Tuar, and Tekoa.

Keet is a gentle and agile performer. On 21 December 2004, he became a father for the first time when Kalia, his daughter, was born at SeaWorld San Diego. On 9 October 2005, his mate Kayla gave birth to his second daughter Halyn, at SeaWorld San Antonio. He may have fathered Unna's stillborn in April 2006 and Kayla's miscarriage in spring 2007. Keet may have fathered the possible two extra pregnancies of Unna claimed by Bridgette Pirtle. Keet was the lowest ranking adult orca in the dominance chain at SeaWorld Texas. He is very sweet and was often used as a "starter whale" for new trainers along with a younger male named Tuar. On 15 June 2008, SeaWorld announced Halyn died unexpectedly; a necropsy was performed and the test results have been announced.

Keet moved back to SeaWorld San Diego on 27 February 2012, and he has been reunited with three of his old friends Corky II, Ulises and Orkid. He met his first daughter Kalia who was 7 years old when he returned. Keet became a grandfather on 2 December 2014, when Kalia gave birth to Amaya.

==== Keijo ====
Keijo is a bull orca who was born in captivity at Marineland Antibes on 20 November 2013. Keijo weighs about 330 pounds (Jan 2014). His father is Wikie's half-brother Valentin.

==== Kyuquot ====
Kyuquot is an orca at the Seaworld San Antonio, Texas. His parents are Tilikum and Haida II, he was born on Christmas Eve in 1991, at Sealand Victoria, British Columbia, Canada.

Ky only lived here for a short amount of time. After an incident in which a trainer died he moved to a SeaWorld park. Kyuquot was very close to his mother, who died in 2001. Over time, Ky became very close to several females who came to Texas, but is now often grouped with his half-brother, Tuar.

He used to perform waterworks, though after several incidents, he was not allowed to anymore. Ky is a very large male and can still do many athletic behaviors such as front flips. He is the largest orca at San Antonio, weighing over 9,000 pounds and over 22 ft long. He is a reliable whale and is most often grouped with Tuar, though he likes spending time with Takara and can be seen with any of his pod mates. On 19 April 2017, Takara gave birth to Kyara, and after Kyara died at 3 months old, it was announced that DNA tests showed that Kyuquot was her father.

==== Lovey ====
Lovey (ラビー, Rabī) was born on 11 January 1998, at Kamogawa Sea World, to mother Stella and father Bingo (Thor). She was the first orca calf born successfully in Japan (there had been five calves born before her, but none lived for more than ten days). The only other orca at KSW at the time of her birth was Oscar, who would mate with her later on, once she was older.

Her first calf was a male born on 13 October 2008, named Earth. Earth measured about 11.5 feet and weighs in at around 1,543 pounds (2011), he died in 2025. Lovey's stage name is Oyako, Japanese for "parent and child". On 19 July 2012, Lovey gave birth to her second calf, a female named Luna. Luna measures about 7.8 feet and weighs in at around 620 pounds (November 2012). Her father is Oscar. On 16 March 2024, a show was cancelled after trainers noticed signs of labor from Lovey. Sadly, the calf did not survive.

After the birth of Luna, however, Lovey began displacing Earth when he would "play rough" with Luna. He was eventually separated into the back pools after increased aggression from Lovey. On 7 December 2015, Earth was transferred to the Port of Nagoya Aquarium. He switched places with Ran II, who was sent back to Kamogawa Sea World shortly after.

==== Lynn ====
Lynn is a female calf residing at the Port of Nagoya Public Aquarium in Japan. She currently measures 3.9 metres (13 ft) long and weighs 952.5 kilograms (2,100 lb). Lynn was born on 13 November 2012, to mother Stella and father Bingo. Unlike most orcas, Lynn was born head first, as was her older sister Ran II. A public naming contest was held from 20 March – 6 May 2013. The park received a total of 19,384 applicants and 5,062 individual names, and settled on Lynn. Initial western reports named her as Rin, the direct but inaccurate Hepburn romanization of her name in katakana. Later content provided by the aquarium confirmed the correct transcription as Lynn.

On 3 August 2025, Earth died after becoming ill a few days prior, leaving Lynn alone. A day after his death, she was paired with two bottlenose dolphins to act as companions. The Port of Nagoya Aquarium has confirmed plans to reunite Lynn with another orca, but it is unknown if she will end up being transferred to another facility.

==== Malia ====
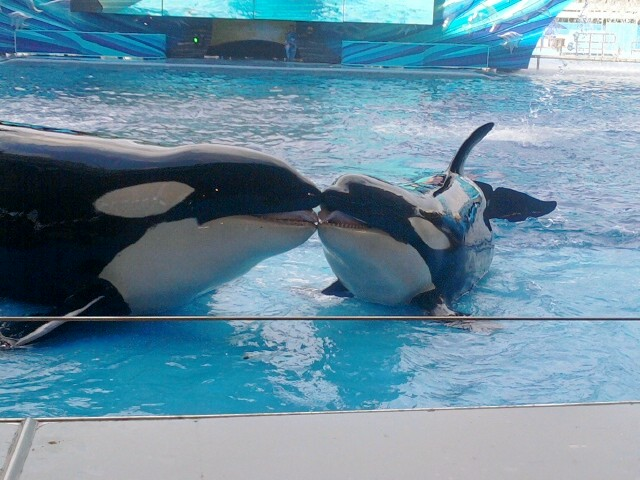
Kayla and Malia performing in One Ocean at SeaWorld Orlando in the side by side segment

Malia was born to Taima and Tilikum at SeaWorld Orlando on 12 March 2007. She was Taima's third calf and her name is Hawaiian for "calm and peaceful". She is learning new behaviors all the time and is used in shows daily alongside the other young orcas at SeaWorld Orlando. Malia's mother Taima died in June 2010 after a difficult labor that resulted in a stillborn male calf. Her eyepatches are long and skinny, and she has no marks, rakes, or chips in her tail fluke. Her teeth have bore holes where the pulp has been drilled to prevent bacterial infection as her teeth are worn down or broken by chewing on tank equipment. In January 2018, it was noted that Malia had begun to develop what appears to be a phototoxic reaction to unknown medications she is being given, but SeaWorld has not made any public statements regarding her condition. Photographs show her with a brownish lesion extending along her lower jaw, similar to the lesions that Kasatka displayed in the months before her death. This may be a worrying sign that Malia is being treated for a serious infection, and that the illness is being exacerbated by exposure to sunlight in her clear, shallow enclosure with little protection from the sun.

==== Malvina ====
Malvina is a 7-year-old female orca who arrived at TINRO in summer or fall 2015 from Russia. Not much is known about Malvina. Her location is unknown. She was believed to be captured in one of three captures in July 2015. "Newer" info also says that she had escaped or died in 2016. Nothing has been confirmed.

==== Makaio ====
Katina delivered her seventh calf on 9 October 2010, after a short 41-minute labor. The father is Tilikum. It was announced on 3 November 2010, that the calf was a healthy boy. The calf has interacted with all the members of the pod, and plays well with them. His name was decided by a poll with three names to vote for on SeaWorld Orlando's official Facebook page. The names were Nico, Greek for "Victory", Makaio, the Hawaiian form of the name Matthew, meaning "Gift of God", or Haruki, Japanese for "Shining Brightly". Makaio was the name chosen. He can be seen in SeaWorld's Orca Encounter show.

==== Makani ====
Kasatka's fourth calf is a male, born on Valentine's Day 2013 at 6:33 a.m. His name was chosen by a poll. The choices were "Hako", Norse for "chosen son", "Valentino", Italian for "strong", and "Makani", Hawaiian for "the wind". His name was announced on 14 June 2013. His siblings are Kalia, Nakai, and Takara. His father is Kshamenk at Mundo Marino. Makani can already swim upside down and wave his fluke. Makani can also do complex behaviors. Makani's father, Kshamenk, is an Argentinian transient orca (origin unknown) and his mother, Kasatka, is a resident Icelandic orca, making him a hybrid of the two vastly different ecotypes. Other such hybrids include the late Taima, her deceased sister Katerina, Taima's three calves and Kamea. Currently, Makani is 12 years old, measures at least 17.4 feet long and weighs 4,500 pounds which makes him massive compared to most other young males his age and is currently growing at a rapid pace.

==== Morgan ====
Morgan was rescued from the Wadden Sea on 23 June 2010. The estimated 1.5 year-old orca was alone, malnourished and underweight. She was transferred to Dolfinarium Harderwijk where she was taken care of for several months. After it became clear she could not be released into the wild, the Dolfinarium searched for another facility to take care of her, because their basins were too small. Morgan moved to Loro Parque on 29 November 2011 where she met five other killer whales Tekoa, Keto, Kohana, Skyla and Adán. Upon her arrival, Morgan was first introduced to Adán, a year-old male killer whale at the park, and to a young female killer whale named Skyla. Since her arrival, Morgan has gotten along very well with Adán and the two remain closely bonded to each other. Morgan was later introduced to the rest of the pod; Kohana, the matriarch of the Loro Parque pod, Keto and Tekoa.

In 2012, Loro Parque announced there was a good possibility that Morgan is partially deaf. In December 2017, Loro Parque announced Morgan was pregnant with her first calf. She gave birth to the calf, named Ula, on 22 September 2018. Ula died on 10 August 2021.

Kohana died due to infectious endocarditis associated with a heart defect, which was referred to in the necropsy as "cardiac malformation" on 14 September 2022.

On 11 February 2025, (three months after Keto had died) Loro Parque announced that Morgan was pregnant with her second calf and due to give birth soon. During her pregnancy, Morgan gained nearly 1,000 pounds (~450 kilograms) and became quite affectionate. It is unknown who the father is, as it could be Tekoa, Adán, or even Keto. The calf was born on 31 March 2025 at 5:26 a.m. The birth was reportedly very quick and, despite being a head-first birth, the calf appeared active. On 3 April, Loro Parque announced that Morgan's baby is a male. On 23 April, they announced that his name would be Teno.

==== Naja/Naya ====
Naja, also known as Naya, Juliet, and Malishka, is a Russian transient orca born in c. 2010. She was captured in 2014 and currently resides at the Moskvarium, an aquarium within the Exhibition of Achievements of National Economy. In 2019, footage of Juliet beaching during a performance at the Moskvarium whilst staff took no attempt to assist her went viral, leading to an outcry from activists for a ban on orca captivity and breeding. It was announced that Naja was pregnant with her first calf in 2023, which came after the deaths of both her pod mates, Narnia and Nord, earlier that year. On 29 December 2023, Naja gave birth to a daughter. But her daughter died on 26 January 2024 due to cardiac malfunction at 29 days old.

==== Nalani ====
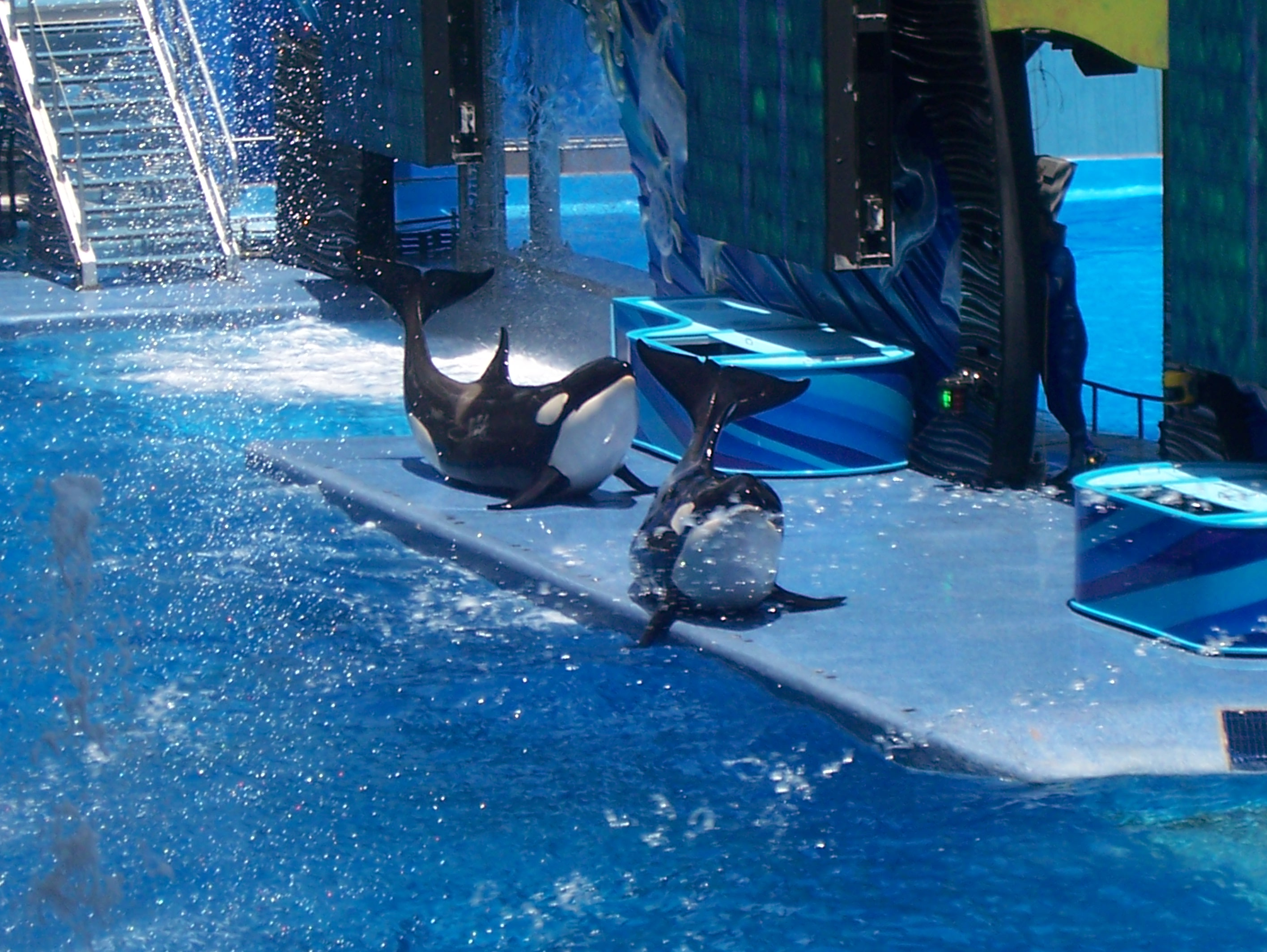
Nalani performing with Trua in the SeaWorld Orlando One Ocean show

Nalani is a female orca who currently resides at SeaWorld Orlando, where she was born on 18 September 2006. Her parents are Katina and Taku (who is, due to inbreeding, also her brother). She is Katina's sixth calf, and was Taku's second. She is a very loving and curious youngster, but was very dependent on her mother in the first few years. She is learning fast, as she is used in shows regularly alongside Trua, Malia and Katina.

==== Orkid ====
Orkid was born 23 September 1988, in SeaWorld San Diego, California. Orkid's parents are Kandu V (her mother), and Orky II (her father). She was the first orca born in the San Diego SeaWorld Park successfully. Orky II died only three days after Orkid was born. She was named Orkid, in memory of her father (most likely a combination of "Orky" and "kid"). In August 1989, Kandu V charged Corky II during a live show. The blow broke Kandu V's jaw, and severed an artery in Kandu V's head, apparently in an attempt to assert her dominance over Corky II. As a result, she began spouting blood with every breath she took. Forty-five minutes later Kandu V sank to the bottom of the pool and bled to death. Orkid witnessed this; for weeks after the incident, she would circle the tanks calling out and vocalizing. However, she was raised by Corky II, and later befriended a male named Splash. Orkid has been artificially inseminated many times, but has never gotten pregnant. Orkid is highly intelligent (having been affectionately nicknamed by trainers the "Rocket Scientist") and knows hundreds of behaviors. Only the most senior trainers are to work with her, as she has shown aggression toward trainers in the past. After an incident in 2006 where she dragged a trainer to the bottom of the show pool, Orkid has been barred from performing waterworks with trainers.

==== Sakari ====
Sakari was born on 7 January 2010, at SeaWorld San Antonio. Her mother is Takara and her father is Tilikum. Siblings on her mother's side include Kohana, Trua and Kamea. "Sakari" is an Inuit language word meaning "sweet".

==== Shouka ====
Born on 25 February 1993, in Antibes, France, to Sharkane and Kim II, the female orca's first nine years were spent with her parents and siblings. In 2002, she was moved to Six Flags Worlds of Adventure (former SeaWorld Ohio) in Aurora, Ohio, near Cleveland. After Worlds of Adventure was sold, in 2004 Shouka was moved to Six Flags Discovery Kingdom (Marine World Africa USA) in Vallejo, California. She was the only orca at the park but had bottlenose dolphin companions named Merlin and Cupid for 7 years until they were relocated due to compatibility concerns. In July 2012, Shouka began to display aggressive behavior during one of her performances. She lifted a trainer into the air and knocked her trainer back into an open door area that leads to the back of the stage. Even after the trainer was gone, Shouka leaped two more times onto the stage. Six Flags moved Shouka to SeaWorld San Diego the next month in August 2012, where Corky II immediately took her under her wing. She is currently fully integrated into the pod of eight orcas and is a highly athletic animal who enjoys working with her trainers. Shouka is known for her bottlenose dolphin vocalizations and for her unique upward-curving tail flukes, which she has had since birth.

==== Stella ====
Stella is Japan's oldest and most prolific captive killer whale, mother to Lovey, Lara, Sarah, Ran II, and Lynn. She was captured in Iceland in October 1987, under one year old, alongside Oscar, Maggie, and Bubba, and sent to Kamogawa Sea World in 1988. Initially housed in a small pool with resident male Bingo, the space limitations led to Bubba's transfer to Hong Kong in 1989. At that time the facility was building a new habitat for the orcas, but the pools would not be large enough to contain all five. Stella is among the few Icelandic captures to keep her original name.

Stella was trained for waterworks and performed them regularly. During the first few years, Maggie was the dominant whale in the pod. This caused tension between her and Stella, as Stella was larger and more competitive. However, aside from occasional conflicts, the two got along well. Stella took her place as the matriarch. On 3 March 1995, Maggie gave birth to the first captive-bred orca in Japan (Maggie's calf KSW-OO-B9501). Stella showed a lot of interest in the calf and was present for the birth. However, only half an hour later, the calf died from unknown causes. The death of the baby caused Maggie and Stella to become lethargic for the following days.

In 1996, both Stella and Maggie became pregnant. Fourteen months later, Maggie gave birth prematurely to a stillborn calf. After the birth, Maggie had complications from labor and died just two days later. Stella was deeply affected by her death and became easily aggressive toward her trainers. Because of this, all waterworks with Stella were stopped until the summer of 2000.

In 1998, Stella gave birth to the first successful killer whale calf in Japan. The calf, a female, was named Lovey. A few years later, Stella had her second daughter, Lara (2001). Shortly after Lara's birth, Stella became pregnant again and gave birth to her third daughter, Sarah (2003). Three years later, she had her fourth calf, Ran II (2006). However, two months after Ran II's birth, Sarah died from an unknown illness just before her third birthday. Stella officially became a grandmother in 2008 when Lovey gave birth to Earth.

In December 2010, Kamogawa announced they would be sending Stella and Bingo to the Port of Nagoya Public Aquarium as part of a breeding loan, where another female, Nami, was living at the time. However, Nami died in January 2011. After her death, it was found that both Lovey and Stella were pregnant. Since Kamogawa could not support two killer whale births at once, Ran II was added to the list of whales to be transferred, under the condition that Kamogawa supplied experienced trainers and covered the costs of transport.

On 14 December 2011, Stella, Bingo and Ran II were transferred to the Port of Nagoya Public Aquarium. Ran II was transported alone by truck and arrived there the same day. Stella and Bingo, however, were larger and had to be transported by ship. Their journey took two days but they eventually arrived on 16 December. Upon arrival at the aquarium, all three whales were initially kept in a smaller holding pool within the main pool complex. They were gradually introduced to the other pools until they felt comfortable enough to explore the entire complex. Stella continued her role as matriarch, and the three no longer participated in waterworks.

In 2012, Stella gave birth to her fifth and youngest daughter, Lynn. She was very attentive to her, and they shared a close bond. In August 2014, Bingo died from pneumonia. This left Stella and her two daughters at the park for more than a year. However, in 2015, Ran II was transferred back to Kamogawa Sea World. That same day, Stella's grandson, Earth, was transferred to the Port of Nagoya to take her place. See the reasons for Earth's move under his own story.

Stella and Lynn spent a lot of time with Earth and got along well with him. However, as Earth matured, Stella and Lynn were separated from him more often. The three were occasionally reunited, but it was usually Lynn who performed with Earth until his death in 2025.

In March 2024, Stella moved to the new Kobe Suma Sea World. The day after her transfer, a video appeared showing Stella calling out for Lynn and making loud vocalizations. She stayed isolated at the park until Ran II was transferred to the facility a month later. Despite being separated for nearly a decade, the two got along well, seeming to still have a mother–calf relationship. The park officially opened to the public on 1 June 2024. Since Stella had not performed waterworks in Nagoya, she had to relearn the basics once she arrived at Kobe Suma. She and Ran II performed them on opening day and have continued doing them regularly.

==== Takara ====
Takara (Japanese for "treasure") was born on 9 July 1991, at SWC to Kasatka and Kotar. She was the second "Baby Shamu" born at SWC, after Orkid in 1988. She gave birth to her first calf, a female named Kohana on 3 May 2002. Kasatka was by her side during the labor and she and Takara helped assist Kohana to the surface to take her first breath. She was conceived via artificial insemination, the father being Tilikum, a bull orca who had been living on the other side of the country at SeaWorld Orlando. Takara is an average sized female measuring 17.3-foot (5.3 m), and weighs 5,100 lb (2,300 kg).

Takara and Kohana were transferred to SeaWorld Orlando in 2004, likely to give Taku a mate. A year later, Takara gave birth to her second calf, a male named Trua, fathered by Taku. Kohana was later transferred out of SeaWorld Orlando to Loro Parque, a Spanish amusement park in the Canary Islands.

Takara was transferred to SeaWorld San Antonio in February 2009 in a supposed effort to improve space at SeaWorld Orlando. The move angered many since it separated her from her son, Trua. However, other SeaWorld visitors and workers reported that she would often act aggressively toward Trua. It was later confirmed she was pregnant at the time (again from Tilikum). On 7 January 2010, Takara gave birth to another female calf in the main tank of the "Shamu Theatre" at SeaWorld San Antonio. On 16 March 2010, she was named Sakari, which is an Inuit word for "sweet". Takara became a grandmother on 12 October 2010, when her calf Kohana gave birth to her first calf Adán on 12 October 2010. Kohana had also given birth to Victoria on 3 August 2012. Victoria died on 16 June 2013, when she was 10 months old, of intestinal issues. Takara delivered her fourth calf on 6 December 2013, a healthy female named Kamea. She gave birth to her fifth calf (and SeaWorld's last breeding calf), a female named Kyara, on 19 April 2017. Kyara died two months later, on 24 July, due to pneumonia.

Takara was featured in an episode of That's My Baby, where she gave birth to her first calf, Kohana.

==== Tuar ====
Tuar is a 27-year-old male orca who lives at SeaWorld San Antonio. His father is Tilikum and his mother is Kalina. He was born at SeaWorld Orlando on 22 June 1999. Tuar used to perform waterworks until they were stopped in 2010.

==== Trua ====
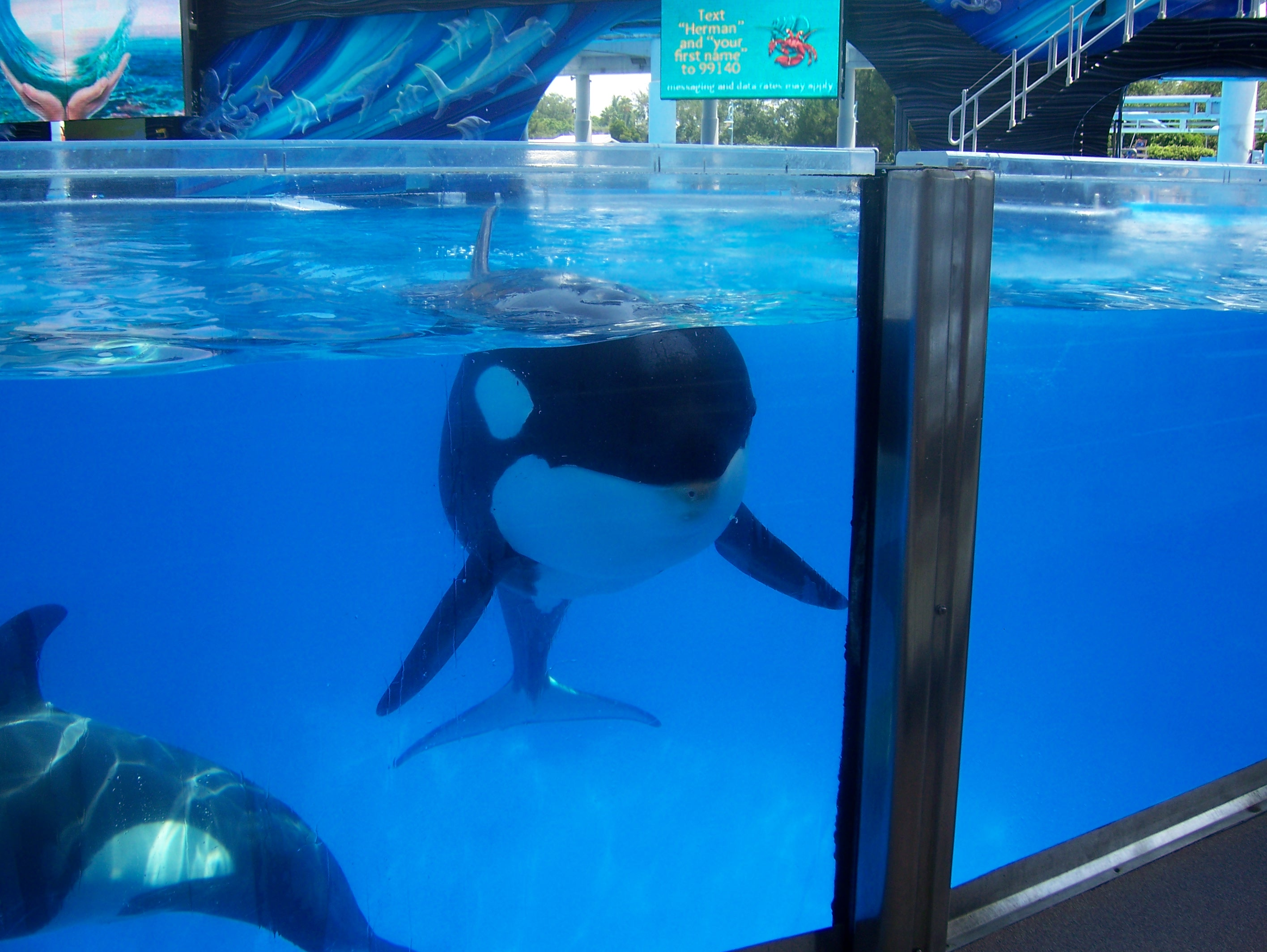
Trua, who lives at Seaworld Orlando

Trua is a male orca born at SeaWorld Orlando on 23 November 2005. His parents are Takara and Taku, and his grandfather is Tilikum. Takara and Kohana (his sister) had just been moved to SeaWorld Orlando when she and Taku met. At the time of Trua's birth, Kohana was by Takara's side and thus acted as the midwife. Trua currently lives at SeaWorld Orlando with four other orcas: Katina (matriarch), Nalani, Malia and Makaio.

Trua had been learning waterworks before they were stopped in 2010. Trua's mother Takara was moved to SeaWorld San Antonio on 5 February 2009. Trua is easily identified because of his three dots and belly freckles. Trua has a dot in his eyepatch, and two dots on his neck. His freckles earned him the nickname, "Freckles". As of July 2021, Trua, now 16 years old, measures at a length of 19 feet and weighs 6,600 lb (3,000 kg). Despite this, Trua is not yet fully grown.

==== Ulises ====
Ulises is the oldest and 2nd largest male orca in captivity with Ikaika now being the largest. He is 21 feet (6.4 m) and weighs about 9,800 pounds (4,400 kg). He lives at SeaWorld San Diego in California with seven other whales. He is often nicknamed, "Uli" or "Uli Bear" due to his gentle personality. He was captured in 1980 in Iceland and lived at several European parks including Barcelona Zoo, before being transported to SeaWorld San Diego in 1994. He became a father in 2011, when his son Moana was born through artificial insemination to Wikie at Marineland Antibes, France. On 2 December 2014, at 12:34 p.m., a young female named Kalia gave birth to Ulises's daughter, Amaya, at SeaWorld San Diego. It is unknown whether the calf was conceived naturally or through artificial insemination. He is believed to have a low sperm count.

==== Wikie ====
Wikie (pronounced WEE-kee) is female Icelandic killer whale who lives at Marineland Antibes. The park closed down in January 2025. She has been the matriarch of the Marineland Antibes pod for a while, but the pod is now decreased to just her and her son Keijo. She was born there tail-first at 7:00 CST on 1 June 2001. Her mother is Sharkane and her father is Kim II. In 2018, she made national headlines by becoming "the world's first talking whale" when she imitated human speech. Wikie has been recorded saying "hello", "bye bye", and "Amy", and even counted to three.

For the first couple of months, Wikie and her mom were kept in the back pools, as Sharkane was very protective of Wikie; even seeming to "hide" her from visitors at times. However, Wikie eventually appeared in shows with Sharkane by the time she was a few months old. Wikie's other two siblings, Inouk and Shouka, both lived in Marineland at the time. However, on 20 May 2002, Shouka was moved to Six Flags in the US to prevent her from breeding with her father Kim II. This left Wikie, Sharkane, Kim II, Freya, Inouk, and Valentin as the only whales at Marineland. In 2005, Wikie's father Kim II died from pneumonia.

When Wikie was young, she spent most of her time with her mom Sharkane and older brother Inouk. When she was a few years old, both she and her mom were being trained for artificial insemination. But before the two could be inseminated, Sharkane died in 2009 from an infection. Wikie was artificially inseminated with Ulises' semen shortly after (still in 2009). Ulises lives at SeaWorld San Diego and, at the time, it was believed that he was not capable of siring calves. However, after multiple attempts of artificial insemination, Wikie became pregnant. She gave birth to both her and Ulises' first calf on 16 March 2011. Her calf was the first orca to be born through artificial insemination in Europe and the third in the world. Marineland Antibes initially reported that Wikie had given birth to a daughter, who they named Moana. However, it later became clear that Moana was a male, but Marineland decided that they would keep the name anyway. In 20 November 2013, Wikie gave birth to her second calf. The father was never confirmed, but is widely believed to be Valentin. On 14 April 2014, Marineland announced the calf had been named Keijo.

In 2015, both Freya and Valentin died. This left Wikie, Moana, Keijo, and Inouk as the only whales at Marineland for the remainder of the park's operation. The four all got along well with each other. Wikie was a good mother to her calves and had a close bond with them for many years.

In 2018, Wikie made national attention for being the world's first "talking killer whale". She was trained to mimic human sounds, such as "hello", "bye-bye", and "1-2-3". She could also say the name of one of her trainers: "Amy". When learning these vocals, she picked up the given phrases rather quickly. Before this, it was thought that killer whales could not mimic human speech, as they do not have the same vocal ability as humans do. However, Wikie's imitations were found to be clear copies of her trainer's speech.

In 2023, it was revealed that Marineland was planning on moving the remainder of their orca pod to another facility. Originally, the four would be moved to a facility in Japan; either Kamogawa, Kobe Suma, or Port of Nagoya. However, on 18 October 2023, Moana died unexpectedly during the night. His death affected the whales deeply, especially Wikie. For some time, it was unknown how his death would affect the move. However, transport equipment was found at the orca stadium that January, so that staff could begin exposing the orcas to them. Two months later, in March, Inouk also died.

For over a year, it was unknown what would happen with Wikie and Keijo. Plans to move them out of the now-close Marineland were continuously blocked by the French Government. An idea to move them to a sanctuary was proposed but was turned down because no sanctuaries that currently exist. Plans to move the two whales to a Japanese facility were also turned down. In March 2025, it was revealed that Wikie and Keijo were going to be moved to Loro Parque by mid-April. However, the transfer was blocked once again (by Spanish authorities). As of May 2025, no plans in place to move Wikie and Keijo out of Marineland.

=== Deceased ===
This is a list of some notable orcas that died in captivity. It does not include every captive death.

==== O-1087 ====
O-1087 was a Japanese orca and the first captive orca to survive in captivity, accidentally captured on 22 May 1911. After the bycatch, the whale was moved to Kanonji Port, Kanonji City in Japan and "used for show". It is not known what happened to O-1087 after that day, though the whale likely either died or escaped the enclosure.

==== Amaya ====
Amaya was a female orca born on 2 December 2014, at SeaWorld San Diego. Her mother was Kalia and her father was Ulises. Amaya was Kalia's first calf. She was born tail-first and was 6.5 feet long with a weight of 350 pounds at birth; her heritage was 93.75% Icelandic and 6.25% southern resident. She died unexpectedly on 19 August 2021 from an unnamed gastro-intestinal disease.

==== Baby Shamu II ====
Baby Shamu II was born at SeaWorld San Diego in California on 5 January 1986. Her parents were Kenau and Winston. Because she was the second orca born at a SeaWorld park, she was nicknamed Baby Shamu II. The original Baby Shamu, aka Kalina, was her older half-sister, though Kalina had a different mother. Baby Shamu II was never given a real name as she died on 16 January 1986, just 12 days after she was born. The cause of death was a heart defect. Young orcas are born with heart valves open and they should close soon after birth. Baby Shamu II had a respiratory infection and this worsened her condition. One of the valves did not close, which caused Baby Shamu II to die. She was 7 feet (2.16 m) long and she weighed 135 kg (297 lb).

==== Bingo ====
Bingo was a 31-year-old male orca who lived at Port of Nagoya Public Aquarium. He was captured in Iceland in 1984 and is the father of Lovey, Lara, Sarah, Ran II and Lynn and the grandfather of Earth and Luna. He died on 2 August 2014, of a respiratory illness.

==== Chimo ====
Chimo (also known as T4), was a young female transient (exclusive mammal-eater) orca exhibited in Sealand of the Pacific in South Oak Bay at The Oak Bay Marina, near the city of Victoria, British Columbia, Canada from 1970 to 1972. Chimo was the only partially albino orca ever exhibited in captivity. Years before her capture, another pure white orca was spotted in what is suspected to be the same pod, and named "Alice". Alice was never captured, and vanished in the 1960s. Chimo was captured when trying to find a mate for the park's star attraction, Haida. Chimo's probable mother was another orca by the name of Scarredjaw Cow (T3). She was captured alongside Chimo. Chimo died in 1972 from complications caused by Chédiak–Higashi syndrome, the syndrome which caused her albinism. Chimo never bore any calves.

==== Earth ====
Earth (アース, Āsu) was born at Kamogawa Sea World located in Chiba Prefecture, Japan, on 13 October 2008. "Kamogawa is the location of Kamogawa Seaworld, which opened in 1970 ... Lovey gave birth to Earth on October 13, 2008, which makes Lovey the first captive-born mother in a Japanese marine park". His father is Oscar who died on 20 December 2012.

On 19 July 2012, Lovey gave birth to Earth's sister named Luna. He showed great interest in Luna, and the two often played together. However, Earth would often play "too rough" with the young calf, causing Lovey to displace him for it. His mother's aggressive behavior towards him would only increase as time went on. After months of aggression and displacement from Lovey, he was separated and put in the back pool with his father Oscar. Later in 2012, on 20 December, Oscar died after becoming ill just two days before. Not long after his death, trainers attempted to reunite Earth with the rest of the pod. Things would not go well, as Earth received the same level of aggression as he had before. For this reason, Earth was again separated and remained alone in the back pool.

On 7 December 2015, Earth (then age 7) was moved to the Port of Nagoya Public Aquarium in order to improve his living conditions. He joined his grandmother Stella, and her new daughter Lynn and switching places with his aunt, Ran II. Earth formed a close bond with Lynn and spent a lot of time with her and Stella. As years passed, Earth was more frequently separated from the females and had to spend most of his time alone. On the occasion that they were grouped, Earth and Lynn were typically the pair performing in shows. In March 2024, Stella was moved out of Nagoya and into the newly built Kobe Suma Sea World. Since then, Earth and Lynn were grouped together. They would be seen in and out of shows and maintained a close bond. Earth died at Port of Nagoya Public Aquarium on 3 August 2025, leaving behind Lynn as the only orca left in Port of Nagoya Public Aquarium.

==== Freya ====
Freya was a 35-year-old female orca who lived at Marineland of Antibes. She was captured in October 1982 alongside Haida II, Kim II, Nootka IV, and an unnamed male. She and Kim II went to Marineland Antibes from Hafnarfjörður Aquarium. She became the first European orca to become pregnant. Freya gave birth in March 1991 to a stillborn calf. She gave birth to another stillborn in March 1993. Sometime between this calf and her next, Freya had a tumor removed, leaving a white indent on her side. Freya gave birth to Valentin on 13 February 1996. In March 2001, Freya had yet another stillborn calf. In April 2003, Freya gave birth to her final calf and her fourth stillborn. She ceased to become pregnant due to birth control and the death of her mate Kim II in 2005. Freya was very depressed, but Valentin usually was able to cheer her up. Freya became a grandmother on 20 November 2013, when Valentin fathered a calf named Keijo, however, since the calf's mother Wikie was Valentin's half-sister, Valentin being the father has not been confirmed. After months of fighting an unknown illness, Freya lost her battle on 20 June 2015, leaving behind her son Valentin and likely grandson Keijo.

==== Gudrun ====
Gudrun (Goo drun, Icel. Guðrún) was an Icelandic female orca who lived at Dolfinarium Harderwijk in the Netherlands and at SeaWorld Orlando in Florida. Gudrun was caught close to the coast of Iceland on 25 October 1976. She was kept in captivity in the Dolfinarium Harderwijk in the Netherlands, where she was the main attraction. In 1987, Gudrun was moved to SeaWorld Orlando on a breeding loan. Gudrun gave birth to Taima on 11 July 1989, at 16:45 EST during a thunderstorm. Gudrun gave birth to Nyar on 31 December 1993. Nyar suffered with illness often. She was so both mentally and physically ill, it was reported that Gudrun tried to drown her during several shows. Nyar died at the age of two years in April 1996. On 21 February 1996, Gudrun went into labor with her last calf, which was fathered by Tilikum. After 20 hours of labor, Gudrun was unable to deliver the calf. Eventually after the physical intervention of park staff, Gudrun delivered a stillborn calf of undetermined sex. Due to complications from the delivery, Gudrun died four days later.

In 1982, Gudrun was the subject of an experiment in two-communications, designed to see if she could learn new words and incorporate them into her vocabulary.

==== Hoi Wai ====
Hoi Wai was a female orca captured near Iceland in October 1977. Initially brought to the Saedyrasafnid Aquarium in Iceland, she was moved in late October 1977 to the Dolfinarium Harderwijk in the Netherlands. Initially named Peanuts, she was moved to the Windsor Safari Park, where she was to stay until being moved to Ocean Park Hong Kong early in 1979, and where she was renamed Suzie Wong. Due to a dispute between SeaWorld and the safari park, she was transferred to Clacton Pier in August 1978 for the remainder of her training. A storm on New Year's Day 1979 damaged Clacton Pier, and she was sent back to Windsor Safari Park until the end of January.

On 27 January 1979, Suzie Wong was finally moved to Ocean Park Hong Kong, where she was renamed Hoi Wai, and would perform for life. She died on 21 April 1997, after a bloody wound was found in her intestines. Hoi wai was about 5 metres (16 ft) long and weighed about 1,800 kilograms (4,000 lb). She was the only orca at Ocean Park Hong Kong. A newspaper claimed that her skeleton is preserved at Cape D'Aguilar Marine Reserve, near Shek O, but the skeleton is actually from a Bryde's whale that stranded itself in Victoria Harbour in 1955.

Hoi Wai made an appearance in a movie called Moon Warriors.

==== Hyak II ====
Hyak II, more commonly known as Hyak, was about a year old when he was captured in Pender Harbour, British Columbia, Canada on 24 April 1968. He was captured with six other pod members, including Corky II and Natsidalia, who was thought to be his mother. He was probably from the A5 Pod. The captured whales were kept at Pender Harbour for some weeks before being transferred, and Natsidalia did not survive. Hyak was transferred to the Vancouver Aquarium, where he was kept with Skana, an orca captured the previous year. After Skana died in 1980, the aquarium purchased four new orcas captured in Iceland, and two of them—Finna and Bjossa—were transferred to the Vancouver Aquarium. Hyak and Bjossa produced a calf in 1987, but it only survived a short time. He sired another calf on Bjossa—K'yosha, but he did not live to see the calf's birth, as he died of pneumonia in February 1991. K'yosha only lived a few months beyond her father's death.

==== Junior ====
Junior was captured in Icelandic waters in November 1984. After a short stay at the Saedrysafnid Aquarium, he arrived at Marineland Ontario in Canada on 15 November 1986. He did not adjust well to his new home, was hard to train, and did not get along well with his fellow orca tank-mates. Junior was eventually moved to a small tank in Marineland's warehouse with no natural sunlight or air and noisy overhead fans. Occasionally he shared his small tank with several dolphins. Marineland tried to keep Junior's conditions a secret, but members of the public released photos and films. Junior died in 1994.

==== K1/Taku ====
K1 was also named Taku. He was captured in August 1973 in Pedder Bay, British Columbia. While several other orcas that were caught with him were sold to other marine parks, K1 was too big to be sold. He was released on 27 October 1973, with a radio tag attached to his dorsal fin. Two nicks were cut by Dr Michael Bigg into his dorsal fin to make it easier to identify and find him. He was given the adoption name of Taku. K1 reunited with his pod and was seen many times. K1 disappeared in 1997 and was presumed to have died at the age of 41, as his year of birth was believed to be 1955. K1 was a full blooded Southern Resident orca. He was 23 feet (7.0 m) long.

==== Katina ====
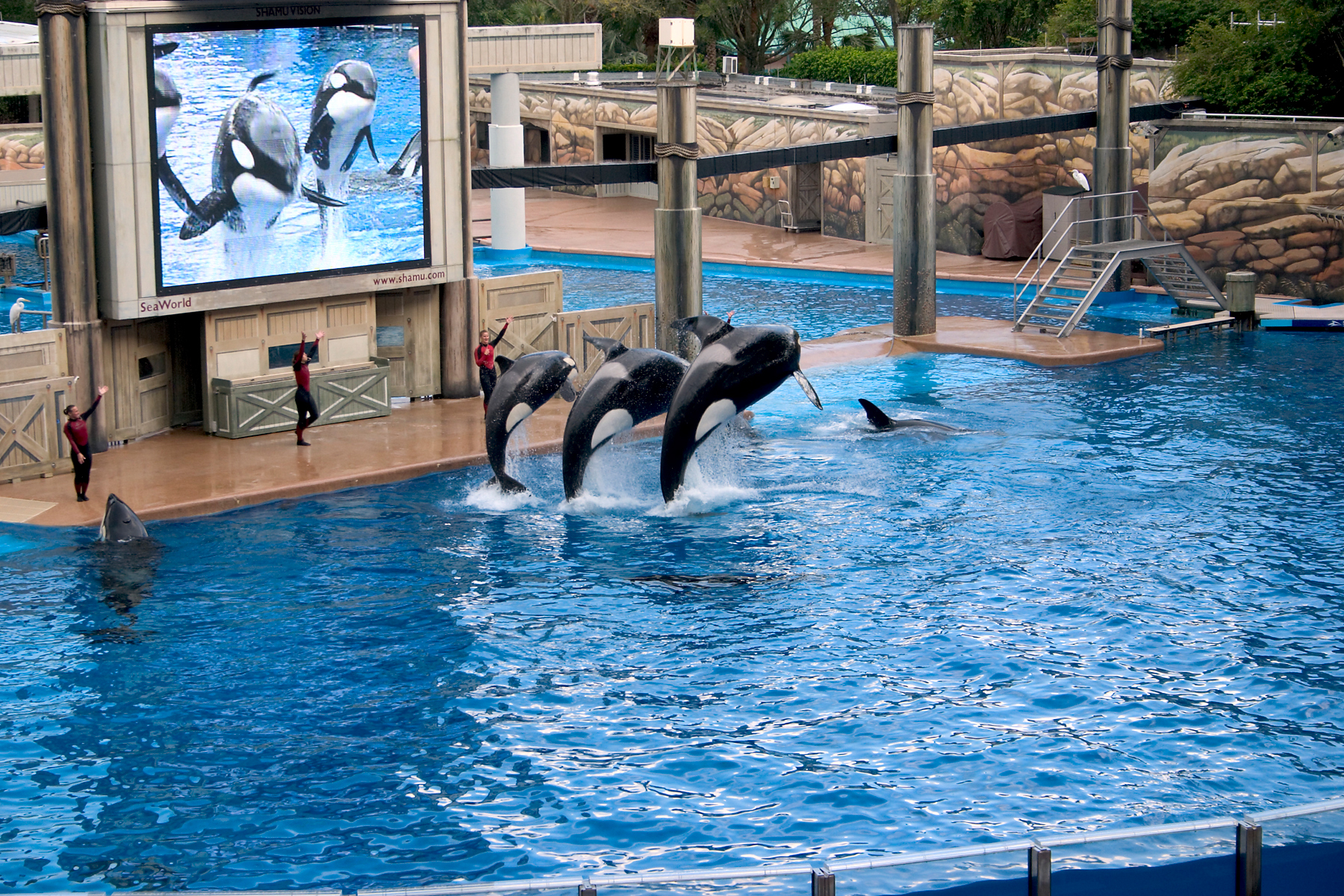
From Left: Ikaika, Katina, and Taku perform in SeaWorld Orlando

Katina was a female who lived in SeaWorld Orlando. She was captured near Iceland at about three years of age on 26 October 1978. She was the most successful breeding female orca in captivity. At 16 feet 4 inches (4.98 m) and about 5,600 pounds (2,500 kg), Katina was small compared to other females, but she was rather bulky.

Upon her capture, Katina was purchased by Marineland (Ontario). In 1979, Katina was bought by SeaWorld and was sent to their park in San Diego. In 1982, Katina was moved to SeaWorld Ohio in Aurora, Ohio, with another female named Kasatka, with whom she was captured in 1978. For two years, the two would perform in the Ohio park during the summer months and then be moved back to San Diego for the winter. Finally, in 1984, Katina was transferred to the SeaWorld in Orlando.

Katina became pregnant in early spring of 1984 at SeaWorld San Diego from a male named Winston. Soon after, she was moved back to SeaWorld Ohio for the summer. The trainers soon realized she was pregnant, so she was moved to Orlando at the end of the summer season, where she gave birth on 26 September 1985, to a female who was named Kalina. Although ten orca calves had been born in captivity prior to Kalina, none had survived past a few weeks. Kalina was the first orca calf to be successfully born and raised in captivity. Kalina was taken from her mother at 4 years 5 months and conducted on a trip around all four SeaWorld parks.

In early 1987, an adult male named Kanduke arrived in Orlando. He and Katina soon mated. Katina bore her second calf on 4 November 1988, a female named Katerina. In early 1991 at a very early age Katerina was transferred out of Orlando. Katerina died on 5 May 1999, at SeaWorld San Antonio at 10.5 years of age. A male named Tilikum came to SeaWorld in January 1992. It was not long before Katina was pregnant again. She gave birth to her first son on 9 September 1993, named Taku. Katina's next calf came on 27 December 1996, a female named Unna. Her fifth calf was a male born on 25 August 2002, named Ikaika. Katina gave birth to her sixth calf, a female named Nalani, on 18 September 2006. She gave birth to her seventh calf, a male named Makaio on 9 October 2010, at 7:28 p.m. The great-grandmother went into labor at 6:47 p.m. and delivered a 7-foot (2.1 m)-long, 350-pound male calf. He swam to the surface moments later for his first breath. She has six grandchildren, Keet, Keto, Tuar, Skyla, Trua and Nalani, as well as four great-grandchildren, Kalia, Halyn, Adán and Vicky. Kalia gave birth to Katina's first great-great-grandchild, Amaya, on 2 December 2014.

Katina lived with two of her seven calves (Nalani and Makaio) and her grandson (Trua). She was always with her calf, but was also with Nalani quite often. She was grouped with her son Makaio, Trua, Malia and Nalani.

Katina appeared on a That's My Baby episode, where she gave birth to Ikaika.

She died on 20 December 2025.

==== Kalina ====
Kalina (26 September 1985 – 4 October 2010) was the first captive-born orca calf to survive more than a few days. Kalina's mother is an Icelandic female named Katina, and her father, Winston (also known as Ramu III) was a Pacific Southern Resident, making Kalina an Atlantic/Pacific hybrid – a unique situation that would not have occurred in the wild. Kalina measured 17 feet 9 inches (5.41 m) and weighed approximately 6,300 pounds (2,900 kg).

Kalina first appeared in shows at SeaWorld Orlando in 1986, billed as "Baby Shamu", performing with her mother. On 12 February 1990, Kalina was transferred to SeaWorld Ohio. She was moved again in October of that year to SeaWorld San Diego, and again on 30 May 1991, to SeaWorld San Antonio. In October 1994, Kalina was moved back to SeaWorld Orlando, where she lived with eight other killer whales, including her mother and a half sister.

Kalina gave birth to her first calf, a male named Keet, on 2 February 1993, at SeaWorld Texas. Kalina was only seven and a half years old at the time of Keet's birth – an extremely young age for an orca to become a mother. Kalina became pregnant again shortly after Keet's birth, and was moved back to SeaWorld Orlando in October 1994, where she gave birth to her second calf, another male, Keto on 17 June 1995. She gave birth to another male, Tuar, on 22 June 1999. Kalina bore her fourth calf and first daughter, on 9 February 2004, named Skyla. Both Skyla and Keto were moved to Loro Parque later on and have since then died. Kalina was a gentle whale, learned quickly, and was used a lot in shows. She was used as a "starter whale" for new trainers. On Monday 4 October 2010, less than four months after Taima's death, Kalina died of preacute bacteremia sepsis at the age of 25. She has since become a great-grandmother with the birth of Amaya in December 2014.

==== Kandu V ====
Kandu V was a dominant female Icelandic orca, caught in 1977 and kept at SeaWorld San Diego in California. On 21 August 1989, she attempted to rake a 24-year-old newcomer orca, Corky II, during a live show. She struck Corky II behind her dorsal fin; the resulting impact fracturing Kandu's upper jaw and severing major arteries. The crowd was quickly ushered out, and after a 45-minute hemorrhage, Kandu V died. Her daughter, Orkid, was 11 months old at the time of the accident.

==== Kandu VII ====
Kandu VII was a male orca housed at Marineland of Canada in the 1980s. He was caught in Iceland. Kandu VII fathered 11 orca calves there: six with Nootka V and five with Kiska. None of Kandu's calves survived past age six.

==== Kanduke ====
Kanduke (can-duke) was captured from T pod in British Columbia, Canada, in August 1975. When captured, he was about 14 ft long (4.3 m) and weighed about 2,600 pounds (1,200 kg), which made him about 4–5 years old. His mother is thought to be T7. He was sent to Sealand of the Pacific, Victoria, and then sold to Marineland of Canada. In January 1987, he was sold and moved to SeaWorld Orlando.

While at Marineland of Canada, he did 'water work' with his trainers, but once at SeaWorld he was described as a "moody and unpredictable" whale and the 'water work' was stopped. At SeaWorld Orlando, Kanduke often fought with a younger Icelandic male named Kotar. The aggression became increasingly serious. After an incident in which Kotar bit Kanduke's penis and caused an infection and show cancellations, the exhibitors decided to move the smaller whale to the newly opened SeaWorld San Antonio. On 20 September 1990, Kanduke died of St. Louis encephalitis, which is transmitted by mosquitoes. The cause of his death was later determined using information from his necropsy report provided by the Freedom of Information Act. This disease is non-existent in wild orcas because they do not spend enough time on the surface for mosquitoes to bite them. However, in captivity, the behavior of "logging" (i.e. just floating at the surface) puts orcas at risk for mosquito-borne illnesses. Kanduke has since become a grandfather with the births of Sumar, Tekoa, and Malia.

==== Kasatka ====
Kasatka was a 41-year-old female orca who lived at SeaWorld San Diego and the mother of Takara, Nakai, Kalia and Makani. She was the park's dominant orca, and she could be seen putting the other whales in their places including her own offspring. She was captured off the coast of Iceland on 26 October 1978, about the age of two. Her name probably comes from the Russian word Kasatka (Russian: Кaсатка), a generic name for orcas. She was 17.7 feet (5.4 m) long and weighs around 5,950 pounds (2,700 kg). Kasatka became a grandmother for the first time when her daughter Takara gave birth to her first calf, a female born 3 May 2002, named Kohana. Takara gave birth a second time, on 23 November 2005, to a male named Trua in SeaWorld Orlando. Takara gave birth to her third calf, a female born 7 January 2010, named Sakari. Kasatka became a great-grandmother on 13 October 2010, when Kohana gave birth to her first calf Adán. Kasatka gave birth to her fourth calf and second son on 14 February 2013, at 6:33 a.m. after a one-hour labor. The calf was later named Makani.

Kasatka had shown aggression to humans. In 1993 she tried to bite Ken Peters during a show, and again in 1999. On 30 November 2006, Kasatka grabbed Peters again and dragged him underwater during their show. Peters escaped and was later in good condition despite being underwater for a "brief" amount of time. Since this incident, Kasatka had been barred from performing waterworks with trainers and was never reintroduced to them.

Kasatka was euthanized 15 August 2017, after battling a chronic pulmonary infection for many years. Reason for euthanization was stated as chronic lung disease. She was euthanized after her health turned for the worst a few days leading up to 15 August.

==== Katy ====
The 9-foot (2.7 m) calf was one of 15 Southern resident orcas, probably all from K Pod, who were involved in the Yukon Harbor orca capture operation. This first ever multi-orca capture, planned by Ted Griffin and his Seattle Public Aquarium party, began on 15 February 1967. The orcas were encircled by a modified, extra long purse seine net in shallow water in Yukon Harbor, on the west side of Puget Sound. Corraling and transferring selected whales to the aquarium at Pier 56, Seattle, proved to be a long and difficult process, however. Three died, two escaped, five were eventually secured by the aquarium, and five were released in the end, after 17 days inside a net.

On 2 March, the small calf to be named Katy was shipped across Puget Sound to Pier 56. In her first published photograph, she shared a tank at the Seattle Public Aquarium with her as yet unnamed podmates: Kandu, Kilroy, and Ramu.

Griffin did not plan to keep all the orcas, and only Katy and Kandu remained in Seattle, where "schoolchildren crowded around the pool to get a look at the 'baby' killer whales." The aquarium's regular advertising featured the baby orcas, photographed with trainer Jerry Watmore, with hourly feedings as the leading attraction.

While at the Vancouver Boat Show with Katy's podmate known as Walter the Whale, Griffin organized "the first whale-to-whale telephone call in history." Katy and Kandu were at the other end of the line in Seattle, as pictured in the Seattle Times, but for the first 45 minutes, Walter only got a response from "two seals in a nearby tank", until finally the whales began talking "like crazy".

After two months, "the popular calf...died after ingesting a stick tossed into the pool by a careless visitor." In the evening of 15 May, a veterinarian removed the piece of wood, but Katy's esophagus wall was torn and she died early the next morning. She was the second orca to die at Pier 56, preceded in 1966 by Namu.

==== Kayla ====
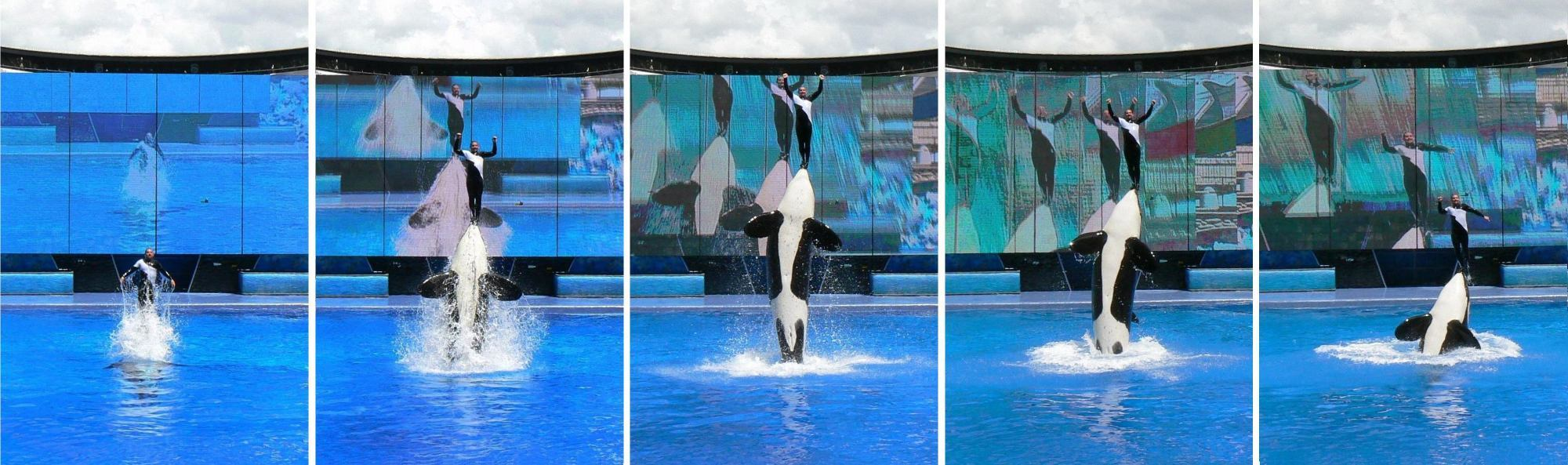
Sequence of trainer demonstrating a nose stand on top of Kayla during the Believe show at SeaWorld Orlando

Kayla (26 November 1988 – 28 January 2019) was a female who lived at SeaWorld San Antonio and SeaWorld Orlando. Her parents were Kenau and Orky II, both deceased. Kayla was about 20-foot (6.1 m) long and weighed about 6,200 pounds (2,800 kg). Kayla lived with her mother for the first two and a half years of her life. Kenau was moved to SeaWorld Orlando in January 1991, and Kayla was moved to SeaWorld Ohio in April 1991. Kayla lived there for the next eight years with another young female, named Katerina, who was three weeks older than she was. After Katerina was moved out, an older female named Winnie was moved in.

In November 1999, Kayla and Winnie were both transferred to SeaWorld San Antonio. Kayla and Winnie joined a female named Haida II and her son Kyuquot. A young male named Keto arrived in March 2001. Haida II died on 1 August of that year, making Winnie the new dominant female. Winnie died on 11 April 2002. Kayla became the new dominant orca in the stadium and was until her relocation to Orlando in 2006. After the death of Winnie, only three whales were left in the park: Kayla, Kyuquot and Keto. A young female by the name of Unna was moved to the park in December 2002 to settle down Kyuquot and Keto, because the two maturing males were constantly fighting over Kayla. In November 2006, Kayla was transferred to SeaWorld Orlando leaving behind a mate Keet, and their daughter Halyn was raised by Unna immediately after Kayla's transfer. Once Kayla arrived, she immediately gave up her dominant role to Katina, who has been the dominant female there since 1988. In spring 2007, Kayla miscarried a male calf, likely the son of Keet.

Kayla gave birth to her first calf on 9 October 2005, a female named Halyn. Halyn was moved to a special animal care facility to be hand raised. Halyn lived in Animal Care in a different part of the park, and in May joined her family at Shamu Stadium. Halyn's father is Keet. On 15 June 2008, Halyn died unexpectedly.

On 28 January 2019, SeaWorld announced that Kayla had unexpectedly died after a two-day battle with an unknown illness. Veterinarians tried their best to treat Kayla, but she succumbed to her illness on the morning of 28 January. She was 30 years old. The final cause of death has been announced and Kayla's "unknown illness" was lung disease.

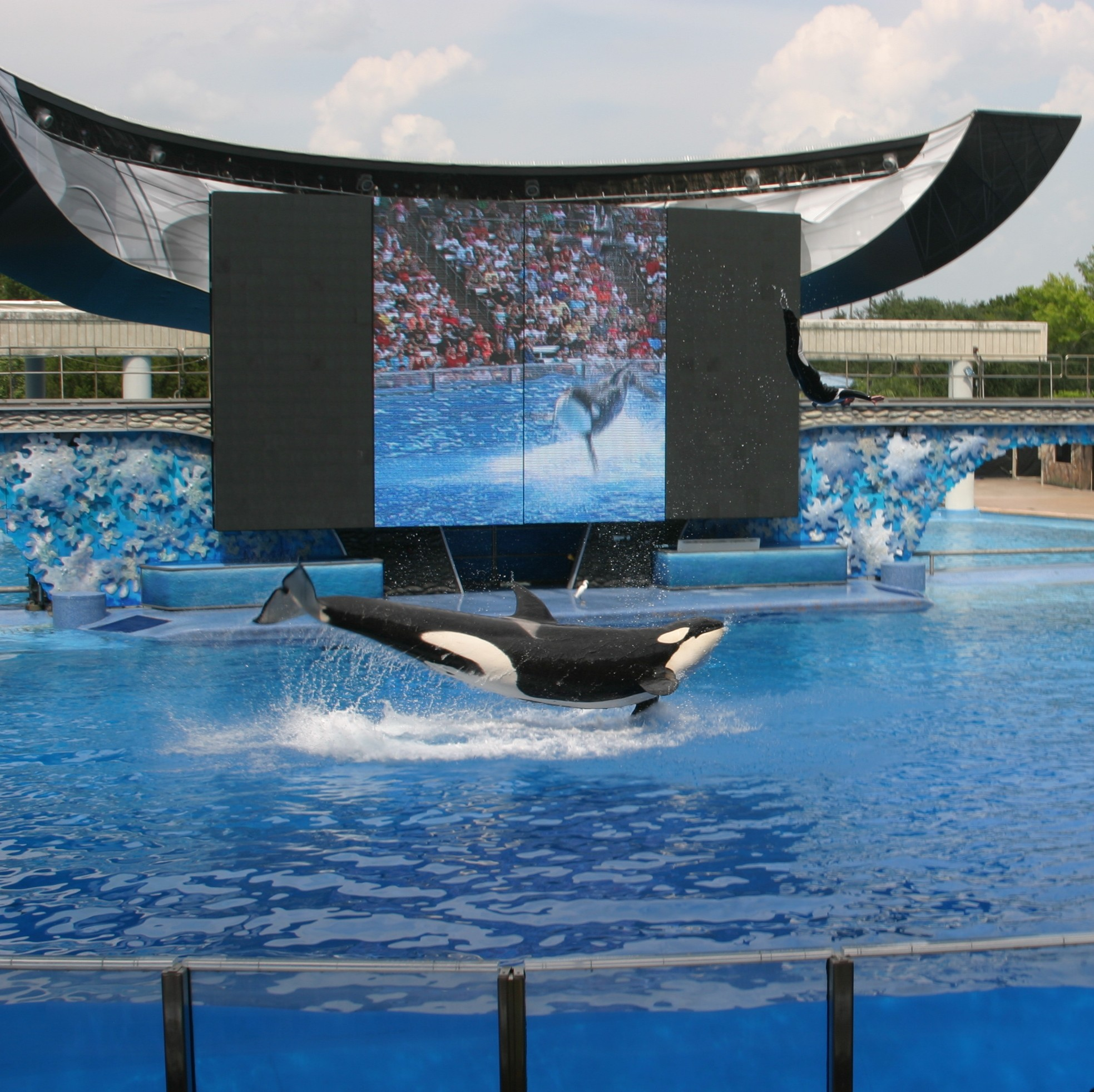
Kayla appears to "hover" over the water after launching a trainer into the air. The "Believe" stage is seen in the background. (June 2007)

==== Keiko ====
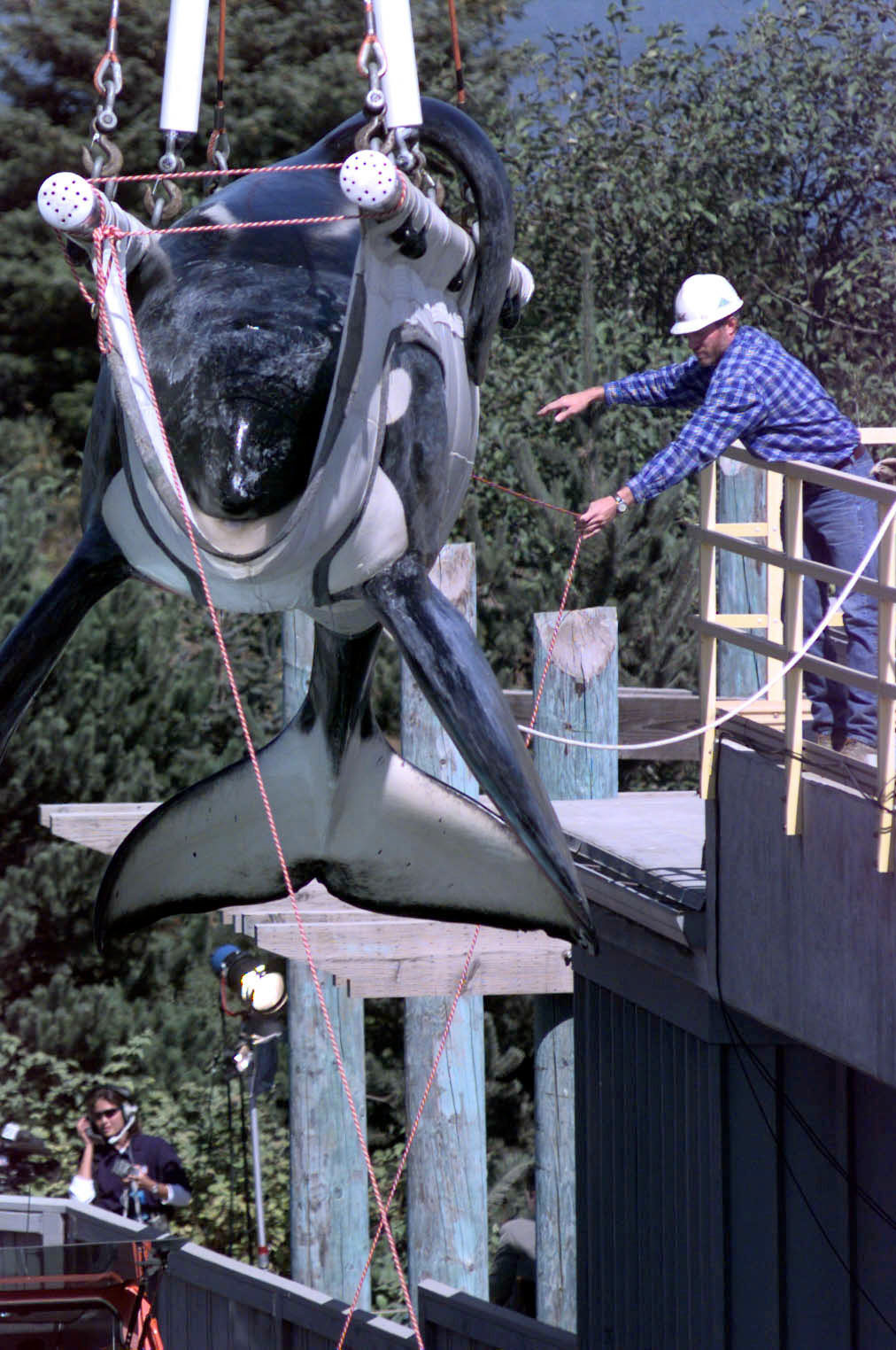
Keiko is weighed as he is loaded into his specially made transport tank at the Oregon Coast Aquarium, on 9 September 1998.

Keiko (1977 – 12 December 2003) was an orca who starred in the first of three Free Willy movies. Keiko died on 12 December 2003, after beaching himself during the night; pneumonia was later determined as the probable cause of death. Keiko was captured near Iceland in 1979 and sold to the Icelandic aquarium in Hafnarfjörður. Three years later, he was sold to Marineland of Canada, where he first started performing for the public and developed skin lesions indicative of poor health. He was then sold to Reino Aventura (now named Six Flags Mexico), an amusement park in Mexico City, in 1985. He was the star of the movie Free Willy in 1993.

The publicity from his role in Free Willy led to an effort by Warner Brothers Studio to find him a better home. Donations from the studio and Craig McCaw led to the establishment of the Free Willy Keiko Foundation in February 1995. With donations from the foundation and millions of school children, the Oregon Coast Aquarium in Newport, Oregon, spent over US$7 million to construct facilities to return him to health with the hope of returning him to the wild. He was airlifted by UPS to his new home on 7 January 1996, with a length of 24 feet (7.3 m) and weighing 3,500 kilograms (7,700 lb). During his years in Oregon, he gained over a ton in weight.

On 9 September 1998, he was flown to Klettsvik Bay in Vestmannaeyjar in Iceland, and gradually reintroduced to the wild, returning to the open sea in July 2002. Keiko died on 12 December 2003, at the age of 27. Following requests from fans of the orca and Free Willy, the Oregon Coast Aquarium held a memorial service for him on 20 February 2004. 700 people attended the service, at which the aquarium's veterinary chaplain said, "Keiko was not one of our kind, but nonetheless was still one of us." There is a memorial site for Keiko set up by the locals in Heim Municipality, Norway, near the Skålvikfjorden, where the orca spent the last year of his life.

==== Kenau ====
Kenau died in 1991 while pregnant with her third calf, whose father was Kotar. The calf fetus was male. Kenau was Kayla's mother.

==== Keto ====
Keto was a bull orca who was born on 17 June 1995. His parents are Kalina and Kotar. Keto has lived at all four SeaWorld parks since he was separated from his mother at age 3.

When Keto was 10 years old he was moved to Loro Parque with Tekoa, his half-niece Kohana, and his half-sister Skyla. On Christmas Eve 2009, Keto killed trainer Alexis Martinez during training. Keto died on 22 November 2024 at the age of 29 in Loro Parque.

==== Kim (Oum) ====
Kim was captured in November 1976 in Icelandic waters. He was sickly throughout his captivity. At one point he became blind. Several therapies were tried, including ozone therapy and herbal remedies at the last, but to no avail. He died in Marineland of Antibes on 24 July 1982. A necropsy revealed a lung abscess.

==== Kim II ====
Kim II was a male orca who was captured at the age of 2 in October 1982 with Freya, Haida II and Nootka IV in Iceland. He was then sold to Marineland Antibes with Freya for reproduction. He sired many calves : Shouka, Inouk, Wikie and Valentin. Kim II was 6,3m long and weighted 5 tons. He was very close to his daughter Shouka but she was sent to Six Flags, later to SeaWorld San Diego. Kim II died on 23 November 2005, of pneumonia.

==== Kiska ====
Kiska (died 9 March 2023) was housed at Marineland of Canada. She was nicknamed the World's Loneliest Orca because she spent the last 12 years of her life completely alone. Kiska was the last captive orca to be held in Canada as a result of the Canadian Ending the Captivity of Whales and Dolphins Act.

==== Kohana ====
Kohana was a female born at SeaWorld San Diego on 3 May 2002. She was the second orca to be conceived through artificial insemination. Her parents were Takara and Tilikum. On 25 April 2004, Kohana and her mother were moved to SeaWorld Orlando. On 13 February 2006, Kohana was moved to Loro Parque in Spain with three other orcas: Tekoa, Keto, and Skyla. She often floated at the acrylic glass to interact with visitors. She was intelligent and eager, and learned quickly.

On 13 October 2010, Kohana gave birth to her first calf (a male) named Adán, in the parks "Orca Ocean" exhibit, after a four-hour labor. The calf weighed around 150 kilograms (330 lb), and was two meters long (6.5 ft). Kohana's calf was the first orca born in Loro Parque. On 3 August 2012, Kohana gave birth to her second calf (a female) named Victoria (or Vicky). Like her older brother, Victoria was rejected by Kohana. On 16 June 2013, Victoria suddenly died at the age of 10 months. Vicky's cause of death was later revealed to be intestinal problems. Kohana died suddenly on 14 September 2022, due to cardiac malformation, a defect that forms while the calf is in the womb. After her death, Loro Parque has two males, Tekoa and Adán, and one female, Morgan.

==== Kshamenk ====
Kshamenk (pronounced sha-MEN-k) is a male orca that was taken from the wild off the coast of Argentina in 1992. The population he comes from is unknown. He was approximately five years old at the time. Initial reports said that Kshamenk, along with three members of his pod, had stranded and been "rescued" by Mundo Marino. However, it was later revealed that Mundo Marino had "force stranded" the whales by placing a large net between the whales and the shore. When the tide went out, the whales were left stranded on the beach. One was released, one died on the way to the aquarium, one beat themselves to death on the walls of their enclosure, and one, Kshamenk, survived.

When Kshamenk arrived at Mundo Marino he was kept with a female orca, "Belen". They performed in the orca show together for eight years. Kshamenk impregnated Belen in 1998 but the female calf was stillborn 16 months later. Belen died shortly after in February 2000, leaving Kshamenk alone. After a veterinary evaluation in 2006, Kshamenk was considered non-releasable.

In November 2001 Six Flags Worlds of Adventure, located in Aurora, Ohio, filed a request to import Kshamenk with the National Marine Fisheries Service. 35 anti-captivity organizations including the Wild Earth Foundation, Humane Society of the United States, Cetacean Society International, and Earth Island Institute, opposed the transfer of Kshamenk in favor of his rehabilitation and release. In July 2002 the Secretary of the Environment of Argentina and CITES Argentina denied the request of Mundo Marino to export the whale. In Argentina, it is illegal to export native fauna, and as a wild born orca, Kshamenk is a part of the commonwealth.

Kshamenk resided at Mundo Marino. On 14 February 2013, Kshamenk became a father via artificial insemination to Makani, a male calf born to Kasatka at SeaWorld San Diego, and to a female calf named Kamea, born to Takara at SeaWorld San Antonio on 6 December 2013.

He died on 14 December 2025.

==== Kyara ====
Kyara was a female orca, that was born at SeaWorld San Antonio on 19 April 2017. Her mother was Takara and her father Kyuquot, with Kyara's name being a combination of her parents names. Due to SeaWorld ending its orca breeding program, Kyara was the last orca to be born in its parks. On 22 July it was announced that she was showing signs of pneumonia. Because of this, she had been moved to SeaWorld's animal care hospital for treatment. She died on 24 July 2017.

==== Lolita ====
Tokitae (Toh-kih-tie), stage named Lolita (Loh-lee-tuh), was an orca at the Miami Seaquarium. Lolita was one of the two oldest orcas in captivity at the time of her death. She was a member of the southern resident orcas' L Pod. Researchers believed she was possibly the only living offspring of matriarch L25 "Ocean Sun". When she was an estimated three to six years old, Lolita was captured on 8 August 1970, at Penn Cove, Puget Sound, off the coast of Washington. The Penn Cove capture became controversial due to the large number of wild orcas that were taken (seven) and the number of deaths that resulted: four juveniles died, as well as one adult female who drowned when she became tangled in a net while attempting to reach her calf.

When she first arrived at Miami Seaquarium, Lolita was put in the 'Whale Bowl'. Miami Seaquarium had another orca, Hugo, who lived in a different tank, called the 'Celebrity Bowl', which now houses manatees. The two orcas would vocalize to each other, and Hugo was later moved into the Whale Bowl with Lolita. At first, they were aggressive with each other, but then became more compatible with each other and more aggressive towards their trainers. Lolita and Hugo mated several times, and it was reported that Lolita was pregnant from this. However, she never delivered a live offspring. Lolita never saw another orca since Hugo died in 1980. She vocalized in captivity, in the unique calls used only by her pod. When played recordings of her wild family members, she responded. She was a large orca, measuring 20 feet (6.1 m) long and weighing 7,800 pounds (3,500 kg). This made her one of the largest female orcas in captivity. Lolita lived in the Miami Seaquarium's Whale and Dolphin Stadium, where she performed one to two shows daily, and shared her tank with four Pacific White-Sided dolphins. Despite her size, her tank was the smallest orca habitat in the United States, measuring 35 feet wide and 80 feet long. Lolita is the subject of the documentary Lolita: Slave to Entertainment released in 2008. Various groups called for Lolita to be released into the wild.

Whale activists proceeded to sue the U.S. government in federal court in Seattle, claiming that Lolita, captured from Puget Sound waters in 1970, should be accorded the same protection status granted to other Southern Resident orcas in 2005, as members of an endangered species.

In February 2015, the National Oceanic and Atmospheric Administration (NOAA) included Lolita in the endangered Southern Resident pod while noting the inclusion would not affect her residency at the Miami Seaquarium.

In March 2023, the Miami Seaquarium announced that Lolita would be returned to her natal waters, but she fell ill and died on 18 August 2023 in Miami before the planned transfer could occur. Her death was mourned by the Lummi Nation, whose members were anticipating the return of the orca they called Sk'aliCh'elh-tenaut.

==== Moana ====
Moana was a 12-year-old male Icelandic killer whale who lived at Marineland of Antibes in France. He was born on 16 March 2011, tail first, to Wikie in Marineland of Antibes. He was her first calf, the first successful birth of a killer whale via artificial insemination in Europe and the third worldwide. Initially, it was stated that the calf was a girl so they had a naming contest on Facebook and the name "Moana" (Maori for "ocean") won, but a report in July confirmed that she was in fact a he. Marineland confirmed that his name will not be changed. It is also confirmed that Ulises of SeaWorld San Diego is the father. The calf was conceived via artificial insemination. Moana became a big brother when his mother gave birth to Keijo on 20 November 2013.

Moana died due to acute bacterial septicemia on 18 October 2023.

==== Moby Doll II ====
Moby Doll was the second captive orca ever displayed by a public aquarium, and unlike Wanda, the first, he survived in captivity for nearly three months compared to less than two days. Years later, a recording of his calls enabled scientist John Ford to identify Moby Doll as a member of J Pod of the Southern Residents, the population of orcas most damaged by captures.

The 15 foot (4.6m) long juvenile male orca was harpooned by Vancouver Aquarium collectors in 1964 near East Point, Saturna Island in British Columbia. The orca's size indicated he was most likely 5 years old. After not dying as had been planned, the orca was led to Vancouver using the harpoon line like a leash. There he was given improvised accommodation at Burrard Dry Dock. The following day, 18 July, the dock was opened for the general public to watch the novel captive. Subsequently, the public was kept away, however, and Moby Doll was moved to a seapen at Jericho Beach. His health during his captivity was never very good, and he died on 9 October.

This young J Pod orcas death allowed for both the general public and scientists, a great change in their understanding of the previously misunderstood species. Particular scientific impacts were made by examining Moby Doll's brain and sophisticated use of sound.

==== Nakai ====
On 1 September 2001, Nakai was born to Kasatka, with Tilikum being the father. Unlike most orcas, he was born head first. He was the first orca to be conceived through artificial insemination with a successful birth. As of August 2017, he weighed 7,000 pounds (3,200 kg) and was 19 feet (5.8 m) long. He lived at SeaWorld San Diego. As a mature adolescent with nine other whales, including his half brother Makani, his half sister Kalia and his half brother Ikaika, he lived there his entire life. In late September 2012, Nakai sustained a serious injury to his chin. SeaWorld stated that the injury occurred during "contact with the pool's environment". Nakai was one of the few captive males over the age of 10 to not have a collapsed dorsal fin. Other males such as Ikaika and Trua were younger, had shorter fins, and have fully collapsed dorsal fins. Nakai's dorsal fin was nearly 5 feet (1.5 m) tall and was slightly leaning to the left. The right side of his tail fluke was curved under, but the left side had not curved. Nakai died on 4 August 2022, after an infection.

==== Namu ====
Namu was only the third orca captured and displayed in an aquarium exhibit, and was the subject of a film that changed some people's attitudes toward orcas. In June 1965, William Lechkobit found a 22-foot (6.7m) male orca in his floating salmon net that had drifted close to shore near Namu, British Columbia. The orca was sold for $8,000 to Ted Griffin, a Seattle public aquarium owner. Griffin swam and performed with Namu in the Seattle exhibit and Namu survived one year in captivity before dying in his pen on 9 July 1966.

==== Neocia ====
Neocia was born in October 1992, a female calf of Nootka 5 and Kandu 7. Also known as 'Baby October', she was separated from her mother at the age of 3 and kept in a smaller tank at Marineland Canada with three other young orcas. She was often moved because of her aggressive behavior toward the other orcas in an attempt to dominate them. Neocia was impregnated by her own father Kandu; however, this pregnancy miscarried. Neocia died at the age of 12 after losing her appetite and "not acting normally".

==== Nepo ====
Nepo was captured with several other orcas including Corky II on 11 December 1969. He and a capture mate Yaka were sold to a place called Marine World/Africa USA in California. The two orcas joined another female Kianu who had been at the park since 1968. Kianu wanted Nepo to herself and she would attack Yaka whenever the other female was with Nepo. Nepo, who was very close to Yaka, protected her from Kianu's attacks. The aggressive behavior continued, and Kianu was transferred to a park in Japan. Nepo and Yaka starred in the 1977 horror film Orca. Nepo died from pneumonia on 10 July 1980. Yaka stayed by his side as he took his final breaths. When trainers arrived to take Nepo's body away, Yaka refused to leave him, and it took the trainers a while to separate the whales. Nepo was about 15 years old.

==== Nyar ====
Nyar was born at SeaWorld Orlando Florida on New Year's Eve (31 December) 1993. She was born to parents Gudrun and Tilikum. Nyar suffered from many health problems. Sometimes trainers would have to separate Gudrun and Nyar because the mother would try to drown her daughter. They had some bonding moments together. Nyar was not able to perform in shows as she was a very slow learner. She was even put with her father Tilikum sometimes. He was very gentle with her. Nyar died on 1 April 1996. She was 2 years 4 months and 1 day old. The cause of death was Immune System Failure. The name "Nyar" (spelled Nýár in Icelandic) means "New Year".

==== Orky II ====
Orky II was captured in April 1968 off of Pender Harbor, and is well remembered as the father of Orkid and Kayla. He spent many of his years in captivity at Marineland of the Pacific. Corky II accompanied him, and the two were thought to be cousins, as they were both from the same pod. He fathered all seven of Corky II's unsuccessful calves. Orky II was transferred to SeaWorld San Diego California along with Corky II in the year 1986. There, he was soon put to the bottom of the dominancy ladder. Orky II was involved in one trainer incident in 1987, where he accidentally breached on a miscue and landed on a trainer (John Sillick) while the trainer was riding Corky II as a stunt.

While in service to Sea World, Orky II mated with two of their females, Kandu V and Kenau. Kandu V bore her first successful calf, Orkid, three days before he died on 26 September 1988. She was named in his memory: Orky's Kid. About two months later, Kenau also gave birth to her calf, another female who was later named Kayla. Orky II's death was brought on by acute pneumonia and chronic wasting, which meant he lost a lot of weight before he died. His dorsal fin flopped completely over to his right rather than the left. His pectorals were huge and his flukes were curled completely. His enormous size can be seen in his daughter, Orkid, who grew up to be quite a large female. She is Orky II's only living (captive) relative. At one time Orky II was actually called "Snorky". At almost 22 feet long and 11,000 pounds, he was one of the largest whales ever held in any aquarium.

==== Samoa ====
Samoa was a female captured off Iceland in 1983. Samoa was reported to have died due to complications of giving birth. However, her necropsy revealed she had a rare Saksenaea vasiformis fungal infection which likely caused the stillbirth and her death. On 14 March 1992, while held at SeaWorld Texas, Samoa went into premature labour, and died giving birth to a female calf a few hours later. The calf was stillborn. It was the first reported death of a SeaWorld orca while giving birth. The age of Samoa at the time of her death was estimated to be 12–14.

==== Shamu ====
Captured by Ted Griffin in Puget Sound, Washington, United States, in 1965, Shamu was intended to be a companion for the orca Namu in Griffin's Seattle aquarium. Shamu was, however, quickly leased and eventually sold to SeaWorld San Diego. She performed in several SeaWorld shows and eventually died on 23 August 1971. It was later discovered that Shamu was pregnant at the time of her death. The name Shamu has since been used for many different orcas in SeaWorld shows.

==== Skana ====
Initially named Walter the Whale, this orca was taken into captivity during the Yukon Harbor orca capture operation, which was the first planned, deliberate trapping of a large group of orcas. Fifteen southern resident orcas were trapped by Ted Griffin and his Seattle Marine Aquarium party on 15 February 1967, in Yukon Harbor on the west side of Puget Sound. Three orcas died during the capture, and five were transferred to the aquarium, including Walter, Ramu I and Kandu I. The others were released. Walter was believed to be six years old at the time of her capture. She was sold and transferred to the Vancouver Aquarium on 20 March 1967. There she was renamed Skana. She was by herself in Vancouver until the end of 1968, when the recently captured Hyak II arrived. She died on 5 October 1980, at the approximate age of 19 years, from a mycotic infection.

==== Splash ====
Splash was born in 1989 in Marineland in Canada, transferred to SeaWorld San Diego at the age of 3 and died there in 2005. He was a well loved animal. "He was the one that bonded the best with the trainers," said veterinarian Reidarson. Splash was prone to seizures, and at one point had to have the teeth in his lower jaw removed due to a violent seizure injury. Splash was among the park's most sickly animals. "We brought him back from life-threatening illnesses many times," Reidarson recalled. In 1994, Splash smashed face-first into the wall of his tank, ripping a book-sized patch of skin along his jaw that had to be repaired surgically. Splash died of an infection. Ex SeaWorld trainer John Hargrove, who worked closely with Splash, suggested that Splash died so young partly due to consuming large quantities of sand, presumably because of the boredom of captivity.

==== Spooky ====
Spooky was the second calf born to parents Corky II and Orky II at Marineland of the Pacific on Halloween of 1978 (31 October). Unlike most orcas, he was born head first. He earned his name just for the holiday. Spooky was in good health at first, but it was not to last. Due to the circular tank the orcas were kept in, Corky II had trouble nursing her son. Trainers took over and bottle fed Spooky hoping to help him survive. Spooky died 11 days later on 10 November 1978, from pneumonia and colitis. Spooky's breed was 100% Northern Resident orca.

==== Sumar ====
Sumar (14 May 1998 – 7 September 2010) was a male orca born at SeaWorld Orlando in Florida. His mother was Taima and he was her first calf. Just six months after birth, an incident happened when, during a show, his mother attacked him, pushing him against the glass, trying to make him fall. The crowd was evacuated and the show canceled. The trainers tried to move Taima to another tank and finally separated her from her son. Since then, the two of them have been always separated and Kalina and Katina became his surrogate mothers until he was transferred to SeaWorld San Diego in California on 8 March 1999. Afterwards, he spent a few months at now-closed SeaWorld Ohio before being transferred back to the San Diego park.

He was considered very gentle with other orcas and trainers. At the time of his death he was one of three males at the park, and was seen as a possible breeding male in the future; Nakai, the younger male, is still too young to breed, and the older male Ulises seems to have a low sperm count. Sumar was approaching full size for a typical bull orca when he died: his dorsal fin was more and more leaning to its left and his flukes were beginning to curl under. He was about 4.6 m (17 feet) long and weighed around 5,300 pounds (2,400 kg). He was often used for shows in the park. The theme of a June 2010 episode of Cupcake Wars was Sumar's twelfth birthday.

Sumar died at SeaWorld San Diego on Tuesday, 7 September 2010, at the age of 12. Trainers noticed that the whale was not feeling well on Monday, 6 September 2010, which resulted in veterinarians being notified, blood samples drawn, and antibiotics administered. Despite measures taken by Sumar's veterinarian team, Sumar became increasingly ill by Tuesday. He died shortly before 1:45 p.m. (Pacific time). Sumar's death prompted the canceling of the park's orca shows for the day. His death was determined to be as a result of a twisted intestinal tract (intestinal volvulus). He was set to be the next captive breeding bull orca, after his father Tilikum.

==== Taima ====
Taima (pronounced Ty-EE-Ma) (11 July 1989 – 6 June 2010) was a Transient/Icelandic hybrid female orca who lived at SeaWorld Orlando in Florida. Her name purportedly comes from a Native American or Icelandic language, and means "crash of thunder". She was born tail-first around 16:45 EST during a thunderstorm.

Taima was born to mother Gudrun and father Kanduke. Kanduke was a member of the Pacific transient orca community, which meant Taima had transient blood in her. In 1990, Kanduke died at the age of 20 from St. Louis encephalitis. Gudrun gave birth to Taima's half-sister Nyar in 1993. Nyar suffered frequent illness and it was reported that Gudrun tried to drown her during several shows. Trainers believe that this confused Taima, as she witnessed this and thought this was how to raise a calf. She was later reported to have performed this on her own calves Sumar, Tekoa and Malia. Gudrun died in 1996 from stillbirth complications, and Nyar died from an illness a few months later in April.

On 14 May 1998, Taima gave birth to a male calf named Sumar. They were separated when he was about eight months old because of the aggression between them. On one occasion while performing, Taima started biting Sumar, and throwing him out of the pool, onto the trainers' platform. She then slid out herself and started biting him. The show was stopped, and Taima was pulled to the other swimming pool. A few months later Sumar was transferred to SeaWorld San Diego in California.

On 8 November 2000, at 3:47 p.m., Taima gave birth to a male named Tekoa. He began feeding overnight and was estimated to be 7 feet (2.2 m) long and weigh 350 pounds (160 kg). During the birth, Kalina assisted Taima and helped the calf to the surface for its first breath. Tekoa was sent to SeaWorld San Antonio in 2004, and was later sent to Loro Parque in Tenerife in February 2006, where he remains today. After Tekoa's attack, Taima was separated from all other whales except Tilikum, until she gave birth again to her first daughter Malia in 2007, on 12 March. "At birth Malia (Hawaiian for "calm and peaceful") measured about 6 feet and weighed in at around 350 pounds. Her father is Tilikum." Seaworld announced on 18 May 2010, that Taima was pregnant again.

Taima died from complications to a stillborn male calf on 6 June 2010. Preliminary indications suggested that her death was caused by placenta previa, a condition in which the placenta is delivered before the calf.

==== Taku ====
Taku (9 September 1993 – 17 October 2007) was a male orca born at SeaWorld Orlando in Florida. After birth, Taku spent most of his time with his mother Katina or Nyar, his younger half-sister. Three years later, Katina gave birth again to a female, Unna. On 25 August 2002, Katina gave birth to her fifth calf: a male, Ikaika. Unna was later moved to SeaWorld San Antonio in December 2002. Afterwards, Ikaika and Taku bonded to the point where Ikaika swam in mother-calf-position with Taku. On 18 November 2006, Taku was moved to SeaWorld San Antonio whereas Ikaika was moved to Marineland of Canada in Ontario.

Takara soon became pregnant from Taku. On 23 November 2005, around 21:50 EST (4:50 pm), Takara went into labor with her second calf. Her daughter Kohana was at her side. Thirty-two minutes later around 22:22 EST (5:22 pm), Takara gave birth to a male calf (Taku's son/first calf) who was later to be named Trua. Taku sired another calf in 2006 with his mother Katina – Nalani, who was also his sister and the first surviving inbred calf.

Taku died unexpectedly on 17 October 2007, at the age of 14 and was unusually large for his age, weighing over 7,000 pounds (3,200 kg) and at 22 feet (6.7 m) long. Trainers were notified that Taku had been acting differently the Wednesday before his death. A NMFS Marine Mammal Inventory Report lists the cause of death as "severe multifocal interstitial pneumonia"; however, also peer-reviewed sources which have reported, based on necropsy results, the cause of death as West Nile virus contracted via a mosquito bite.

==== Tilikum ====
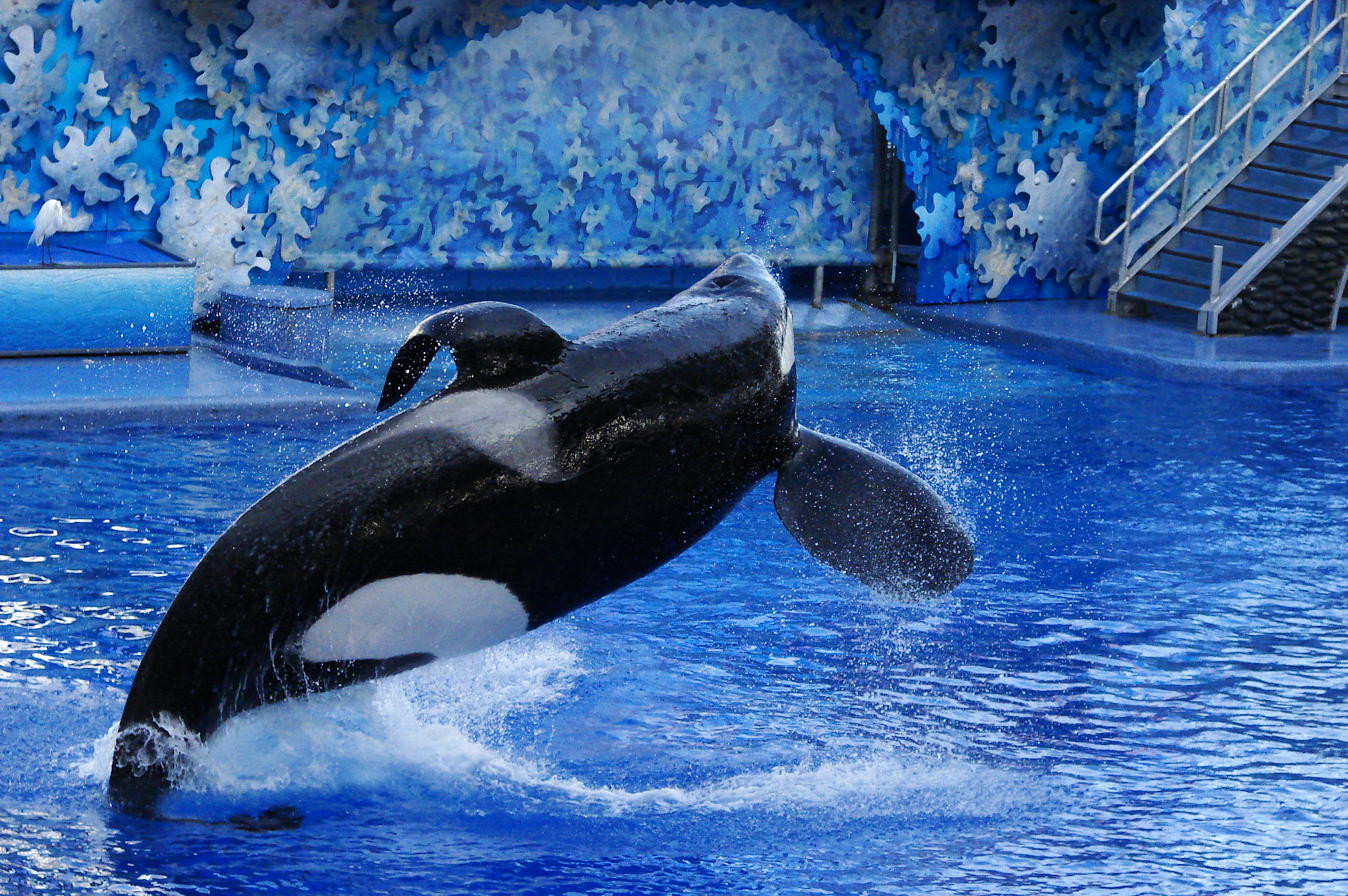
Tilikum at SeaWorld Orlando (2009)

Tilikum (sometimes misspelled Tillikum) (born circa 1981, died 2017) was a bull orca involved in three human deaths while he was in captivity, one at Sealand of the Pacific and two at SeaWorld Orlando. He was captured near Iceland in November 1983 at about two years of age. He was the largest orca in captivity and also the most successful sire in captivity, with 21 offspring, seven of which are still alive.

When he was eight or nine years old, he impregnated both females at Sealand: Haida II and Nootka IV. On February 20, 1991, the three orcas killed trainer Keltie Byrne. Tilikum's first son, Kyuquot, was born to Haida II on 24 December 1991. Tilikum was moved to SeaWorld Orlando, Florida, on 9 January 1992, where nobody was allowed to enter the water with him. Nootka IV gave birth on 4 February 1992, but the calf only lived a month. Sealand of the Pacific closed in 1992.

Following his arrival in Orlando, Tilikum fathered many calves with many different females. In 1999, he began training for artificial insemination, allowing him to sire calves at different parks. On the morning of July 6, 1999, the body of trespasser Daniel P. Dukes was found draped over Tilikum's back, as the orca swam around keeping the body above the water's surface. The medical examiner found that his death was by drowning. On February 24, 2010, Tilikum killed trainer Dawn Brancheau after dragging her into the water.

On 6 January 2017, SeaWorld announced that Tilikum had died early in the morning of bacterial pneumonia.

==== Unna ====
Unna was a female orca. She was born on 27 December 1996, at SeaWorld Orlando. Her parents were Katina (mother) and Tilikum. She was Katina's fourth calf and Tilikum's seventh (fourth successful), and was the second calf to be born to the pair. Unna lived with her mother, father, siblings, and other whales at her birthplace in Orlando for the first six years of her life. In December 2002, Unna was transferred to SeaWorld San Antonio. In late April 2006, Unna gave birth to a stillborn calf. Unna recovered well from her stillbirth. In late Summer 2015, Unna came down with a strain of fungus known as Candida. After several months of intense treatment, Unna died on 21 December 2015, of a systemic bacterial infection.

==== Vigga ====
Vigga (Little Sweetheart) was born in 1977 near Iceland, and brought to Marine World Africa USA Park, then located in Redwood City California, in 1980. Vigga shared her tank at the park with another female orca, Yaka, who had lost her mate Nepo a few months before Vigga was introduced to the park. Yaka and Vigga lived together at Marine World until Yaka died in 1997 at age 32. She made the move with Yaka to the Park's new quarters in Vallejo California in 1986. Vigga was over 16 feet long and weighed 5,000 pounds. Vigga died on Monday, 14 August 2000, at approximately 8 p.m. An abnormal heart pathology resulting in a build-up of fluid in her pericardial sac, and an infection in one lung is the suspected cause of death.

==== Walter ====
At the 1967 Vancouver Boat Show at the PNE (Pacific National Exhibition) grounds, "a star was born by the name of Walter and the attraction helped the show...to an attendance record of more than 100,000."

The Boat Show's producer Bob O'Loughlin had for years "hoped to display a live killer whale at one of his traveling sports shows," but he had failed in several attempts to catch one at Seattle. His hopes were finally fulfilled after the Yukon Harbor capture operation, when Seattle Marine Aquarium owner Ted Griffin trapped 15 Southern Resident orcas, probably all from K Pod, in Yukon Harbor in Puget Sound on 15 February 1967. Griffin had hoped to deliver a rented orca to O'Loughlin for the Boat, Trailer and Sports Show in Portland, Oregon, which opened 17 February. Corralling selected whales out of the 15 held in Yukon Harbor proved to be a long and difficult process, however, and the Portland show closed before Griffin could secure an orca for it, but the traveling show moved to Vancouver, British Columbia, and the rental agreement continued.

Before he had received a whale, "O'Loughlin's three children, ages 6 to 9, [had] decided on a name...Would you believe?—Walter the Whale." At an estimated 16 feet (4.9 m), the orca chosen for the Vancouver Boat Show was the largest and eldest of the five secured at the Seattle Public Aquarium, and the last to arrive, on 4 March. Griffin personally managed the whole rental operation, remaining with Walter throughout the Vancouver Boat Show, which ran from 10 to 19 March. Just outside the PNE Agrodome, a tent was set up over a circular portable tank 34 feet (10 m) across and eight feet (2.4 metres) deep. Following continual phone calls from irate citizens who did not "want Walter to become another Moby Doll or Namu," the SPCA checked the tank and raised concerns over its size, and over the orca's separation from the other members of the pod, but basically accepted the situation.

Griffin was trying to wean all the captured orcas onto dead herring, and only fed Walter twice in a week to keep the orca hungry. Nonetheless, the Southern Resident orca was reluctant to eat the food, and was force fed with a pump.

"Each hour, hundreds of sightseers filed into the tent, where Griffin gave a brief presentation about orcas, assuring listeners that the species was far friendlier than most believed. Visitors could then approach the pool, where the bravest could offer the whale herring and even rub his rubbery skin."

On 16 March, Vancouver's leading radio host Jack Webster broadcast Walter in "the first whale-to-whale telephone call in history." At the other end of the line at the Seattle Marine Aquarium were two younger podmates—Katy and Kandu.

The Vancouver Aquarium did not want to let the rented star leave the city, and bought Walter. Assistant curator Vince Penfold donned a scuba suit and welcomed the orca with lunch underwater, captured in a photograph in the Vancouver Sun. The whale was fed "100 pounds (45 kilograms) of fish, mostly ling cod and herring, in four daily feedings."

Weighing approximately 3,000 pounds (1,400 kilograms) and "just under 15 feet (4.6 metres)" long, this was still an immature orca, whose dorsal fin could not yet indicate gender. In Walter's new tank at the Vancouver Aquarium, Penfold reversed the gender problem he had had with Moby Doll. This time a 'masculine' name had been given to a female whale. The name Walter was not considered fitting, and the aquarium selected for her the name Skana.

==== Wanda ====
The captive orca who was given the name Wanda is famous for being the first known orca to be exhibited alive by an aquarium, preceding Moby Doll by more than two years. Wanda was a mature North Pacific offshore ecotype, as confirmed by much later DNA analysis.

The orca was spotted by boaters alone near Newport Beach, California, on 17 November 1961, and reports reached Marineland of the Pacific. "Marineland officials said the 5,000-pound (2,300 kg), 17-foot (5.2 m) long female might have ventured into Newport harbor Friday because it was ailing," A.P. reported.

The next day, Marineland collectors led by Frank Brocato finally netted her after she had evaded their capture efforts for nine hours, watched by thousands of spectators. In the last stage of the whale's transportation to a tank at Marineland, she slipped out of her sling and smashed head-first into the wall of the tank. Crowds poured into the aquarium on the 19th to see the "monster of the deep", as orcas were characterized.

Brocato recalled the events of the morning of the 20th thus: "But the next day, she went crazy. She started swimming at high speed around the tank, striking her body repeatedly. Finally, she convulsed and died."

Wanda was referred to as "The Newport Specimen" by Marineland in the necropsy report. It found that death was due to pneumonia, and acute gastroenteritis secondary to a massive nematode infestation. Among her many long standing health conditions, excessive tooth wear was not understood. It was not until the discovery of the Offshore type of orca decades later that this condition was linked to their predation on Pacific sleeper sharks.

Wanda revealed that orcas could be a unique, crowd-pulling attraction. Her legacy was the succession of capture attempts made by Marineland of the Pacific, initially off California. Then in September 1962 in Washington waters off the west side of San Juan Island, Brocato lassoed a female salmon-eating southern resident orca. When she and an accompanying male thumped his boat with their flukes, Brocato started shooting from his rifle, killing the female—the first of many southern residents to be killed in capture operations. Her body was towed to Bellingham to be rendered for dog food.

Marineland of the Pacific did not manage to display another orca until 1967, when they acquired a calf who had blundered into a fishing net near Port Hardy. This northern resident orca became the first Orky. But by this time they had been upstaged by competitors, notably SeaWorld.

==== Winston ====
Winston, originally known as Ramu, was captured in the 1970 Penn Cove capture in Washington, and lived in Windsor Safari park and SeaWorld San Diego. He died in 1986. He was the father of the original Baby Shamu, Kalina.

==== Yaka ====
Yaka (Pronounced: Yah-Kah) (1966–1997), was a Pacific Northwest orca. She died on 29 October 1997, after 27 years in captivity. She was approximately 31 years old, the third oldest orca in captivity at the time. The cause of her death was supposedly pneumonia. She came to Marine World Africa USA located in Redwood City California in December 1969 together with male Nepo after being captured off the coast of British Columbia. Nepo and Yaka starred in the 1977 horror film Orca. Nepo died in July 1980, leaving Yaka alone. In November 1980, the Icelandic female orca Vigga became her tank mate. Yaka was 10 years older than Vigga. They made the move together when the park relocated to Vallejo, California, in 1986. Vigga died three years after Yaka in August 2000.

Yaka was a member of the A5 Pod, as is Corky.

== See also ==
- Category:Individual orcas
- List of individual cetaceans
- Captive orca
- Orca attack
- Keiko, the star of the 1993 movie Free Willy
- SeaWorld
- Shamu
