= Kotar (orca) =

Male orca formerly in captivity at SeaWorld San Antonio, Texas

- Species: Killer whale (Orcinus orca)
- Breed: Icelandic
- Sex: Male
- Born: c. 1978
- Died: 1 April 1995; SeaWorld San Antonio, Texas
- Years active: 1978-1995
- Known for: Being the youngest surviving captive killer whale
- Offspring: 6
- Weight: 9,000 lb (4,100 kg)

Kotar was a male killer whale captured off the southeast coast of Iceland in October 1978. At the time of his capture, he was only 210 cm long and he is believed to be the youngest killer whale taken into captivity from the wild that survived.

Kotar was bought by SeaWorld and sent to SeaWorld San Diego where he spent his first couple of years of captive life. He originally stayed at Shamu Stadium but was later moved to SeaWorld's petting pool.

At some point in the 1980s, Kotar was transferred to SeaWorld Orlando. He played "Shamu" in JAWS 3-D in 1983. In 1987, Kanduke, a male killer whale bought by SeaWorld from Marineland of Canada, arrived in Orlando. Kotar and Kanduke did not get along and often fought, the aggression eventually getting serious. In 1988, following an incident in which Kotar bit Kanduke's penis and caused an infection and show cancellations, Kotar was moved to the newly opened SeaWorld San Antonio where he remained for the rest of his life.

Kotar died on 1 April 1995 after an illness that was attempted to be treated for 2 weeks. During his time in captivity, Kotar sired six offspring; Takara, Keet, and Keto as well as three others that resulted in early deaths or stillbirths.

== See also ==
- List of individual cetaceans
