= Shanghai Haichang Ocean Park =

Theme park in Shanghai, China

- Previously known as Shanghai Haichang Polar Ocean World
- Interactive map of Shanghai Haichang Ocean Park
- Location: Nanhui New City, Pudong, Shanghai, China
- Coordinates: 30.915579°N 121.901602°E
- Opened: November 16, 2018
- Owner: Haichang Ocean Park Holdings
- Operated by: Haichang Ocean Park Holdings
- Theme: Marine
- Slogan: More Than a Theme Park Because We Care
- Operating season: Year-round
- Area: 29.7 hectares (73 acres)

Attractions
- Total: 9
- Roller coasters: 2
- Water rides: 1
- Website: www.haichangoceanpark.com/shanghai

Shanghai Haichang Ocean Park (Chinese: 上海海昌海洋公园) is a theme park owned by Haichang Ocean Park Holdings and located in the Chinese municipality of Shanghai. The grand opening of the park took place on November 16, 2018. The park is Haichang Ocean Park Holdings' second theme park in the country. Shanghai Haichang Ocean Park is themed to the ocean and its marine life and features rides, animal exhibits, an onsite hotel, and shows. Half of the park is themed to a tundra environment, which includes a conspicuous snow-covered mountain, while the other half of the park is themed to a tropical environment, which includes an equally conspicuous volcano. The two halves are connected by a gondola lift and two large pedestrian bridges that cross a canal. The theme park's flagship attractions include a launch roller coaster, a river rapids ride, and a killer whale show and exhibit.

== History ==
Shanghai Haichang Ocean Park has been in development since at least 2012. When plans for the theme park were initially revealed, the park was originally going to be located on a long, narrow area of land on the east side of Dishui Lake. In the early planning stages, securing the land and government permissions was so critical to Haichang that they hired three different entertainment design firms, Romero VanRell Jeng and Associates, FORREC, and Legacy Entertainment, at full-fare to design completely different parks, and then let the local officials decide which design they preferred. Eventually Legacy Entertainment's design was selected, and then that design was later adapted to fit the park's new location on the west side of Dishui Lake. The theme park's groundbreaking ceremony took place on March 29, 2015. Trial operations of the theme park began on October 1, 2018.
