= Yukon Harbor orca capture operation =

First multiple-orca capture

The Yukon Harbor orca capture operation was the first planned, deliberate trapping of a large group of orcas (killer whales). 15 southern resident orcas were trapped by Ted Griffin and his Seattle Public Aquarium party on February 15, 1967, in Yukon Harbor on the west side of Puget Sound, in the northwest United States. The first four orcas that had been taken into captivity had been captured singly, and mostly opportunistically. Those four were named Wanda, Moby Doll, Namu, and Shamu—who was then the only surviving one. Through them, public interest in orcas had escalated.

The Yukon Harbor operation initiated the "peak cropping years" of the orca capture era in the Salish Sea, when large numbers of resident orcas were captured for sale. This occurred just at the time when the global whaling industry was beginning to become problematic in its viability and in social history.

By 1967, there had been a score of attempts to capture orcas by various organizations. All of the deliberate attempts had failed, except for Ted Griffin's capture of Shamu. Many of the capture attempts had resulted in the deaths of orcas. Griffin's project was born of experiential knowledge combined with the geographical advantages of Puget Sound. His wealth of experiences led to preparations of unique equipment and methods in order to realize the deliberate capture of multiple orcas. Nonetheless, the operation would be plagued with difficulties and vicissitudes. In particular, herding and corralling the orcas (akin to dolphin drive hunting) for transfer from Yukon Harbor, where 15 were trapped, to the aquarium in Seattle proved to be a long and dramatic, 17-day process, reported daily in The Seattle Times.

Five young southern resident orcas were taken into captivity. Three of them were infants, 11-foot (3.4 m) or less. The names eventually given to the five were Kilroy, Ramu, Katy, Kandu, and Walter the Whale—later renamed Skana. The death toll was 3 orcas, Griffin's highest besides that of the 1970 Penn Cove operation. Two orcas managed to escape from the capture nets. They were thought to be the mothers of lost calves. The remaining five orcas were released at the end of the operation.

== 1967 historical background ==
=== Legal situation of orcas ===
In the US, the Endangered Species Preservation Act of 1966 resulted in the listing for preservation of "once-vilified predators such as the timber wolf and grizzly bear," and some marine mammal species. The fate of cetaceans, however, was left to the IWC (International Whaling Commission). To be sure, as a species the orca was not endangered. It was also considered a dangerous pest. It preyed on fish, seals, and whales, all of which were seen as valuable resources for humans.

=== Whaling in the Pacific Northwest ===
"Whale stocks were crashing," leading to "the IWC's banning of the harvest of humpbacks and blue whales in the North Pacific." Whaling in British Columbia waters was becoming unprofitable because of low whale numbers, and competition from other products in the oil, meal, and meat markets. The province's only whaling company, the Western Canada Whaling Co., "was half owned by B.C. Packers Ltd. and half by Taiyo Gyogyo Fishing Co. of Japan, the largest fishing company in the world" (since incorporated into Clover Leaf Seafoods and Maruha Nichiro respectively). The Western Canada Whaling Company operated a shore whaling station at Coal Harbour on northwest Vancouver Island. Its fleet's range was limited to 200 miles (320 kilometres), because it did not have the factory ships that allowed the Russian and Japanese fleets to operate far from their base, going "wherever the schools are most numerous." The B.C. whaling fleet's "total catch of all species" was 651 in 1966, and 496 in 1967. "The sei catch showed the heaviest decline" that year, from 350 to 89. The other species caught were 304 sperm and 103 fin whales. The Coal Harbour whaling station closed after this "disappointing harvest."

Harming whales was beginning to become more controversial in North America. Just a week before the Yukon Harbor capture operation, the death in Newfoundland of a trapped fin whale called Moby Joe was lamented by Farley Mowat. The incident would be the subject of his 1972 book A Whale for the Killing, which would be inspirational for Greenpeace activist and orca scientist Paul Spong, whose life would be deeply affected by his relationship with Skana, who was captured in Yukon Harbor.

=== Namu's legacy ===
Following the death of Namu, Shamu was the only remaining orca in captivity. Namu had made Ted Griffin a local hero, as exemplified in a summary in The Seattle Times: "Namu lived in captivity about a year, after being towed from the British Columbia wilderness in a daring expedition that caught the attention of the world. Griffin managed to tame Namu to the point where the big killer whale permitted his owner to ride him bareback and performed several tricks. Shortly before he died, Namu was featured in a Hollywood motion picture."

He had also put Griffin into debt. Griffin expressed mixed feelings when Namu died, saying he wished Namu had succeeded in a supposed "break for freedom" which had resulted in his death. The necropsy actually evidenced that he had been ill with an "acute bacterial infection, likely contracted from sewage runoff in Elliott Bay" where Griffin had moved him.

Nevertheless, thousands of local fans wanted Griffin to get another orca. Aquariums all over the world also wanted Griffin to capture an orca for them. His most immediate orders would come from SeaWorld San Diego, and Portland, Oregon Boat Show producer Bob O'Loughlin, who had tried to capture orcas at Seattle even before the captivity of Moby Doll in 1964.

=== Namu, Inc. ===
Demand for captive orcas was not lacking, but supply was very problematic. Out of a score of deliberate capture attempts up until then, only the one which had caught Shamu had been successful. And a regular hazard of attempting to collect for aquariums was the death of animals. It appeared, however, that if anyone could catch an orca, it was Ted Griffin. "Namu, Inc., initially founded to control marketing and merchandising for the world's only captive orca, became the whale-catching arm of the Seattle Marine Aquarium" which he owned.

== Griffin's preparations ==
=== The project ===
In the late summer of 1966, Ted Griffin was planning not only to find a replacement for Namu at his Seattle Public Aquarium, but also to fill orders from other enterprises. Few, if any, other humans had spent as much time observing and obsessively chasing orcas. Many years of experience had left him painfully aware of how difficult it was to catch an orca alive. It had been done deliberately only once—by himself.

Yet during the fall salmon run when Tacoma waters "teemed with the huge mammals" which "romped to the delight of shoreline spectators," Griffin himself did not appear to be interested in catching an orca at that time. To be sure, Tacoma Park District officials, who had investigated "the feasibility of a killer whale for Tacoma," decided that "pens and whale food are too expensive." Seattle Marine Aquarium director Don Goldsberry, Griffin's assistant and a Tacoma native, said that the aquarium preferred to "wait until the spring to avoid the high cost of winter upkeep," even though during the fall salmon run was "the best time of year to hunt" the mammals. He also hinted at the aquarium's planning, saying, "We don't have enough equipment. Most of our gear soon will be coming in from the East."

=== Equipment ===
The essential issue was always that for the operation to be successful, the orcas had to stay alive. It was not like whaling, hunting, or fishing. Intriguingly, the orcas were spooked by nets, in spite of their agility. Because they had to surface to breathe, they drowned if they became entangled underwater.

The plan was to surround them with an unusually large seine net, to trap them while avoiding entanglement. The net would not be cinched together like a normal purse seine. Instead, it would be anchored to the seafloor in a shallow bay. Furthermore, the light nylon mesh was supposed to tear if the orcas collided with it. An ongoing problem was the big tides and heavy currents of the Puget Sound area, which could cause the netting to shift. At least three times previously, that had led to escapes.

Keeping track of the orcas when chasing them was another difficulty. They could dive into underwater darkness and give no indication of their underwater direction. The solution to this came via a Greener harpoon gun.

This rifle was suggested and lent to Ted Griffin by the Marine Mammal Biological Laboratory, a little-known section of the United States Fish and Wildlife Service. "Located on the Sand Point Naval Air Station near the University of Washington, the lab was the only facility in North America devoted exclusively to the study of marine mammals. But its research focused on their commercial use. The lab’s primary mandate was managing the northern fur seal population, which migrated annually to the rookeries on Alaska’s Pribilof Islands...Funded largely by the seal hunt, the lab’s researchers supervised the annual slaughter of nearly eighty thousand animals, whose hides and meat came to Seattle for processing."

Their theory behind Griffin's potential use of the Greener rifle was that the harpoon it fired would be too light to penetrate the blubber of a large orca and cause serious injury. Griffin would use it to attach a line with buoys to a orca. As the local orcas always stuck together in large pods, the buoys trailing behind a harpooned individual would make it possible to track a number of them.

Crucially, to enable Griffin to spot and fire upon the fast and elusive animals, he had aircraft available "supplied by Lake Union Air Service and Seattle Helicopter Airways."

=== Location ===
Puget Sound, with all its islands, narrow waterways and shallow bays, was ideal for spotting and trapping orcas, which came as far south as Olympia. To initially find the orcas, Ted Griffin created a spotting network and appealed to the public for information, saying that the aquarium would accept collect calls with sightings.

== Southern residents hunted ==
At the start of 1967, Ted Griffin, director of the Seattle Public Aquarium on Pier 56, began actively searching for a replacement for Namu, who had died the previous July. He said, "The hottest area for killer whales at present would be the channel between Possession Point [on Whidbey Island] and Point No Point," and he asked people around Puget Sound to phone him collect when they sighted them. Throughout January, he "received dozens of phone calls" about a group of southern resident orcas there "living on the big blackmouth."

On Saturday January 28, a call to The Seattle Times from a woman who spotted the orcas between nearby West Seattle and Vashon Island set off a hunt by Griffin's party. They picked up the orcas off Point Robinson in the afternoon, and followed them all night, but on the Sunday, in a winter storm with 70 mile-an-hour (113 kph) gusts, they lost them. On Monday morning, "they received a call from the Fauntleroy Ferry Terminal that the whales had been sighted again." They "went after them," then definitively lost them near the Agate Pass Bridge.

== Yukon Harbor capture ==
=== The trap ===
Ted Griffin had lost track of the southern resident orcas in January, but on February 14 he was notified "by the Coast Guard that killer whales had been spotted at Port Angeles, Washington, headed" towards Puget Sound. When they were sighted there on the 15th, he boarded a helicopter, carrying the Greener harpoon rifle with buoys attached to the line.

"Griffin's opportunity came when a female and her calf surfaced beneath the helicopter, prompting an adult male to push them back underwater. 'Did you see that?' Griffin yelled to the pilot. 'He's protecting them!' The aquarium owner then fired his harpoon into the bull's right flank." In the following hours, his team on the water "used the three trailing buoys to track the pod."

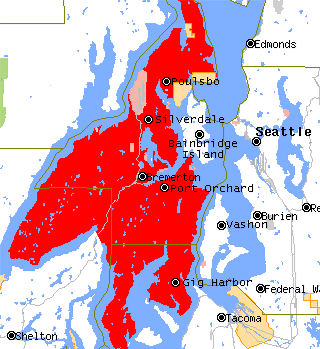
Yukon Harbor is due south of Bainbridge Island, and off the Kitsap Peninsula (shown in red)

While north bound along the east coast of Vashon Island, the 30 or more orcas split into three groups. In a sheltered cove named Yukon Harbor on the Kitsap Peninsula south of Bainbridge Island, over depths ranging from 42 to 84 feet (13 to 26 metres), the fishing vessel Chinook laid out its 3,960-foot-long (1,210 m) modified seine net. According to a later count, 15 orcas were in a group that was pressed toward it using two boats while the seine was rapidly closed in a circle, trapping the orcas. (15 was the final count, whereas early estimates were lower, due to the orcas not all being at the surface at the same time.) The 15 trapped orcas were probably all from K Pod, an ongoing social unit of the southern residents. The page 1 photograph in The Seattle Times shows five of the southern residents surrounded by the net.

This was the first time orcas had been trapped in this manner. From their echolocation, they would have known that the net surrounding them underwater was a dangerous physical barrier. And although it did not appear above the surface when they spy-hopped, they apparently judged they could not safely jump over the top of nets. Instead they would try to dive under them, or find a passage through them.

A great danger to the whales' health came when a navy destroyer passed emitting powerful sonar sounds. They shrieked and breached repeatedly during the disturbance.

=== Orcas being herded ===
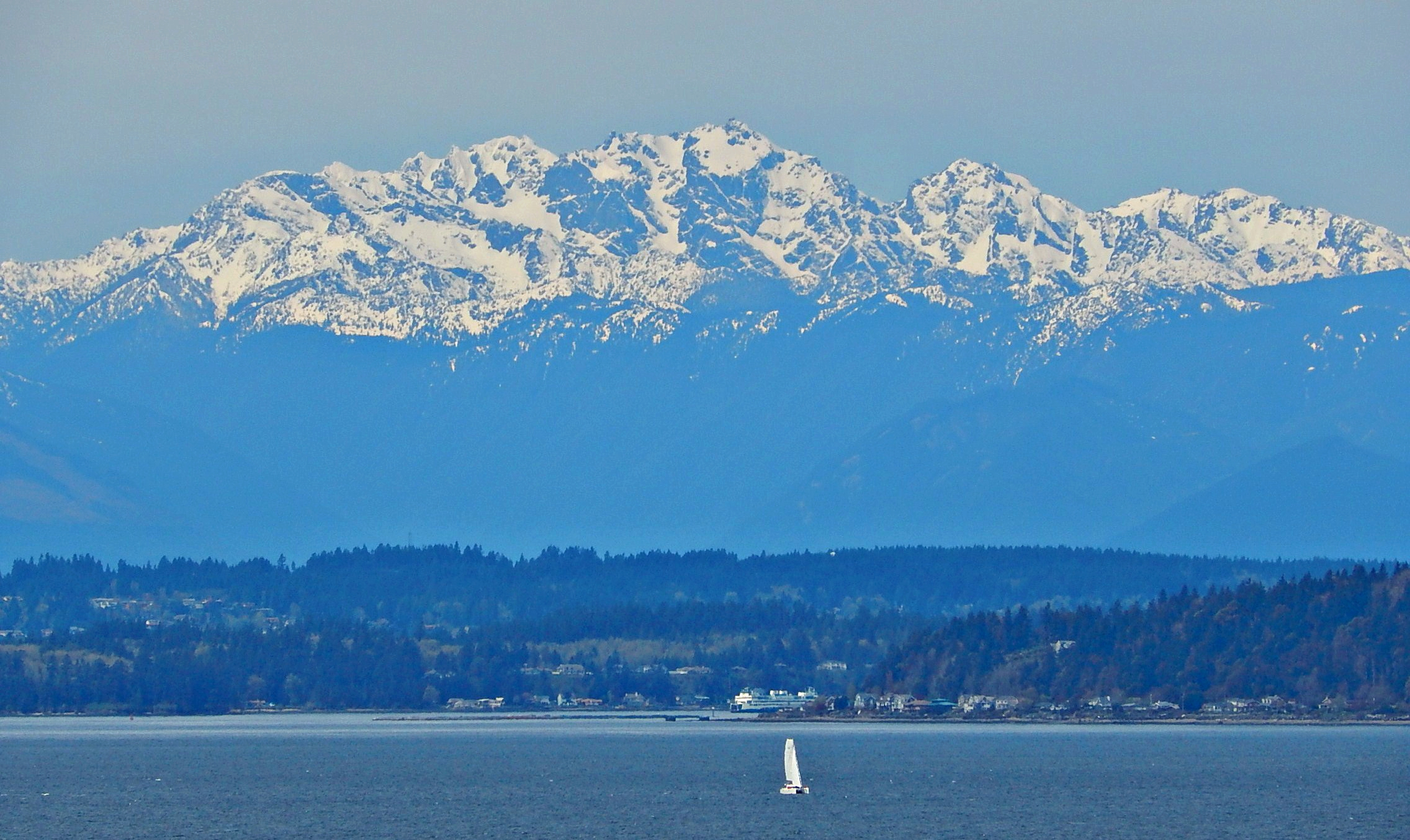
Western shores of Puget Sound viewed from West Seattle

February 15 had ended with a large number of southern resident orcas trapped inside a seine net, but "no one had ever attempted to sort and separate killer whales." Also, "while locals would pay to see a killer whale perform at Pier 56, they were less eager to witness a capture right in front of them." Many difficult days followed, as Ted Griffin and his party sought to corral the right orcas into smaller holding pens. "In the past several killer whales [had] been lost during this transfer." Griffin's chief assistant Don Goldsberry explained that they were targeting "whales between 13 and 16 feet (4.0 and 4.9 metres) because those are the ideal size for training or working with for scientific purposes." To the surprise of the Seattle Times reporter, "In a strange saga of the sea, Seattle's modern-day Ahab" was going to throw the big ones back, including a reportedly 30-foot (9.1-metre) bull. The Seattle Times took an especial interest in the problems of this phase of the capture operation, publishing daily reports.

Griffin's first goal was to deliver an orca to the Portland Boat Show at the Portland Memorial Coliseum, which opened February 17. Bob O'Loughlin, who was producing the show, had been building a tank for the orca. The first attempt to drive selected orcas into a smaller, 80-by-80-foot (24-by-24-metre) holding pen failed however when they broke through the leader net being used to tighten their space.

Griffin's team pieced together a new net using Navy surplus steel netting manufactured during the Second World War to seal off harbors from enemy submarines. The pen used to hold Namu had also utilized this steel netting. The new net was 1,200 feet (370 metres) long and 50–60 feet (15–18 metres) deep. The orcas "found their world even more restricted" on February 19 when Griffin's divers deployed the steel net within the 3,960-foot (1,210-metre) seine net, and corraled the orcas into the smaller net.

While the Portland Boat Show was still waiting for one of the orcas, Bob O'Loughlin's children decided on the name to be given to the orca—"Walter the Whale."

Six or seven orcas swam into the 80-by-80-foot (24-by-24-metre) holding pen on the 21st, but got out again, leaving the gate at its mouth needing repairs.

February 22 brought a night-time drama. Two orcas had been trapped in the holding pen, which was towed closer to shore in order to transfer one to a tank truck for the trip to Portland. The Seattle Times described the incident on page one: "A 13-foot (4.0-metre) female...got a fin caught in the net...then, in a fight to get loose, wrapped herself completely in the net. The whale drowned shortly before midnight under about six feet (1.8 metres) of water." "As Griffin attempted to free the whale wrapped in the net under water, the second began darting around and also got caught in the net, Griffin said," but she managed to escape. Rather than fleeing, she immediately returned rapidly to the other orcas, and began "swimming around the outside of the net." The free orca was photographed there the following day, "squeaking" at the orcas trapped within the submarine net. She had seen a young relative, possibly her own child, die. The dead orca was turned over to the Marine Mammal Biological Laboratory of the United States Fish and Wildlife Service for studies before being rendered.

After the orcas remained trapped in Yukon Harbor for a week, Griffin began feeding the pod 200 pounds (91 kilograms) of salmon daily.

A controversy characteristic of the times erupted around the chairman of the University of Washington pharmacology department over his suggestion that LSD experiments could be conducted on the orcas, as a comparison with those on other dolphin species and elephants, but there is no evidence they took place.

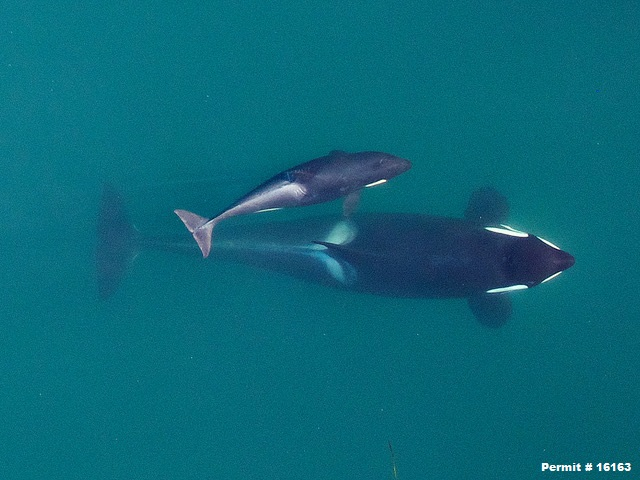
A southern resident mother with her small calf (IDs: J16 'Slick' and J50 'Scarlet')

After repairing the holding pen again, Griffin and his assistants finally, on the 24th, nine days after the start of the operation, secured their first captive, but not without further incident. This orca, transferred across Puget Sound aboard the seiner Chinook to Griffin's Pier 56 aquarium in Seattle, was "a nine-foot (2.7-metre) suckling calf," estimated to be "seven to eight months old." "The young whale's mother, a 16-footer (4.9 meters long), got tangled in Griffin's holding pen during the capture attempt. She was cut loose and released." Rather than fleeing, she joined the other free orca still swimming around the outside of the submarine net.

By this time, Griffin had concluded that "his plans to provide a rental whale for the Portland Boat, Sports and Trailer Show" were dead.

A second orca, a 13-foot (4.0-metre) male, was taken to the Seattle Public Aquarium on the 25th.

These two orcas would be sold to San Diego's SeaWorld and named Kilroy (who was the calf) and Ramu.

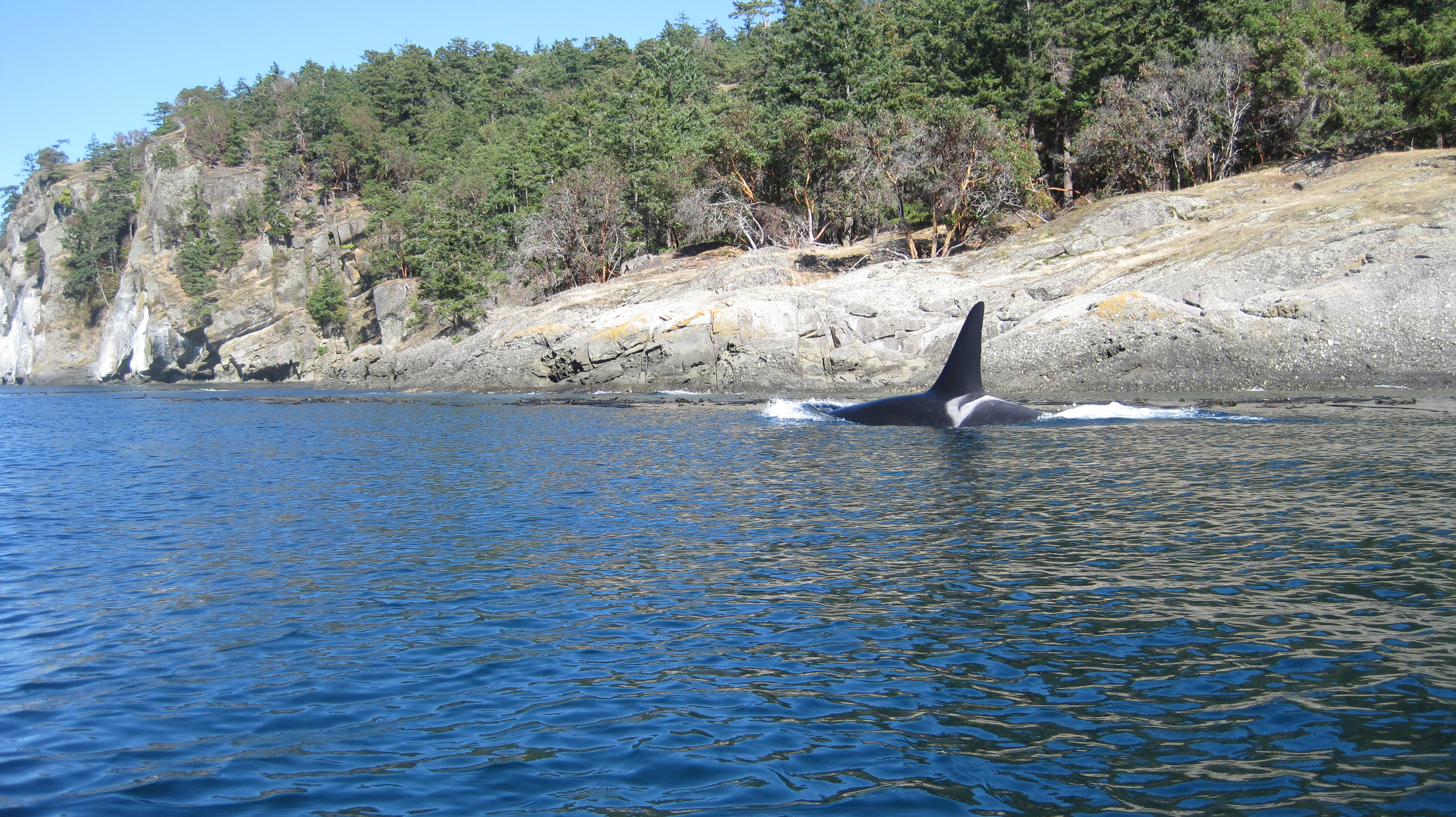
A young adult male of the Southern Resident community (ID L79 'Skana') in the San Juan Islands

All was still not going well for the aquarium owner, however. On the 28th, Griffin had to report the death of his most spectacular captives—"one of whom was the harpooned bull." "He packed the Greener harpoon rifle away, never to use it again." The two "very large" males "became entangled [on the 27th] in the net at depths of 60 to 70 feet (18 to 21 metres) and drowned." It appeared the two bulls had been trying to find a way under the steel submarine net. "Their bodies were turned over to the Marine Mammal Biological Laboratory for autopsies and study, Griffin reported."

"Protests grew when photos emerged of one of the dead whales hanging from the boom of the Marine Mammal Biological Laboratory's research vessel." The aquarium lost some of the good-will that had been generated by Namu. Griffin voiced several counter arguments to answer his critics. First, he admitted he did not have all the answers for the innovative business of collecting orcas humanely. Griffin said that "many whales are killed for scientific research without public knowledge." Then he said that in commercial fishing, "one set of a tuna net can kill hundreds of porpoises." Moreover, the International Whaling Commission, which permitted the ""controlled" slaughtering of whales for commercial activities," had no objection to Griffin's activities. The Sunday, March 5 Seattle Times carried a photograph of boys picketing Pier 56 on page 3. One of their signs read, "Let the whales live free." The nine boys were all from Worth McClure Junior High School.

March 2 and 3, aquarium staff secured two more orcas for Pier 56, taking the total photographed there to four. Griffin described their arrival, "The whales were really excited...screaming and hollering back and forth before the two new ones were even lowered into the tank. Then they started playing follow-the-leader." The two additions were "females nine and 11 feet long." (2.7 and 3.4 meters) These two were later given the names Katy and Kandu.

Five of the remaining six orcas trapped in Yukon Harbor were released March 4 after 17 days inside the net. The final orca, named Walter the Whale then later Skana, was taken to the aquarium, making five in the tank, and "ending the whaling expedition," in the words of The Seattle Times.

=== Effect on K Pod ===
The Yukon Harbor capture roughly halved the number of orcas in K Pod in one capture event, making it possibly the most socially damaging of all the southern resident captures, as well as the second-largest. How many of the other southern residents lost in the 1965–1973 captures were from K Pod is unclear. Four newly born K Pod calves survived in the years following the Yukon Harbor capture along with eight older orcas, making a total of 12 K Pod orcas alive in 1976.
