= Shamu (disambiguation) =

Shamu may refer to:

- Shamu, the first orca (killer whale) to survive more than 13 months in captivity
- Shamu (Meitei culture), the elephants in Meitei civilization
- Shamu (SeaWorld show), the SeaWorld (U.S.) killer whale shows named for SeaWorld's first orca
- Shammu (born 1992), Indian film actress and model
- Webster Shamu (born 1945), Zimbabwean politician, currently serving as Minister of Publicity and Information
- Google Nexus 6, an Android device with the codename Shamu

== See also ==
- Shamoo (disambiguation)
- Shamus (disambiguation)
- Shamu Express, a steel roller coaster at SeaWorld Orlando
- Shamu Salavi, a village in West Azerbaijan Province, Iran.
