= Shamoo =

Shamoo may refer to:

- Adil Shamoo (born 1941), Assyrian-American biochemist
- Shammu (born 1992), Indian actress
- Shamu, one of the first orcas (killer whales) captured and displayed for the public
- Shamu (SeaWorld show), a series of orca shows produced at SeaWorld parks

== See also ==
- Shamus (disambiguation)
