= Moby Doll's impact in scientific research =

Orca's historic scientific impact

Moby Doll, who in 1964 in British Columbia became the second ever captive orca, was the first orca (killer whale) to be studied scientifically at close quarters alive.

Ken Balcomb, the founder of the Center for Whale Research, became one of the main researchers on Moby Doll's population, the southern resident orcas. He recalled that at the time of Moby Doll's captivity, "Whale research was done postmortem." It was "the shoot-and-dissect school of biology." The Marine Mammal Biological Laboratory in Seattle was hunting and killing orcas for its research. Moby Doll began the transformation of the species' image, followed by the next few captive orcas. They initiated "an immense amount of science," Balcomb reflected.

== Sounds ==
Orca sounds had been recorded five times in the years 1956-1961, but their production had never been scientifically studied before Moby Doll's captivity.

=== First recordings, 17 July 1964 ===
Using hydrophones, scientists began recording Moby Doll's vocalizations immediately he was brought to Vancouver, British Columbia by his captors, the Vancouver Aquarium. He talked "almost non-stop," as is usual for his type of orca (southern resident). The scientists listening to Moby Doll found that in the busy port "at the sound of approaching vessels the voice registers signs of panic, but this dies away as the vessel moves on." The day after arriving at Burrard Dry Dock, the juvenile orca made long-distance pulsed calls answered by an orca two miles away. University of British Columbia (UBC) researcher Harold Fisher said, "The captive became very excited and sent out louder, rapid chatter sound when it heard the calls from outside."

A tape of Moby Doll kept by Fisher would years later have great significance for the pivotal orca scientist John Ford (see below).

=== Schevill and Watkins ===
Schevill and Watkins' pioneering study of Moby Doll created the fundamental basis for understanding orca sounds.

William E. Schevill (1906-1994) was a paleontologist who first heard the underwater sounds of whales while working for the US Navy during World War II, in the fight against U-boats. He was inspired to become a cetologist and leading pioneer in the study of whale sounds, working at the Woods Hole Oceanographic Institution. The orca Moby Doll represented the 21st species of cetacean that he studied.

In August 1964, he traveled from Woods Hole to Vancouver with his associate William A. Watkins to study Moby Doll for two days. They carried with them a hydrophone and their portable custom "Rowboat Recorder".

In their scientific paper, Schevill and Watkins wrote that Moby Doll's seapen at Jericho Beach (where he had been moved) proved to be an exceptionally good, quiet site for their study. They did not have to deal with noisy pumps and noisy echoes coming from the walls of a tank, as in some previous studies of cetaceans, and the location had very little traffic of any kind, especially at night, when Moby Doll was most vocal and they did their most crucial work.

==== Echolocation clicks ====
Part of Schevill's research involved discoveries about animal echolocation. Following Donald Griffin's pioneering work with bats, Schevill was the first to describe echolocation in whales, in his 1956 paper, Evidence for echolocation by cetaceans.

In captivity, Moby Doll did not produce echolocation clicks in daylight. In the dark, when he could not rely on eyesight, the scientists moved the hydrophone around as an obstacle in the water to test the orca. They found that without exceptions he would crash into the hydrophone when not producing clicks if it was in a new spot; and avoid it when either he was clicking, or when it was placed in a repeated spot that he could remember. Through this experiment, Moby Doll was the first to give proof of the use of echolocation by orcas.

Furthermore, by comparing Moby Doll's orientation with the sound characteristics of the click recordings, the scientists demonstrated the sharp, directional nature of his echolocation, giving support to Kenneth Norris's new hypothesis that the fatty melon of a delphinid might function as an acoustic lens.

Compared to those recorded of other delphinids, the orca's clicks were characteristically produced at a slower rate: either at a steady 2 to 6 per second, or in short, slow bursts separated by a few seconds. The bursts were of 10-15 clicks, starting at a rate of 18 per second, and slowing to 6 per second, with the fundamental (resonant) frequency falling from 500 cps (Hz) to 350 cps.

The duration of a click was between 10 and 25 milliseconds. These clicks were narrower-band and lower-frequency than those of other delphinids.

==== Calls ====
Schevill and Watkins divided Moby Doll's sounds into two types. Apart from echolocation clicks, they labelled the other type as "screams", which was how they characterized the pulsed sounds they analyzed. Moby Doll never produced the "whistle-like squeal" of other delphinids. Rather, these "screams" were produced in the same way as echolocation, but in pulses of clicks at a much faster repetition-rate, with the strong harmonic structure masking the individuality of the clicks. Indeed, some pulses developed out of slow clicking that accelerated into a "scream", and some "screams" decelerated into slow clicking. Moreover, whereas other dolphins could produce clicks and whistles concurrently, Moby Doll never produced clicks and "screams" simultaneously, which was supporting evidence that both of his types of sound were produced by the same mechanism. (In later research, however, John Ford did detect some whistling to be a minor component of southern resident orca vocalizations, "whereas whistles are the primary social vocalization among the majority of Delphinidae species.")

The scientists noted that there was much variation in their recordings, but certain patterns were general. The pulses had a "strident" quality due to their harmonic structure, with many strong harmonics, and they were much louder than the echolocation. The orca often hit two preferred notes, one at 500 cps (Hz), the other at 2,000 cps; a call often consisted of sliding shifts between these two frequencies. "The subtleties of beginnings and endings of screams could be lost quickly at a distance because of their relatively low amplitude," they wrote.

The duration of the pulses was 0.1 to 3.0 seconds, with 0.65 as an average. Moby Doll called in bouts of 3-5 minutes. Beginning with about one second of separation between calls, he gradually lengthened the separation to a period of quiet of 15 to 30 seconds between calls, as if listening.

Schevill and Watkins wrote, "When our captive screamed, it was apparently trying to communicate (stimulated by outside disturbance, usually a passing boat)." In their short stay in Vancouver from August 16 to 18, Schevill and Watkins did not record the presence of any other orcas in the vicinity, but there were exchanges of calls with other orcas reported at other times, notably when he first arrived in Vancouver.

=== John Ford and dialects ===
Moby Doll set the course of John Ford's scientific career. As a nine-year-old boy, he had seen Moby Doll at Burrard Dry Dock during his one day on display. Later, he worked for the Vancouver Aquarium. He studied whale sounds when he was an undergrad.

At UBC, he heard his professor H.D. Fisher's tape of Moby Doll, and "was really struck at the sounds that were so strident and harsh and metallic in quality. They really are unusual sounds and a little bit sad in a way," he recalled recently.

In 1978, as Ford was beginning his description of orca dialects, he made his first recording of southern resident orcas. He remembered a repetitive call made by Moby Doll that matched a repetitive call being made by these living orcas. Through it, he was able to identify that J Pod had been Moby Doll's pod, which passed this pod-specific discrete call from generation to generation. Moreover, this was evidence that these orcas had an animal culture, because their calls were learnt.

== Sleep ==
Moby Doll was under 24-hour guard; the guards observed that Moby Doll kept swimming around his pen, always in a counterclockwise direction, without ever stopping to sleep. The fact that Moby Doll never rested surprised the Vancouver Aquarium's director Murray Newman, and Patrick McGeer. In their scientific paper, they wrote, "In contrast to this, the whales [orcas] in Johnstone Strait were seen occasionally resting at the surface for brief periods.” In Moby Doll's case, “the low salinity and concomitant low buoyancy at the enclosure may have necessitated constant movement." Regardless, the scientists "strongly suspected from this that killer whales do not experience deep sleep."

== Hydration ==
Analysis of the urine did not find high sodium and potassium values, building evidence for "the notion that whales obtain their water from food and metabolism and do not drink seawater," wrote Newman and McGeer.

== Necropsy ==
The findings of the necropsy were published in Murray Newman and Patrick McGeer's scientific paper, The Capture and Care of a Killer Whale, Orcinus orca, in British Columbia.

=== Brain ===
Subsequent to Moby Doll's necropsy, Newman and McGeer wrote, "The most striking organ was the brain. It weighed 6450 g., a remarkable size for the animal." (For comparison, a human brain weighs 1350 grams on average.)

McGeer said this brain gave evidence of "what researchers have long suspected—killer whales depend more on sound and balance for navigating than they do on sight. It was a huge auditory nerve and a very large cortex. The optic nerve was smaller than the auditory nerve, just the reverse of humans who depend more on sight than on other senses." When the juvenile orca's brain was given to Paul Spong in 1969, “the young scientist was dumbfounded. Not only was the organ much larger than a human brain, but it presented a higher density of convolutions [gyrification]—a feature often used to distinguish human intelligence. Moreover, the neocortex was immense, particularly the portion devoted to the processing of sound…Indeed, for a scientist attuned to cerebral structure, the brain of Moby Doll was an epiphany.”

=== Skin lesions ===
After a month at Jericho, Moby Doll's skin developed lesions which soon spread all over his body. Lab tests on scrapings established that they were due to a fungus. This fungus would not grow in the salinity of ocean water, but Moby Doll's seapen was in water with the low salinity of the Fraser River delta. Though copper sulfate was applied daily to his body, the lesions continued "to advance with extreme rapidity in the week prior to death," wrote Newman and McGeer. The dermatologist at the necropsy said, "the fungus condition was superficial and could not cause death."

=== Harpoon wound ===
Moby Doll had received a harpoon wound at his capture. Newman and McGeer found that, while it had healed on the surface, internally it had "produced a chip fracture of the occipital bone. The chip was about 5 cm. in diameter, involving only the external table." In addition, they found, "There were two very tiny necrotic patches on the occipital surface of the cortex, possibly reflecting a minor degree of damage incurred at the time of the chip fracture of the skull."

=== Infections ===
Newman and McGeer summarized that, "The pathological findings would seem to indicate death from a widespread mycotic infection with a superimposed terminal bacterial infection." There were other obvious contributing factors. In particular, Moby Doll's "extended fast depleted body reserves."

In detail, they wrote, "Macroscopic section of the lungs showed a heavy collection of inflammatory cells, mainly polymorphonuclear leukocytes with numerous macrophages surrounding the nodules. In some areas definite branching mycelia, which were budding, could be seen." Cultures from the lung grew Aspergillus, Staphylococcus and Proteus. Lymph nodes in the neck were similarly infected, and "each kidney contained a mycotic abscess."

=== Measurements ===
Measurements of Moby Doll made at the necropsy, as published in Newman and McGeer's scientific paper: "Length 467 cm. Height of dorsal fin 57 cm. Width of (pectoral) flipper 40 cm. Length of flipper 66 cm. Width of flukes 53 cm. Length of flukes 127 cm. No. of teeth 44, evenly distributed." "Liver 45 kg."

"Examination of the skeleton revealed that the animal was very young," wrote Newman and McGeer.
