= Moby Doll =

Second orca displayed in captivity (July–Oct. 1964)

- Species: Orca (Orcinus orca)
- Born: 1959 est.
- Died: October 9, 1964; Vancouver, British Columbia
- Known for: second captive orca
- Named after: Moby Dick

Moby Doll (c. 1959–9 October 1964) was an orca captured off the coast of British Columbia, Canada in 1964 which survived in captivity for about three months, which allowed for some of the first close study of the species. Moby Doll was the first orca to survive in captivity for more than two days, and the second to be displayed in a public aquarium exhibit. From a recording of Moby Doll's calls, he was years later identified as a member of J Pod of the southern resident orcas. He died due in part to exhaustion and parasite infestation, attributed to his low appetite and the stress of captivity.

At the time of his capture, orcas were widely feared and hated, and about 25% of captured, immature orcas carried evidence of having been wounded by shootings.. In 1972, Washington State Game Department supervisor Garry Garrison declared that orcas "had until recently been the subject of fear and violence. 'They were harassed, shot at, and killed at every opportunity.'" Don White, once an orca researcher at the Vancouver Aquarium and later a critic of orca captivity, wrote in 1975, "Before the capture of Moby Doll, of Namu and of Skana killer whales as a species were regarded by fishermen as vermin. Happily, this is no longer the case."

Moby Doll was kept alive in captivity by the Vancouver Aquarium after being harpooned and not dying as had been planned, leading to an unexpected public interest in the species. Moby Doll's captivity sparked the orca capture era in British Columbia and Washington State.

== History ==
=== Capture ===
The 15 foot (4.6m) long male orca was captured in 1964 near East Point, Saturna Island in British Columbia. His size indicated he was most likely about 5 years old, a juvenile who still relied on other orcas to learn hunting techniques, migration patterns and communication. Sculptor Samuel Burich had been commissioned by the Vancouver Public Aquarium to kill an orca for purposes of using as a model for an art display. Aquarium staff were convinced it would be impossible to handle a live orca safely after the difficulties experienced by Marineland of the Pacific with their capture of Wanda, and subsequent capture attempts.

The collectors mounted a harpoon gun at East Point, Saturna Island on May 20, 1964, as data compiled at the Light House from 1958 to 1963 showed killer whales were particularly common there from May to October (peaking in August with large groups). After several failed attempts, a small orca was seen swimming about 20 meters from the rocks. The large harpoon struck the orca just behind the head, narrowly missing the cervical cord and the brain. The whale appeared stunned but unexpectedly did not die. To the surprise of Burich and his assistant Josef Bauer, other orcas, rather than fleeing, were raising their injured pod-mate to the surface to breathe.

After the pod moved away, the orca tried for hours to expel the harpoon and pull away from the heavy line. Bauer had been moved by the actions of the other orcas and the juvenile orca's cries, and rowed out in a skiff to shield the animal from attempts to shoot him with rifles. No wounds from bullets were later found in Moby Doll.

The Vancouver Aquarium's founder director, Murray Newman, decided to keep the wounded orca alive and bring him to Vancouver, although the local SPCA and others protested passionately. With care, the captors managed to have the young orca trail their small fishing boat like a dog on a leash; he intelligently avoided pain by not dragging on the harpoon rope. Other orcas seemed to be following their movements. Because the aquarium did not have a suitable pool, he was given improvised accommodation at Burrard Dry Dock. When he arrived, the aquarium's assistant curator Vince Penfold and neuroscientist Pat McGeer removed the harpoon and administered medical aid.

To vacate the dock and allow it to return to its regular work, a makeshift sea pen for the orca was constructed on military property at Jericho Beach, a location with less vessel traffic. The pen was "cut into a decrepit and abandoned jetty."

The seven-mile transfer of Moby Doll's berth on July 24 took ten hours, longer than expected, due in part to his resistance and attempts to escape. "The captured killer whale bucked, twisted, squealed angrily, thrashed the water and charged the boat that tried to nudge her into her new home," reported the Vancouver Sun. Sam Burich and Vince Penfold were in the boat.

=== Display ===
On Saturday, July 18, Burrard Dry Dock had been opened for the general public to watch the orca. About 10,000 visitors queued in the rain to see him. Subsequently, the public was kept away, however. Because scientists had never previously been able to study a live orca, aquarium curator Murray Newman was eager to keep Moby Doll for that purpose, more than for display and studies were conducted when visitors were not present. The animal's poor health and well-being led the aquarium to put off any further public viewing of the captive. When Moby Doll was moved to the army base at Jericho Beach, "guards were posted 24 hours a day to protect the whale from the public." However, to Newman's dismay, sightseers followed the orca to Jericho Beach. Moby Doll did not interact with humans to the extent that later captive orcas did. When visitors came, he would withdraw to the opposite end of the sea pen.

Following Moby Doll's move to Jericho, Sam Burich was appointed the animal's full-time guardian. He played music in an attempt to alleviate Moby Doll's loneliness. On some occasions, the orca seemed to duet with him as Burich played a police whistle.

The pen measured about 14 by 23 m. with a water depth from 3 to 7.5 m. varying with the tide. "The whale's habitual circuit of its pen was counterclockwise at speeds of 2 to 4 knots, the loop usually taking 35 seconds. It often blew (respired) once a circuit, but sometimes made two or three circuits on one breath. The routine seemed to be interrupted only at times of calling." "The large size of the animal retarded maneuverability within the pen."

=== Scientific importance ===
Moby Doll allowed scientists to study an orca up-close for the first time, particularly their important method of making sounds for communication. Woods Hole Oceanographic Institution scientists William E. Schevill and William A. Watkins, pioneers in researching whale sounds, traveled to Vancouver to study Moby Doll for two days. Moby Doll gave them proof that orcas used animal echolocation, and also showed that they did not need echolocation when memory or daylight were sufficient for navigation and orientation. He also gave them evidence that orca echolocation was directionally focused by the melon structure in their heads, which had previously been hypothesized.

Their study of Moby Doll's calls was also a scientific first. These were not the "whistle-like squeals" that could be produced simultaneously with echolocation by the other delphinids that had been studied. The orca's calls were pulses of clicks at a very fast repetition-rate, with strong harmonics. (In later research, however, John Ford did detect some whistling to be a minor component of southern resident orca vocalizations, "whereas whistles are the primary social vocalization among the majority of Delphinidae species.")

A separate recording made by UBC scientist H.D. Fisher would, in 1978, have great significance for major orca researcher John Ford. It was the memory of this recording that enabled Ford to identify that Moby Doll had been a member of J Pod of the southern resident orcas. Ford could hear that J Pod had a distinctive animal culture, passing their unique pod-specific dialect from generation to generation. He recently said, "It was a wonderful moment out there in the boat when I recognized the sounds coming from J Pod to be Moby Doll's signature sounds," which were still identifiable decades later among the J Pod orcas.

The juvenile orca's brain weighed 6450 grams, kept by neurologist Pat McGeer, made a massive impression on scientists. It had a very large cortex and huge auditory nerve that gave evidence of the primary importance of sound to orcas. The high density of convolutions suggested exceptional intelligence.

Murray Newman and McGeer rightly came to suspect that orcas do not stop swimming to sleep, because the guards that were posted to Moby Doll's pen never observed it.

=== Sex confusion ===
Assistant curator Vince Penfold said at the time, "there is so much similarity in the appearance of mature females and immature males it will be impossible to tell until a closer look can be taken at the animal." The waters of the Fraser River which flowed through Moby Doll's pen did not allow for the clearest views of his underside, and males develop their much larger dorsal fin when in their mid-teens. When assistant curator Penfold went diving in Moby Doll's pen, he did so from a wire cage to protect himself, which also hindered up-close examination.

"The whale was originally thought to be male, so was first nicknamed Hound Dog for the docile way it swam" to Vancouver at the end of the harpoon line. However, aquarium curator Murray Newman was under public pressure, however, to choose a feminine name for the whale supposedly to match his docile behaviour. On July 22, the Vancouver Sun reported that Newman had selected Moby Doll, in spite of the uncertainty of the animal's sex. On July 27, Penfold announced that he had had a close enough look to conclude that Moby was female. The lower-ranked Joe Bauer and a four-year-old visitor had reported seeing Moby Doll's penis, but neither person's observation was taken seriously. Moby Doll's male sex was confirmed only after death. When Sam Burich the sculptor-capturer eventually completed his model of the whale the following year, he made a special casting of the penis as a gift for his onetime assistant Bauer, who had shielded the orca from the bullets.

=== Feeding difficulty ===
Moby Doll did not eat for nearly two months after being captured. Initially, aquarium staff believed the orca would eat salmon and herring but this was not successful. The fish that were offered were much smaller than the southern resident orca's normal prey. When one-pound fish were lowered into the water, the juvenile orca ignored them and inadvertently knocked them off the lines with his tail as he continued swimming around the pen, probably oblivious to the fact that they were intended as food. As the staff became increasingly concerned, other foods were sometimes tried in efforts to stimulate the orca's appetite. Some of those, for example, whale meat, could have been suitable if Moby Doll had been a different type of orca, such as a local Bigg's (transient) orca, but at the time there was no knowledge that orca sub-types had specialized diets. President of the Aquarium Society Ald. Aeneas Bell-Irving called Moby Doll's pen a sick bay and speculated that it might take several months to have him "eating out of hand" and being friendly. At times staff supposed that Moby Doll had eaten a few small fish, but no one actually saw him eating.

In early September, assistant curator Vince Penfold reported that the moody and docile orca of the first weeks after his capture had become friskier, at times tail slapping and even breaching, although the public was still not permitted to visit the whale until a permanent pen might be built. The feeding breakthrough came on September 9. The Vancouver Sun's headline was simply, "Moby Doll Eats." "It was the first time anyone had seen Moby eat," the report continued.

Ted Griffin's account of the events diverges from the Vancouver Aquarium's. Griffin, the owner of the Seattle Marine Aquarium, had been one of the first people trying to capture orcas alive. Curious to see the Vancouver Aquarium's captive, he drove his runabout with his wife from Puget Sound to Vancouver. He gained unauthorized access to the army base where Moby Doll's pen was located by tying up at the Jericho pier. Accustomed to seeing orcas in the wild, "he was disappointed by Moby Doll's gaunt and lethargic appearance." Griffin boldly grabbed a live fish off a string, and slapped it on the water in his hand. He recalled later, "soon Moby Doll was excitedly zooming by looking at the fish which I held in my hand. Finally, the whale came up to the float, stopped, rolled partly on its side, opened its mouth, and yanked the fish away."

This was the first known hand-feeding of an orca. Something about Griffin's approach had made a connection with the juvenile orca. In time, researchers would find that the sharing of food is a key to orca society, and Moby Doll may have need an invitation to eat.

When aquarium director Murray Newman arrived on the scene, he scolded the intruding Seattle Marine Aquarium director who was his rival—but his staff began imitating Griffin.

The Vancouver Aquarium did not give any detailed explanation for the change in Moby Doll's behaviour. The Vancouver Sun account blandly reported that "Moby Doll finally got really hungry," yet orcas, unlike some other whale species, are not physiologically suited to long fasts, and forage multiple times every day. Newman himself the following day made it evident that the approach to feeding Moby Doll had become more intimate. He was photographed using a far shorter pole than before, to dangle fish at the surface for the orca to take directly, as Moby Doll rolled over, "to show her belly and her 24 pointed teeth two inches long." Even horse meat was reportedly eaten, which suggests that the type of food offered had not been the greatest obstacle. Vince Penfold went even further on the 14th. He told the Vancouver Sun that "he simply held out each of 23 fish as Moby swam by...she opened her mouth and he dropped them in." Moby rejected one type of fish, however. When Penfold held out an orange rock fish, he swam away and slapped the surface of the water. From September 9, "Moby Doll displayed a ravenous appetite, gaining weight steadily."

The feeding problem was solved, but aquarium staff remained intent on searching for a better site with more consistent salinity and tidal cleansing of the water, amid concerns over an unsightly skin condition that Moby Doll had developed.

Moby Doll's later feeding routine is described in an article written by Murray Newman and Pat McGeer. In their discussion, they stated that, while Orcinus orca was well known as a hunter of marine mammals, "the young specimen captured at Saturna Island preferred fish to mammalian flesh."

After not eating for about 54 days, Moby Doll subsequently ate 45–90 kg of fish per day, fed by hand. Vitamins and minerals were added to the fish. Pacific cod was the main fish given. (In the photo of Murray Newman hand-feeding Moby Doll, this is the fish.) Other soft-rayed fishes, such as lingcod and salmon, were also well received by the young orca. Spiny fishes, such as rockfishes, were often rejected, and he also rejected dogfish sharks even after the removal of the spines.

Moby Doll was soon reacting to fish being slapped on the water, and allowed himself to be touched. The feeder most famously photographed is trainer Terry McLeod, and Moby Doll seemed to visually examine fish before eating them. The orca ate slowly, and did not chew but swallowed food whole/ When he wanted more food, Moby Doll frequently engaged in "lob-tailing and flipper-slapping...These behavior patterns seemed to indicate annoyance."

Moby Doll's surface activity increased after he started eating, with signs of playfulness being observed when feeding.

=== Death ===
Moby Doll ate substantially on October 8, but the next day ate only one fish. Aquarium staff were called to the pen and Pat McGeer recalled Moby Doll seemed to have trouble surfacing to take in air, before he sank and drowned. Joe Bauer "found army divers reluctant to enter the pen," because they were "petrified" of the killer whale.

Aquarium staff were heartbroken when the body was recovered about 5:15 p.m. McGeer said, "It was like a death in the family." Murray Newman said, "Moby was the most fascinating of all captive animals. I loved that whale. I think that capturing it was the best thing I ever did."

=== Necropsy ===
The scientists who performed the necropsy on the dead orca included medical doctors, a dermatologist, a pathologist, a biologist, and a neurochemist (McGeer). Orcas had been little studied at the time, however, and ideas varied about what caused Moby Doll's weakness and drowning. Multiple possible contributing factors have been given differing emphases in subsequent writings.

The skin condition that marred Moby Doll's appearance drew a lot of attention, but opinions were divided about its seriousness with the dermatologist saying it was not fatal The cause of the fungus condition was attributed to the low salinity of the Fraser River delta where Moby Doll's pen was located.

The necropsy uncovered other health problems that would have weakened Moby. On the surface, "the harpoon wound had healed well," but internally the orca had a skull fracture and worm infestation. The worms that infested the stomachs of Moby Doll were tentatively identified as a nematode parasite of the Pacific cod that was fed to him. Infections were present in the lungs, kidneys, and lymph nodes in the neck. Although Moby Doll had been eating for a month, his body condition was still assessed as "emaciated," with the ribcage visible under a thin layer of blubber. His weight at death was 1040 kg.

Writing later, Newman and McGeer summarized: "The enervating effects of acute mycotic and bacterial infections together with the debilitated condition of the animal probably led to exhaustion and drowning in the water of low salinity." McGeer said the low salinity, compared to the ocean, was probably a tremendous strain for the orca to maintain buoyancy. Moby Doll's trainer Terry McLeod reaffirmed this view in 2015. In the end, McGeer laid the blame on a lack of funding from the community to create new facilities for the public aquarium.

In the spirit of dissection dominating biology in that era, scientists coveted Moby's body parts. McGeer made the critical decision to keep Moby Doll's brain, which became a pivotal part of the orca's legacy through Greenpeace.

== Legacy ==
=== At the Vancouver Aquarium ===
Although not on display after 18 June 1964, Moby Doll generated widespread publicity, and attendances doubled. After this initiation into capturing orcas, aquarium officials were eager for more. In their scientific paper, Newman and McGeer's final words about Moby Doll were, "The experience indicated the feasibility of maintaining and possibly training killer whales in captivity." Sam Burich's sculpture, completed the following year, was placed in a foyer leading to a tank that would house subsequent captive killer whales, and was visible to them.

=== Walter the Whale, later renamed Skana ===
Although the Vancouver Aquarium wanted to replace Moby Doll, nearly three years passed before it opportunistically acquired Walter the Whale, another southern resident orca, in March 1967. "Walter the Whale," as the orca was advertised, had been rented from the Seattle Public Aquarium by Bob O'Loughlin to appear at the Vancouver Boat Show. The orca had helped the Boat Show "to an attendance record of more than 100,000." As the orca was already in the city, the aquarium did not want to miss this opportunity, and bought Walter.

==== Feeding Walter ====
The aquarium's assistant curator Vince Penfold donned a scuba suit and welcomed the orca with lunch underwater, captured in the Vancouver Sun in an innovative underwater photograph. The aquarium staff had learnt a great deal from their time with Moby Doll. With the more knowledgeable practices they implemented, Walter, renamed Skana, survived for thirteen years to be "the star of Stanley Park, giving millions their first close-up view of a killer whale." The orca was fed "100 pounds of fish, mostly ling cod and herring, in four daily feedings," illustrated in an intimate photograph with Terry McLeod, who had also been Moby Doll's trainer.

==== Sex confusion with Walter ====
Weighing approximately 3,000 pounds and "just under 15 feet" long, this was still an immature orca, whose dorsal fin could not indicate sex. In Walter's new tank at the Vancouver Aquarium, Vince Penfold reversed the sexing problem he had had with Moby Doll, whose feminine name, Doll, had been given to a male orca. This time a masculine name, Walter, had been given to a female orca prior to the Vancouver Aquarium's involvement. The assistant curator said, "With the clear water it was easy for a biologist to make the distinction." This quickly prompted hopes for a pregnancy. The name Walter was not considered fitting, and after a contest with over 5,000 entries, the aquarium selected for her the name Skana.

==== Stardom ====
"Skana brought heady times to Vancouver. From the moment she took her first turn in the pool, the young whale was the aquarium's prime attraction and an invaluable asset to the city's growing tourist industry. That first spring, Stanley Park saw traffic like it never had before, with tourists and locals alike packing the aquarium. Then came the summer crush. In August alone, 119,746 people visited, bringing the year's total to 527,536—an 80 percent increase over the same period in 1966."

=== Public perceptions ===
In these waters at that time, orcas' generic experience of humans would be being shot by fishermen, who considered them vermin.

Moby Doll was popular locally and abroad. According to the obituary in The Times of London, "the widespread publicity – some of it the first positive press ever about killer whales – marked the beginning of an important change in the public attitude toward the species."

"Moby Doll's time in Vancouver was brief, but he had made his mark...His unplanned capture proved the viability of holding a killer whale in captivity, and it hinted at the potential of live orcas as tourist attractions. It also revealed the emotional attachment the species could generate."

=== Orca sales ===
A pivotal aspect of Moby Doll's captivity was manifested in the immediate offers to buy him. They came from Charlie White of the Undersea Gardens at Oak Bay Marina on Vancouver Island, and from Marineland of the Pacific in California, which had captured Wanda, the diseased first orca ever held in captivity. White's ambition was to have an orca performing for tourists. Murray Newman rejected the offers of $20,000 for the orca, which were splashed in the newspapers, claiming the orca would be worth a million, and that aquarium officials were interested in the scientific, not commercial, value of the orca. Nonetheless, the public discovered that the 'vermin', when captured alive, had a dollar value, a large one. Vancouver's mayor, William Rathie, disagreed with Newman, saying he was all for selling it and for maintaining "a permanent whale-hunting expedition" to catch orcas for profit.

Like Moby Doll's, the next orca capture, Namu's, was unplanned. When the orca was trapped by a fishing net near the town of Namu, British Columbia, one of the fishermen, Robert "Lonnie" McGarvey, remembering Newman's valuation of Moby Doll, believed the "blackfish" would make him some money, and started looking for a customer, and found one. Thus Moby Doll's captivity sparked the beginning of the commerce in live, captive orcas as a kind of marine circus animal.

Between 1962 and 1977, a total of 68 orcas were identifiably captured or killed during capture operations in British Columbia and Washington State. Moby Doll's particular community, the southern resident orcas, suffered the greatest losses. By pod or capture location, 48 of the 68 were identified as southern residents. The captures were selective for physically immature orcas less than 4.5m in length: 30 of the 48 southern residents were in this category.

=== Trainers ===
Terry McLeod was a young diver who worked as a collector for the Vancouver Aquarium and cared for many of its animals. When just nineteen years old, he became Moby Doll's trainer, and "was the person who spent the most time with the orca at the Jericho Army Base." He appears in some photographs hand-feeding him.

Subsequently, aquarium director Murray Newman "sent the young man to Sea Life Park on Oahu to apprentice in marine mammal training." He then became the chief trainer at the Vancouver Aquarium, focusing on two dolphins, before becoming Skana's trainer. With his assistant Mark Perry, he performed daily in the water with this orca.

When seventeen, Perry had been one of those who sneaked onto the army base to see Moby Doll. He was familiar with the fishermen's hatred of orcas. Moby Doll's explosive breath scared him, and the orca's tall dorsal fin mesmerized him, but he "couldn't believe how placid it was."

That encounter shaped his future career. In 1967, he took a job as a floor boy at the Vancouver Aquarium, when Skana was captive. Soon he was assisting Terry McLeod in shows. He quickly developed doubts about orca captivity, like his colleague Paul Spong, but did not want to give up working with the orca. In 1968, when the Vancouver Aquarium acquired more captive orcas and opened the Garden Bay Whale Station, Perry "was the natural choice" to run it. Later, he was hired by Sealand of the Pacific to work with a captive orca named Haida.

=== The brain and Greenpeace ===
After the necropsy, Pat McGeer kept Moby Doll's brain at his UBC neurological lab.

In early 1967, McGeer created a position there that included a contract for research on cetaceans at the Vancouver Aquarium. The position went to Paul Spong, a postdoctoral researcher in physiological psychology at UCLA. Spong studied the aquarium's orcas but began to question their captivity. In early 1969, McGeer gave Spong Moby Doll's brain. "The young scientist was dumbfounded. Not only was the organ much larger than a human brain, but it presented a higher density of convolutions, a feature often used to distinguish human intelligence. Moreover, the neocortex was immense, particularly the portion devoted to the processing of sound. For the first time, Spong grasped the fundamentally acoustic nature of orcas and in the process realized what a limited view of them his visual acuity tests had provided. Indeed, for a scientist attuned to cerebral structure, the brain of Moby Doll was an epiphany. What secrets did this large and complex organ hold? What sort of creature was Orcinus orca?"

On June 3, Spong gave a presentation at the UBC campus, during which he concluded that the Vancouver Aquarium should put its captive orcas "back into the ocean." The following day, aquarium director Murray Newman ended Spong's contract.

A few years later, Farley Mowat visited Vancouver to promote his book A Whale for the Killing (1972). Spong talked to him for hours, and "Mowat drew Spong's attention to commercial whaling," leading him to become an anti-whaling activist. He joined with Robert Hunter in the Stop Ahab Committee, which became the dominant faction of the old Greenpeace organization.

Just before Greenpeace's first big anti-whaling event, Spong had Moby Doll's larger brain photographed next to a human brain, as a means of persuading people that whales deserved to be protected. When launching their first expedition, in April 1975, the activists "unfurled a flag featuring an indigenous image of a killer whale as they departed," with poetic justice, from Jericho Beach. It came to pass that great whales all around the world partly owed their survival to the posthumous influence of the harpooned juvenile orca from J Pod of the southern resident orcas, who had swum in circles in a sea pen at Jericho Beach.

== See also ==
- List of individual cetaceans
