= Namu =

Namu or NAMU may refer to:

== Acronyms ==
- The National Art Museum of Ukraine
- The North American Monetary Union

== Places ==
- Namu, British Columbia, a town in Canada
- Namu, Taumako, an archaeological site on the Pacific island of Taumako in the Duff Islands
- Namu Atoll, Marshall Islands, an atoll in the Pacific Ocean

== Other uses ==
- Namu, local Māori name for the Austrosimulium genus of flies found in New Zealand (a.k.a. sandflies)
- Namu, a character in the Japanese manga Dragon Ball
- Namu (orca), one of the first orcas (killer whales) displayed in captivity.
- Namu doll, a type of Pullip doll
- Namu, the Killer Whale, a 1966 American film
- Yang Erche Namu, a Chinese singer and writer of Mosuo ethnicity

== See also ==
- Namuwiki, a Korean-language wiki
