= Walter the Whale =

Historic star captive killer whale

Walter the Whale (Skana) was a star orca (killer whale) during the early era of captive orcas in the 1960s. In 1967, following the death of Namu, the only other established star orca was Shamu. Walter the Whale was the orca's advertised name at first, but she was later renamed Skana.

Walter was captured from K Pod of the southern resident orcas in 1967 by Ted Griffin, and shipped to the Seattle Public Aquarium. Soon the orca was transported by truck to Vancouver in a rental arrangement with boat show producer Bob O'Loughlin.

The Province reported that due to public curiosity about "the background of killer whales," Walter was the "biggest draw" of the 1967 Vancouver Boat Show, held at the Pacific National Exhibition (PNE) grounds. Walter's presence at the show helped set an attendance record of more than 100,000 individuals, and promoted boat sales.

After the conclusion of the boat show, the Vancouver Aquarium bought Walter, who became their first orca since Moby Doll.

== Boat show producer Bob O'Loughlin's search for an orca ==
Even before the capture of Moby Doll, Bob O'Loughlin had failed in several attempts to catch an orca at Seattle. During one attempt, one of O'Loughlin's men fired a tranquilizer dart from a Seattle Police Department helicopter and hit a young orca with the dart. While that appeared to keep the orca relaxing at the surface, another orca perceptively knocked out the dart and pushed their podmate out of danger, according to Seattle Public Aquarium owner Ted Griffin.

== Capture ==
Bob O'Loughlin was able to obtain an orca after Ted Griffin trapped 15 southern resident orcas, all from K Pod, in Yukon Harbor in Puget Sound on February 15, 1967. This was the first deliberate multi-orca capture, and marked the full transition of orca captivity from opportunistic novelty to commercial enterprise. In the following years, the demand would outstrip the supply of captured orcas.

Griffin would take five of these captured whales to the Seattle Public Aquarium. Two were quickly sold to SeaWorld San Diego. One remaining orca was rented to O'Loughlin.

== Portland no-show ==
Ted Griffin had hoped to deliver a rented orca to the Portland Boat, Trailer and Sports Show, which opened February 17. Bob O'Loughlin, who was producing the show, built a tank for the whale. Corralling selected whales out of the 15 held in Yukon Harbor proved to be a long and difficult process, however. Griffin's first secured catch was "a nine-foot suckling calf" on February 24, two days before the Portland show ended. The Portland plan was dead for 1967, but the traveling Boat and Sports Show was about to move to Vancouver, British Columbia, in March, and the rental agreement was continuing. (The next year, the Portland plan would be fulfilled with another orca from this capture operation—Kandu.)

== Name ==
Even before he had received a whale, O'Loughlin's three children, ages 6 to 9, had already decided on a name for the orca—Walter the Whale.

At an estimated 16 feet (4.9 metres), the orca chosen for the Vancouver Boat Show was the largest and eldest of the five secured at the Seattle Public Aquarium, and the last to arrive, on March 4. Though O'Loughlin was already using the name Walter in advertising, there were some opinions this orca was female. Ted Griffin was quizzed, "Is Walter a Walter?" He said, "Frankly, we don't know yet. But it makes no difference to him if we call him Walter."

== At the Vancouver Boat Show, March 10 to 19, 1967 ==
Ted Griffin personally managed the whole rental operation, remaining with Walter throughout the Boat Show.

During the 4-hour trip by truck from Seattle to Vancouver, attendants sloshed buckets of water over the orca to provide vital moisture. Just outside the PNE Agrodome, a tent was set up over a circular portable tank 34 feet across and eight feet deep. This was the orca's space for the Boat Show.

Following continual phone calls from irate citizens who didn't "want Walter to become another Moby Doll or Namu," the SPCA took particular interest in the whale. An SPCA officer checked the tank and raised concerns over its size, and over the orca's separation from the other members of the pod. Daily inspections continued, but the SPCA took no other action.

Feeding was another issue. Griffin was trying to wean all the captured orcas onto dead herring, and only fed Walter twice in a week to keep the orca hungry. Nonetheless, the southern resident orca was reluctant to eat the food, and was force fed with a pump.

In these early days, the elaborate routines featured in later shows did not exist. Walter's show was given in an era when fishermen normally shot orcas. "Each hour, hundreds of sightseers filed into the tent, where Griffin gave a brief presentation about orcas, assuring listeners that the species was far friendlier than most believed. Visitors could then approach the pool, where the bravest could offer the whale herring and even rub his rubbery skin." The orca's future trainer Mark Perry in a 2013 interview recalled that "the water in the pool was dirty, making it hard to get a good look." "I don't know what was in it, but it was turbid and kind of crappy-looking," he told Jason Colby. "All you could see was the fin, like Moby Doll." To be sure, it was fascinating to see an orca that close, Perry acknowledged, "but I also thought, at the time, 'this is really sad.'"

On March 16, Vancouver's leading radio host Jack Webster broadcast Walter in "the first whale-to-whale telephone call in history." (The Province's photograph illustrates what phones looked like at the time.) At the other end of the line at the Seattle Public Aquarium were two younger podmates—Katy and Kandu. At first the call went badly, as only two nearby seals responded. "But Walter was persistent...the three whales all began squeaking 45 minutes later," "chewing the fat like old buddies." The hour-long long distance call cost $150.

== At the Vancouver Aquarium ==
The Boat Show turned out to be a prelude to a long career when the Vancouver Aquarium did not want to let the rented star orca leave the city and bought Walter. The day after the Boat Show closed, the southern resident orca was trucked from the PNE grounds at Hastings Park to the Vancouver Aquarium at Stanley Park.

The orca was assigned to the "outdoor porpoise pool," displacing its inhabitants. Although often referred to as porpoises, these were three Pacific white-sided dolphins. Later in the week, one of them, a female, was reintroduced into the tank as delphinid company for the orca, though being the quicker of the two, she was trained to eat at the opposite end of the pool to prevent theft of the orca's food. There was no knowledge in that era of the difference between mammal-eating transient orcas and fish-eating resident orcas, but as it happened Walter, like all the orcas being captured in that period, belonged to the non-dolphin-eating resident ecotype.

The Province's columnist Himie Koshevoy described the orca "issuing small mewing noises sounding like a kitten seeking comfort." The aquarium's assistant curator Vince Penfold donned a scuba suit and welcomed the orca with lunch underwater, captured in the Vancouver Sun in one of the great early orca photographs. The Vancouver Aquarium staff had learnt a great deal from their time with Moby Doll; with the more knowledgeable practices they implemented with Walter, the aquarium would be repaid with interest by this orca's extraordinary stardom. The whale was fed "100 pounds of fish, mostly ling cod and herring, in four daily feedings," illustrated in an intimate photograph with Terry McLeod, who had also been Moby Doll's trainer.

== Walter is renamed Skana ==
Weighing approximately 3,000 pounds and "just under 15 feet" long, this orca was not mature, with a dorsal fin that could not indicate the orca's sex. In Walter's new tank at the Vancouver Aquarium, Vince Penfold reversed the problem he had had with Moby Doll, whose "feminine" name had been given to a male orca. This time a "masculine" name had been given to a female orca prior to the Vancouver Aquarium's involvement. The assistant curator said, "With the clear water it was easy for a biologist to make the distinction." This quickly prompted hopes for a pregnancy. The name Walter was not considered fitting, and after a contest with over 5,000 entries, the aquarium selected for her the name Skana.

== Skana's immediate stardom ==
From the moment the young orca arrived, she became the Vancouver Aquarium's "prime attraction and an invaluable asset to the city's growing tourist industry. That first spring, Stanley Park saw traffic like it never had before, with tourists and locals alike packing the aquarium. Then came the summer crush. In August alone, 119,746 people visited, bringing the year's total to 527,536—an 80 percent increase over the same period in 1966."

== Death ==
On October 5, 1980, Skana died from an advanced fungal infection.
