= Dawn Brancheau =

American SeaWorld trainer (1969–2010)

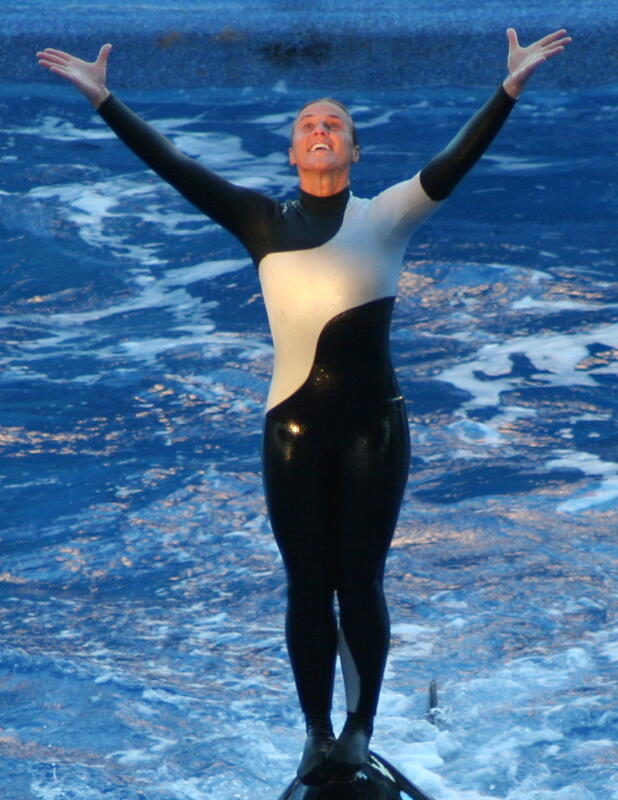
- Brancheau working at SeaWorld Orlando in 2006 standing on Takara's rostrum during "Believe"
- Born: Dawn Therese LoVerde; April 16, 1969; Cedar Lake, Indiana, U.S.
- Died: February 24, 2010 (aged 40); Orlando, Florida, U.S.
- Cause of death: Blunt force trauma and drowning
- Resting place: Holy Sepulchre Cemetery, Worth Township, Illinois, U.S.
- Education: University of South Carolina
- Occupation: SeaWorld Orlando trainer
- Years active: 1994–2010
- Spouse: Scott Brancheau (m. 1996)

Dawn Therese Brancheau (née LoVerde; April 16, 1969 – February 24, 2010) was an American animal trainer at SeaWorld. She worked with orcas at SeaWorld Orlando for fifteen years, including a leading role in revamping the Shamu show, and was SeaWorld's poster girl. She was killed by an orca, Tilikum, who was also involved in the deaths of Keltie Byrne and Daniel P. Dukes.

== Life and career ==
Brancheau was born Dawn Therese LoVerde in Cedar Lake, Indiana, and was the youngest of six children. She set her heart on becoming a Shamu trainer during a family vacation to Orlando. She graduated from the University of South Carolina with degrees in psychology and animal behavior. Away from work, she volunteered at a local animal shelter, looked after two chocolate Labradors, and kept various stray ducks, chickens, rabbits, and small birds at her home.

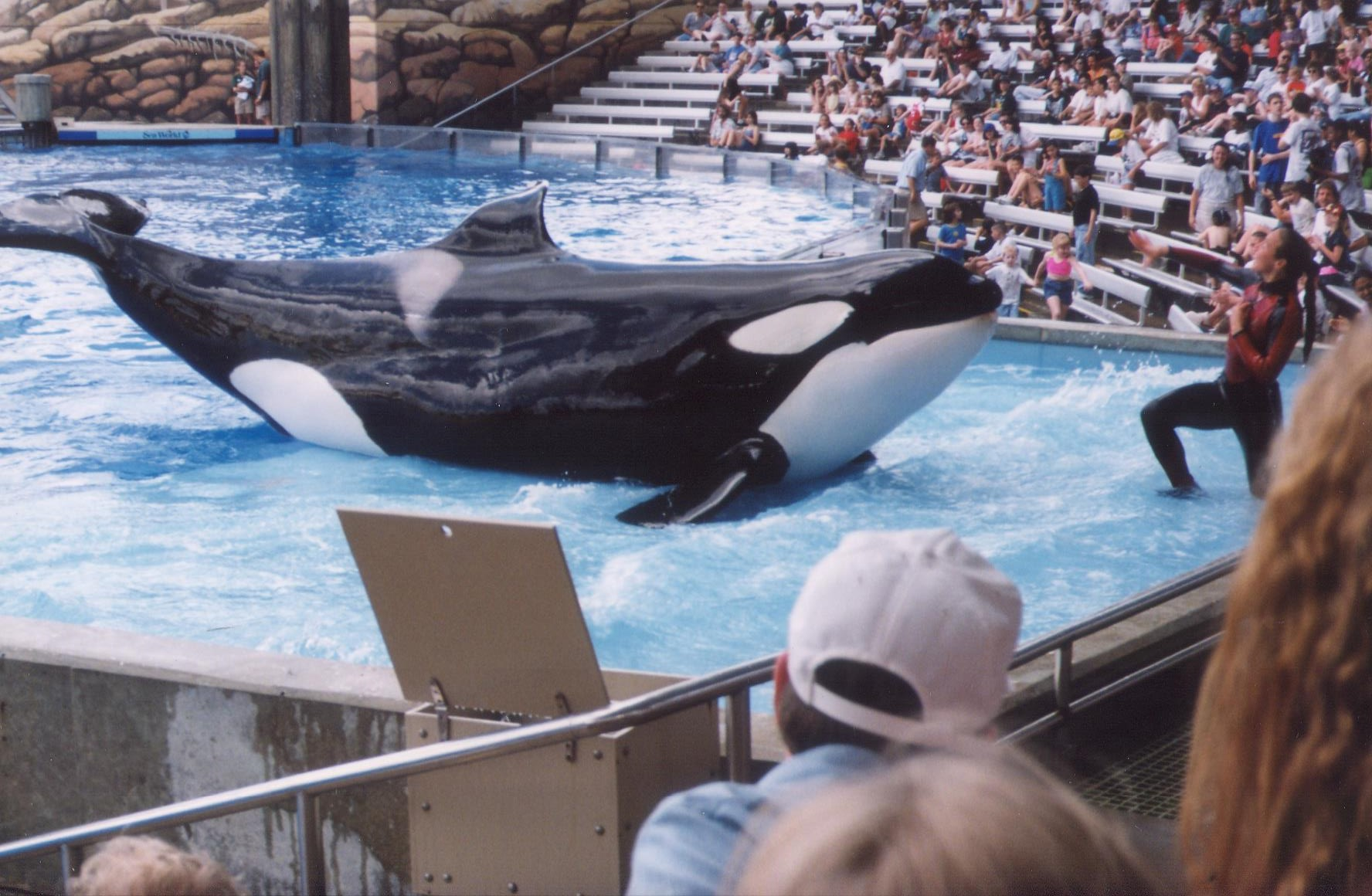
Brancheau on a slide out, which is a platform covered by less than a foot of water, with orca Katina at SeaWorld Orlando

Brancheau spent two years working with dolphins at Six Flags Great Adventure in New Jersey before beginning her career at SeaWorld Orlando in 1994, initially working with otters and sea lions. In 1996, the same year she married Scott Brancheau, a SeaWorld stunt water skier, she started working with orcas.

In 2000, she appeared on NBC affiliate WESH and discussed staying physically fit to deal with the intense rigor of working with orcas. To accomplish this, she ran marathons, cycled, and lifted weights. In 2006, her decade's work with orcas was profiled, including her leadership role in a two- to three-year revamp of the Shamu show. Brancheau acknowledged the dangers of working in close proximity to orcas. As a senior trainer, she appeared in various SeaWorld public performances for many years. The Shamu show's interaction of animal trainers with orcas was regarded as SeaWorld's star attraction.

She was featured on SeaWorld billboards throughout Orlando. Judge and later Supreme Court Justice Brett Kavanaugh, a dissenting judge in a legal case involving her death (see below), stated that "To be fearless, courageous, tough – to perform a sport or activity at the highest levels of human capacity, even in the face of known physical risk – is among the greatest forms of personal achievement for many who take part in these activities."

Brancheau also appeared in season 4, episode 4, of Fetch! With Ruff Ruffman, "Ruff Pigs Out and Has a Whale of a Time".

== Death ==
On February 24, 2010, Brancheau performed a "Dine with Shamu" show with Tilikum, the largest orca at SeaWorld Orlando. In this setting, guests ate at an open-air restaurant while watching the performance poolside as the orca performed and was fed. As part of the end-of-show routine, she was at the edge of the pool rubbing Tilikum's head, and was lying next to him on a slide-out when she suddenly yelped "Ouch" and was pulled into the water by either her left forearm or her ponytail. The incident was caught on film; some witnesses reported seeing Tilikum grab Brancheau by the ponytail or shoulder. Additionally, at least a dozen patrons witnessed Brancheau in the water with Tilikum. The orca's moves seem to have been very quick as he pulled her underwater and drowned her. Employees used nets and threw food in the water in an attempt to distract him. While moving from pool to pool in the complex, they eventually directed Tilikum to a smaller, medical pool, where it would be easier to calm him down. After approximately 45 minutes, Tilikum released Brancheau's body.

The autopsy report said that Brancheau died from drowning and blunt force trauma. Her spinal cord was severed, and she had sustained fractures to her jawbone, ribs, and a cervical vertebra. Her scalp was completely torn off from her head, her left arm was torn off and her left knee had been dislocated.

Brancheau was buried at Holy Sepulchre Cemetery in Worth Township, Cook County, Illinois.

== Aftermath ==
=== Safety ===
No SeaWorld trainer would ever again enter a pool to perform a show with an orca following Brancheau's death. Immediately afterwards, SeaWorld disallowed trainers from being in the water with any orca. This internal, voluntary prohibition was similar to what happened after other injuries to animal trainers. Each time, the temporary pause had been lifted by SeaWorld. However, this time the ban was solidified by an Occupational Safety and Health Administration (OSHA) intervention. This led SeaWorld to repeatedly seek the lifting of various aspects of OSHA's citations and rulings until 2014, when it decided not to go to the Supreme Court.

Brancheau was the second trainer to be killed by a SeaWorld orca after Alexis Martínez. Brancheau was the third fatality associated with Tilikum and the fourth by a captive orca. Since orcas were first placed in captivity in the 1960s, there have been more than 40 documented safety incidents, with dozens of trainers being seriously injured by various orcas. After a 2006 attack, an OSHA investigation in 2007 concluded that, "The continuing factors to the incident, in the simplest of terms, is that swimming with captive orcas is inherently dangerous, and if someone hasn't been killed already, it is only a matter of time before it does happen." SeaWorld successfully challenged the report, which OSHA agreed to withdraw.

On December 24, 2009, two months before Brancheau's death, another SeaWorld-owned orca, Keto, killed trainer Alexis Martínez at Loro Parque in the Canary Islands. Four SeaWorld orcas had been transferred to the park in February 2006, and SeaWorld staff trained a group of Loro Parque trainers in San Antonio and Orlando. In September 2006, Brancheau had temporarily worked at Loro Parque and reportedly enjoyed working with Martínez. SeaWorld discontinued water work at its three parks for about a week immediately following Martínez's death.

On August 23, 2010, SeaWorld was fined US$75,000 by OSHA for three safety violations, one directly related to Brancheau's death. OSHA maintained that SeaWorld "willfully" endangered its employees and stated that the company "(shows) plain indifference to, or intentional disregard for, employee safety and health." SeaWorld issued a statement that called OSHA's findings "unfounded". SeaWorld challenged the OSHA fine and the safety report in legal proceedings, stating that "OSHA's allegations in this citation are unsupported by any evidence or precedent and reflect a fundamental lack of understanding of the safety requirements associated with marine mammal care." At a preliminary hearing in 2011, one of these citations was withdrawn by OSHA.

In late May 2012, Judge Ken S. Welsch formally sided with OSHA over SeaWorld's orca safety practices. Welsch was sharply critical of SeaWorld's assertion that it was unaware that working with orcas posed a hazard to employees. Welsch stated it is "implausible" and "difficult to reconcile" with comments repeatedly made by management and with the litany of trainer incidents and injuries that have occurred over the years. However, Welsch did agree that the fine classification was too severe and had it downgraded – from "willful" (total of $75,000 for the 2 citations) to "serious" (total of $12,000) – stating that the company had emphasized trainer safety despite the safety procedures being ineffective.

The court stated that while SeaWorld's expert, "Mr. Andrews concludes his report by stating, 'My expert opinion is that SeaWorld can safely allow trainers to closely interact with killer whales, including waterwork, with the administrative and engineering controls that existed prior to February 24, 2010' (Exh. C-15, p. 10)," the court found otherwise: "As noted in the section addressing the recognized hazard, SeaWorld's own incident reports demonstrate that its safety program, either due to misplaced faith in operant conditioning or due to human error in implementing operant conditioning, exposes its trainers to the risks of death or serious physical injury." The court amplified this, aligning itself with the OSHA expert witness: "Dr. Duffus stated, '[T]he training program that SeaWorld uses is influential. It does work. My point is that it does not work all the time' (Tr. 911). The court agrees with Dr. Duffus. SeaWorld's training program is highly detailed, well-communicated, and intensive. Yet it cannot remove the element of unpredictability inherent in working with killer whales."

Welsch made it clear that his ruling only applied "to the work trainers do during shows and not at other times, such as during medical procedures or 'relationship-building' sessions... As a custodian SeaWorld has an ethical duty to provide for the whales' needs... husbandry activities require a certain amount of contact between the trainers and whales... unlike performances, which can successfully continue without the trainers in the water." OSHA did state that it would accept other means of protection as long as it provided equal or greater safety as the physical barriers. SeaWorld looked at rising pool floors and "spare air" systems in an attempt to get their staff back in the water during shows. Given the court rulings, even after 2010, although water work during shows stopped, SeaWorld trainers still entered the water with orcas during "safety desensitization training" and for other care.

SeaWorld filed a series of appeals as it sought to return to water performances. In 2012, a special Labor Department commission declined to hear the case. Since the Shamu show's display of interactions between trainers and orcas was seen as having been SeaWorld's star attraction, SeaWorld contended that it was fundamental to its business. In April 2014, the US Court of Appeals for the District of Columbia denied a "petition for review", with later Supreme Court justice Brett Kavanaugh being the sole judge to side with SeaWorld. In 2015, SeaWorld was cited again, in San Diego, for not adequately protecting orca trainers.

Although Brancheau's widower, Scott Brancheau, hired a Chicago law firm that specializes in wrongful-death litigation, he did not take any legal action against SeaWorld.

=== Blackfish ===
Brancheau's death is a focus of the documentary Blackfish, which criticizes keeping orcas in captivity, and shows how her death awakened a national conversation about the issue. The documentary's director, Gabriela Cowperthwaite, argued that the claim that Tilikum had targeted Brancheau because she had worn her hair in a ponytail was conjecture and that "there had to be more to this story".

Her family has stated they are grateful the film brought attention to the issue of animal welfare. However, they also stated that "Blackfish is not Dawn's story" and that "Since Dawn's death in 2010, the media has focused mainly on the whales. A human life was lost that day, and it feels as though some believe her death was just a footnote." In the same statement, they also said that "Dawn would not have remained a trainer at SeaWorld for 15 years if she felt that the whales were not well cared for."

=== SeaWorld ===
Brancheau's death has been seen as a factor in starting a trajectory of recalibration for SeaWorld. In addition to the impact of OSHA-imposed safety-based abatements of previous work practices to prevent future incidents, Cowperthwaite began working on Blackfish in 2010 following Dawn's death, initially having questions about SeaWorld's "ponytail hypothesis". Cowperthwaite's background research suggested to her there were problems with keeping captive orcas. SeaWorld disagreed, characterising the film as propaganda.

After its release in 2013, the film awakened a national dialogue about the issue. SeaWorld struggled with the effect of Blackfish on public perception, and there were some cancellations by music performers who planned to hold shows at SeaWorld. SeaWorld transitioned to being a publicly traded company in 2013.

Lawmakers in California and the US House of Representatives proposed legislation to phase out orca captivity, and the California Coastal Commission moved in 2015 to ban orca breeding. In March 2016, SeaWorld announced it was discontinuing its program of breeding captive orcas and was partnering with the Humane Society of the United States to work against commercial whaling and seal hunts, shark finning, ocean pollution and increasing its focus on rescue operations.

=== Statutory confidentiality ===
In 2011, Florida passed Statute 406.136, which provides for confidentiality of media obtained by public agencies that depicts or records the killing of a person. The law was partly a response to the circumstances of Brancheau's death. Local government investigators and OSHA had obtained SeaWorld's video surveillance footage, which captured her death, as well as photographs, which showed the effects of the attack. News organizations tried to obtain these media items as records in public custody, but her family expressed privacy considerations and sought to limit "voyeuristic gawking".

On behalf of the family, Jon L. Mills argued in court that disclosure of media by state agencies is equivalent to dissemination, based on the Nikki Catsouras photographs case, in which retrospective attempts to limit public access have not been fully successful. The confidentiality considerations turn on issues that resemble those in the case of the murder of Meredith Emerson in Georgia; the laws that Georgia and Florida enacted in response to these situations are similar.

=== Foundation ===
Brancheau's family created the Dawn Brancheau Foundation in her honor. The foundation is "dedicated to improving the lives of children and animals in need, inspiring others to follow their dreams, and promoting the importance of community service".

== See also ==
- Blackfish (film) - 2013 documentary about Tilikum, the orca in question, and about the greater controversy over captive orcas
- Death of Alexis Martínez – 2009 killing of an orca trainer in Spain
