= Shamus =

Shamus may refer to:

- Shamus (video game), a 1982 computer game from Synapse Software
- Shamus (film), a 1973 film starring Burt Reynolds
- Shamus Wong, a character from the children's book Tracey McBean
- Colloquial term for a private detective
- Shamus Award for best detective fiction
- Shamus Award (horse)

== People ==
- Shamus Culhane (1908–1996), American animator, film director and producer
- Shamus Khan (born 1978), American sociologist
- Shamus O'Brien (1907–1981), Scottish-American soccer player
- Gareb Shamus, CEO of Wizard Entertainment

== See also ==
- Shamu, SeaWorld's first killer whale (died 1971)
- Shamu (SeaWorld show), SeaWorld's contemporary killer whale shows
- Seamus (disambiguation)
- Sheamus (born 1978), Irish professional wrestler
- Shammes or Gabbai, a term for the sexton or caretaker of a synagogue
