= Seamus =

Seamus may refer to:

- Séamus, a Gaelic male given name

== Film and television ==
- Seamus (Family Guy), a character in the television series Family Guy
- Seamus, a pigeon in Cats & Dogs: The Revenge of Kitty Galore
- Seamus McFly, a character in Back to the Future Part III
- M/V Seamus (934TXS), a space salvage freighter, and the primary setting for Archer season 10, "Archer: 1999"

== Literature ==
- Seamus Finnigan, a character in the Harry Potter series
- Seamus Mellencamp, a character in Marvel Comics

== Music ==
- "Seamus" (song), the fifth song on Pink Floyd's 1971 album Meddle

== Other uses ==
- Society for Electro-Acoustic Music in the United States (SEAMUS)
- Seamus (dog), a dog belonging to U.S. presidential candidate Mitt Romney

== See also ==
- Sheamus (born 1978), Irish professional wrestler
- Shamus (disambiguation)
