= Paul Spong =

Canadian cetologist and neuroscientist (born 1939)

Spong at OrcaLab in 2003

Paul Spong OBC (born 1939) is a New Zealand-born Canadian cetologist and neuroscientist. He has been researching orcas (or killer whales) in British Columbia since 1967, and is credited with increasing public awareness of whaling, through his involvement with Greenpeace.

== Early life and studies ==
Spong was born in Auckland, New Zealand, in 1939. He spent his early life in Whakatāne on the northeast coast. He studied law and psychology at the University of Canterbury in Christchurch. In 1963, Spong became a graduate student in Donald B. Lindsley's laboratory in the Psychology Department at the University of California, Los Angeles (UCLA) He also worked in Ross Adey's Space Biology Lab in UCLA's Brain Research Institute. Spong's work included computer analyses of human brain wave patterns and tracking information pathways. Spong's doctoral thesis was on sensory stimulation, perception, and human consciousness.

== Early career ==
=== Vancouver Aquarium ===
In 1967, Murray Newman of the Vancouver Aquarium asked Patrick McGeer, head of the Neurological Lab at the University of British Columbia (UBC), to find a "whale scientist" to assist him. McGeer suggested Spong, who was hired to work with the aquarium's cetaceans, including the orca Skana, newly purchased from the Pacific Northwest Boat Show. Spong arrived in Vancouver with his wife Linda in April 1967.

Spong started his research by testing the vision of a dolphin named Diana. He determined that she could see underwater about as well as a cat can see in air. He then started testing Skana's eyesight, rewarding her with half a herring every time she correctly distinguished between one and two vertical lines displayed on cards dropped into slots on an apparatus. Skana's task was to press a lever beside the card with two lines. The gap between the lines was varied to determine when Skana could no longer discriminate it. She took many hundreds of trials to learn the initial discrimination and became a willing performer. Then, at a point when Skana was performing at 100% correct, she suddenly switched her behaviour and started pressing only the "wrong" lever. Her performance fell to 0% and stayed there for many days. After some thought, and finding no comparable report in behavioural literature, Spong concluded that the whale was giving wrong answers on purpose and trying to communicate something to him. It was one word: NO! This was the first breakthrough Paul had in understanding orcas.

In April 1968, a second orca, Hyak, was captured and brought to the Aquarium. Hyak was kept in a separate pool from Skana. After many months in isolation, Hyak had become sedentary, floating in one corner of his pool day and night. Spong decided to run an experiment to find out if an acoustic reward could be used to modify Hyak's behaviour. He placed an underwater speaker in one corner of the pool and connected it to audio equipment in his lab next door. A 3 kHz tone started a trial. If Hyak moved out of his corner, Spong turned on a reward sound. Soon, Hyak was swimming sedately around the pool. Spong then modified the reward criteria, essentially saying that anything except staying in one corner of the pool would be rewarded with sound. Soon, Hyak was an enthusiastic performer. Spong learned the importance of acoustics for orcas through these experiments. His experiments with music and sound helped Hyak's recovery from lethargy. When the Hyak and Skana were placed in the same pool, he observed that they vocalised together.

Among Spong's frequent interactions with the whales was an event involving Skana. Spong had developed a habit of going to the Aquarium in the early morning, before the public arrived and sitting on a little training platform dangling his bare feet in the water. Skana would come over to him and Spong would rub his feet over Skana's head and body. She seemed to enjoy that. One morning, Skana swam slowly towards him as usual; then when just a couple of inches away from Spong's feet suddenly opened her jaws and slashed them across Spong's feet, so close he could feel her teeth on the tops and bottoms of his feet. Naturally, Spong jerked his feet out of the water and sat trembling on the platform. After quite some time he calmed down enough to put his feet back into the water. Skana did it again and Spong reacted the same way. By now Spong was curious. What was Skana doing? They went through this circle 10 or 11 times, until finally Spong was able to leave his feet in the water while Skana slashed her teeth across them without reacting. And then, Skana stopped. In that moment, Spong realised with sudden insight that he was no longer afraid of Skana. She had quickly and efficiently de-conditioned Spong's fear of her immensely powerful jaws and teeth. Not only that, she had demonstrated that she was in total control of her body, and that she would not harm him. Spong came to regard this as a great gift from Skana to him, as he has not since experienced fear in the presence of an orca.

=== 1968 lecture ===
In 1968, Spong delivered a lecture at the University of British Columbia, describing his experience with the two whales at the Vancouver Aquarium. He described the whales as "highly intelligent, social animals" and advised that they should not be kept in captivity. He proposed transferring the whales to a semi-wild environment (such as Pender Harbour) in order to study them in their natural habitat. Spong also mentioned that humans could someday communicate with whales.

His comments from this lecture were published in local newspapers and interviews with radio stations were scheduled. However, Dr Newman from the Aquarium did not appreciate Spong's recommendation about freeing the whales. This pushed Newman to suspend the research project Spong was working on. Shortly afterwards, Spong's contract with the Aquarium came up for renewal. It was not renewed.

=== 1969 address ===
In June 1969, Spong gave an uninvited address to the Western Psychological Association in which he discussed his belief that taking psychedelic drugs helped him tune in to the whales' space and that this could help with orca–human communications

== Independent foundation ==
Spong then created a foundation named Killer Whale (Orcinus Orca) Foundation (KWOOF). One of its aims was to stop whale captures in British Columbia. In December 1969, Spong travelled to Pender Harbour, where fishermen had captured 12 whales. Of the 12 whales, only one whale, Corky, has survived in captivity for more than 50 years. Spong has spent over three decades trying to free her.

== OrcaLab ==
In the summer of 1970, Spong established the OrcaLab on Hanson Island. The research station is located about 200 miles northwest of Vancouver on Blackney Pass. Orca families travel through the pass towards Johnstone Strait where they feast on migrating salmon, socialise with other pods of their community, and visit special "rubbing beaches". Hanson Island was an ideal place to study orcas in their natural habitat.

At the laboratory, Spong started to monitor and record the modulations and songs sung by the whales with a hydrophone hung over a convenient rocky shelf in the bay and connected to a tape recorder. Eventually OrcaLab created a network of hydrophones that covered 50 square kilometres (19 sq mi) of ocean that became recognised as critical habitat for the Northern Resident orca community. At first the hydrophone signals were transmitted to the Lab by VHF radio, then by wireless microwave network. The operational philosophy of OrcaLab as a land based research station is "learning without interference".

In 2000, Spong with Japanese colleagues set up an online portal for listening to the whales called "www.orca-live.net" which broadcast live sounds from OrcaLab's hydrophones via the Internet, making it possible for people around the world to hear the sounds of orcas. The project also included a link to live video cameras. Viewers could log in and chat to fellow orca enthusiasts. A sister site was set up in Japan to watch turtles under the Nature Network banner. The turtle aspect of the project eventually ended, but the orca webcast continues. and has expanded in partnership with explore.org.

== Campaign to stop clearcut logging ==
In the 1980s, the forest of Hanson Island was threatened by clearcut logging. Spong with his wife Helena Symonds and many allies including the 'Namgis First Nation mounted a campaign that opposed the logging. Hundreds of letters from people around the world, including many from Europe and Japan, were written to the British Columbia government. The logging company ownership changed. At one point, Spong travelled to New Zealand to appeal to the chairman of the new owner, Fletcher Challenge. Eventually, the forest of Hanson Island was protected under negotiations between the BC government, First Nations, environmental groups and logging companies that established the Great Bear Rainforest. Today it is managed by the Yukusam Heritage Society which includes representatives from three First Nations whose territory includes Hanson Island. OrcaLab's work continues under license from the Society. Yulusam is the traditional name of Hanson Island.

== Campaign to stop commercial whaling ==
In 1972, Spong met Farley Mowat, who was on a national tour promoting his book A whale for the killing. Mowat convinced Spong of the desperate plight faced by many species of great whales. Spong with his wife Linda began a campaign as the Canadian branch of Project Jonah aimed at convincing Canada to stop whaling. Within a year, Canada did so.

Spong set his sights higher and convinced Greenpeace, at the time an anti-nuclear testing organisation, to take up the whales' cause. Vancouver Sun columnist Bob Hunter and other Greenpeacers formed the Stop Ahab committee of Greenpeace and set about planning to confront whalers on the high seas. In 1973, Spong and Hunter put on the Christmas Whale Show at Vancouver's Queen Elizabeth Theatre to raise funds for a trip to Japan aimed at convincing that country to stop whaling. Canadian musician Gordon Lightfoot called during the show and pledged $5,00 to support the effort. In 1974, Spong and his family travelled to Japan and made presentations at 21 venues that included theatres in shopping malls and schools. Spong also met with whaling industry and government officials. These efforts unsuccessful, Spong returned to Canada convinced of the need to confront the whalers directly.

In 1975, Spong and his family took the re-named Greenpeace Whale Show across Canada, then to Iceland and Norway. In Norway, they visited the Bureau of International Whaling statistics where Spong, presenting himself as a whale scientist interested in sperm whales, obtained access to whalers' log books showing the locations of whaling operations off the coast of California. When Hunter received this information he knew where to head but kept the information to himself until close to the time the Russian whaling fleet would be off the coast of California. The Phyllis Cormack headed there in July, confronting the whalers off Mendocino. A dramatic scene showing a harpoon flying over the heads of Hunter and Paul Watson in a tiny zodiac was aired on Walter Cronkite's CBS evening news show just before the International Whaling Commission (IWC) met in London.

The result was a dramatic uplift in public awareness of the whaling issue and pressure on the IWC, which was essentially a whalers' club at that point. Spong by happenstance managed to attend the IWC meeting, and subsequently was able to attend meetings of its Scientific Committee and plenary meetings of the Commission as an NGO observer, one of many whose aim was to end commercial whaling.

In 1982, the International Whaling Commission voted by 3/4 majority to impose a moratorium on commercial whaling. The moratorium came into effect in 1986 and still stands today.

== Campaign to free Corky ==
In 1990, Switzerland's Bellerive Foundation hosted a conference to discuss cetaceans in captivity. Spong presented information about the Northern Resident A5 pod member named Corky (A16) and suggested her as a candidate for release back into the wild, where her family was well known. Corky had been captured in Pender Harbour, British Columbia, in 1969 and taken to Marineland of the Pacific, then to SeaWorld San Diego. An international campaign followed, highlighted by appeals to Sea World from children from 21 countries who contributed painted patches that were turned into a huge banner nearly 2 km long. Corky's FREEDOM BANNER was the inspiration of Austria's Niki Entrup. It was displayed around Sea World, in European capitals, and in western US states and British Columbia. Sea World remained obstinate in refusing to consider releasing Corky. In 2000 Corky's mother Stripe (A23) died, ending the opportunity for them to meet again. The campaign to Free Corky continued and presently involves creation of the Double Bay Sanctuary on Hanson Island as Corky's retirement home where ideally she would be cared for by the Sea World staff she knows well. Owner of the old Double Bay lodge Michael Reppy, who is building the Sanctuary, has the support of the ‘Namgis First Nation as well as Spong. Corky is still alive (as of July 2022) so she still has a chance to meet her family again.

== Personal life ==
Paul Spong is married to Helena Symonds, co-director of the OrcaLab, and widely published in her own right.

=== Maplewood Mudflats ===
In 1972, Spong was living in a hippie commune in North Vancouver, called the "Maplewood Mudflats". The District of North Vancouver wanted to turn the mudflats into a shopping centre. Spong led the opposition to the proposal. He was interviewed about the community in a film made for the National Film Board of Canada, by Robert Fresco and Kris Paterson, called Mudflats Living (1972). Another film was made by Seattle film maker Sean Malone called Living on the Mud. Eventually the squatters were evicted and their homes burned, the mudflats ultimately becoming a wildlife preserve, the Maplewood Flats Conservation Area.
