= Seattle Marine Aquarium =

- Interactive map of Seattle Marine Aquarium
- 47.6041774°N 122.3397052°W
- Date opened: June 22, 1962
- Date closed: September 12, 1977
- Location: Pier 56, Seattle, Washington, USA
- Land area: 6,000 square feet
- Volume of largest tank: 20,000 gallons
- Major exhibits: orcas, sixgill sharks, octopus

The Seattle Marine Aquarium (originally known as the Seattle Public Aquarium) was a privately owned aquarium that was opened in 1962 and closed in 1977, and was located on Pier 56 on the Elliott Bay waterfront in Seattle, Washington, USA.

== History ==
The aquarium opened on June 22, 1962, during the Century 21 Exposition and was initially owned and operated by Ted Griffin. At the time he hoped that his aquarium would be a "prelude" to a Marineland. The aquarium was a 6,000 square foot building. The staff consisted of skin-divers and volunteers. The curator was Eric Friese.

In 1965, the aquarium was contacted by Canadian fishermen who had accidentally trapped an orca. Ted Griffin thus acquired his first orca for $8,000, and named him Namu for the area where he was captured. Namu survived a year in Griffin's hands.

The aquarium closed on September 12, 1976, due to the forthcoming opening of the city-built Seattle Aquarium on Pier 59.

== Animals ==
=== Orcas ===
Under founder Ted Griffin, the aquarium was home to many orca whales captured in the wild. The orcas who were captive there were: Namu, Shamu, Katy, Kandu, Walter (briefly), and three unnamed orcas for a total 8 orcas over the years. Griffin paid $8,000 for Namu, who was captured in 1965. At the time, Namu was the world's only captive killer whale on display. He was 22 feet in length and weighed about four tons. Namu performed demonstrations for aquarium attendees.

Following the death of Namu, thousands of local fans wanted Griffin to get another orca. Aquariums all over the world also wanted Griffin to capture an orca for them. Consequently, Griffin planned large-scale orca capture operations, the first of which was the Yukon Harbor operation in 1967. As a result of this operation, for a brief period, no less than five (small) orcas were swimming together in the one tank at the aquarium.

=== Sharks ===
In 1964 the aquarium began to feature sixgill sharks. The sharks were taken from the Puget Sound at 500 feet deep, and were hooked with a long line. The line was tied to a buoy and dressed with ham, raw beef, and lingcod. After the sharks were captured, they lost their appetite and motivation. Griffin entered the tank in a wetsuit to force-feed the sharks mackerel and to push them around. The sharks did not last long, but the presence of the sharks significantly increased aquarium attendance.

=== Homer the Octopus ===
Homer was the aquarium's 88 pound octopus. At the time it was a record for captured octopuses. The octopus was captured in the Puget Sound.

== Opposition ==
Protesters picketed the aquarium, due to its use of live orcas in exhibits.

== Notes ==
=== General references ===
- Colby, Jason M. (2018). Orca: how we came to know and love the ocean's greatest predator. Oxford: Oxford University Press. ISBN 9780190673116.
