= Ted Griffin (orca capturer) =

American aquarium owner and entrepreneur

- Born: Edward Irving Griffin; November 22, 1935 (age 90); Tacoma, Washington, USA
- Education: Colorado College
- Occupations: Aquarium owner, entrepreneur
- Employer: Seattle Marine Aquarium (1962–1972)
- Known for: Capturing, performing with, and selling orcas in the 1960s and 1970s

Edward Irving "Ted" Griffin (born November 22, 1935) is an American former aquarium owner and entrepreneur who was the first man to ever swim with a killer whale in a public exhibition, with the whale named Namu. He is best known for capturing, performing with, and selling a number of orcas during the late 1960s and early 1970s. Griffin owned the Seattle Marine Aquarium and captured the original Shamu, who was sold to SeaWorld.

== Orcas ==
=== Encounter with Moby Doll ===
Griffin was present when the first ever successful feeding of a captive orca occurred. He was curious when the rival Vancouver Aquarium succeeded in capturing and keeping a killer whale alive in captivity for the first time. He drove his runabout with his wife from Puget Sound to Vancouver on September 9, 1964 to take a look. This juvenile orca named Moby Doll had not been fed successfully after being captured on July 16. After that, "the captive whale fasted 54 days" and "became very noticeably thinner." Compared to orcas in the wild, Moby Doll appeared to Griffin to be "gaunt and lethargic."

On that same day, the feeding breakthrough occurred. Aquarium director Murray Newman gave the credit for the first feeding to Allan Williams, a lawyer and chairman of the West Vancouver Parks Commission, with Griffin following him. Griffin gives a different, more intriguing version of events, in which the hand-feeding the aquarium had been afraid of trying was initiated by himself.

"He noticed several live lingcod that aquarium staff had tied to strings," which was their cautious approach to feeding the orca. "He cut one fish loose and held it by the head, slapping its body on the water." The whale went up to him and took the fish out of his hand. Griffin's gesture "may have sparked recognition in the little whale," as it was closer to the style of prey-sharing characteristic of killer whale society.

The daily newspapers did not report in detail why Moby Doll's behavior changed. His main chronicler, the Vancouver Sun, only observed that, "Moby Doll finally got really hungry." It was evident in the following days, however, that aquarium staff had radically altered their approach to feeding the killer whale. And on the 14th, assistant curator Vince Penfold "simply held out each of 23 fish as Moby swam by...she opened her mouth and he dropped them in." When Murray Newman and Pat McGeer later wrote their scientific paper about Moby Doll, their description of his regular feeding behavior sounded like Griffin's. They also stated that after September 9, the killer whale "was fed by hand," except that on that day, "the whale was first observed to devour a fish suspended on a line" - the old method.

Irrespective of who was first or second, Griffin's experience of feeding Moby Doll was electrifying. It was a sign that a childhood dream of his could come true. He later wrote, "I wanted Moby Doll so much I considered stealing her." Indeed, the encounter made Griffin even more determined to have his own killer whale.

=== Namu ===
In June 1965, salmon fisherman William Lechkobit had set up a fishing net in the offing of the small cannery town of Namu, British Columbia. An anchor snapped off, causing the net to drift to another bay, where it trapped an orca. When he went to reclaim his missing net, Lechkobit was surprised to discover the captive animal, as orcas do not typically jump over nets. Lechkobit returned to port and decided to sell what he had inadvertently trapped. Lechkobit called Vancouver Aquarium to make a deal and stipulated a payment of $10,000 in cash. The aquarium could not comply as all of the banks were closed. The Seattle Marine Aquarium was then contacted and Ted Griffin purchased the orca for $8,000. Reguald "Curly" Marinas designed a cage to tow the orca, named Namu, 450 miles (720 km) in a floating pen to captivity in Seattle.

=== Seattle Marine Aquarium ===
Griffin owned the Seattle Marine Aquarium on the Elliott Bay waterfront in Seattle, which opened in 1962 and was originally known as the Seattle Public Aquarium (not to be confused with the contemporary Seattle Aquarium). Namu was only the third orca ever captured and was the first to perform and swim with a person for audiences. Namu survived just over one year in captivity and died in his pen on July 9, 1966. Griffin also captured the original Shamu in 1965 and leased (and eventually sold) her to SeaWorld in San Diego. Altogether, Griffin and his partner Don Goldsberry captured and sold about 30 orcas in and around Puget Sound between 1965 and 1972. They charged buyers $20,000 to $25,000 per captured orca. Their largest capture took place in August 1970, when they netted most of all three pods of the southern resident orca population. When activists attempted to cut the nets, four animals drowned, including three calves. Griffin and Goldsberry attempted to conceal the deaths by weighting and sinking the bodies, but months later the carcasses washed up. This operation also resulted in the capture of the orca Lolita, who died in captivity in Miami on August 18, 2023, and has been subject of petitions and legal actions to retire her to more natural life conditions.

=== Withdrawal from aquatic work ===
In May 1972, in response to rising regulation, Griffin retired from orca capture and sold his portion of the Seattle Marine Aquarium to Goldsberry, who soon after sold it to SeaWorld. In 1982 Griffin published Namu, Quest for the Killer Whale, an account of his time with Namu and the transformation of public views of killer whales.
