= Shamu (SeaWorld show) =

Former orca shows at SeaWorld parks

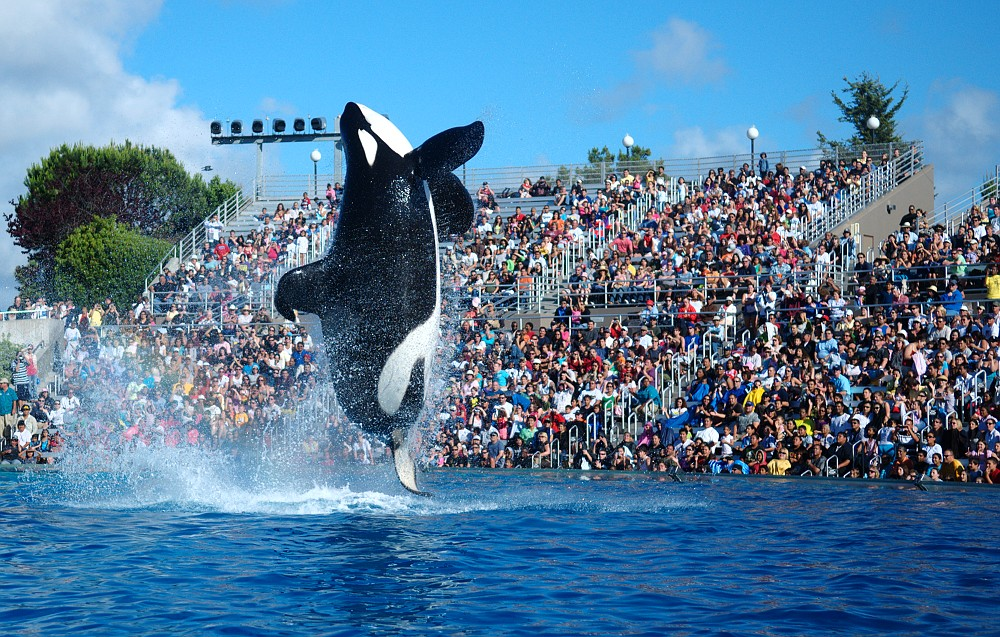
Ulises performing during the Shamu show at SeaWorld San Diego in 2009

Shamu was the stage name used for several performing orcas at SeaWorld.

The Shamu show began in the 1960s. The original Shamu died in 1971, but the name was trademarked by SeaWorld, and has been given to different orcas over the years.

In March 2016, following the 2010 death of orca trainer Dawn Brancheau, and subsequent public backlash from the 2013 documentary Blackfish, SeaWorld announced they would be ending their orca breeding program and phasing out their orca shows, instead opting to introduce "new, inspiring, natural orca encounters rather than theatrical shows…[focusing] on orca enrichment, exercise and overall health".

== History ==
In October 1965, a female juvenile orca was captured from the southern resident pod in Penn Cove, Puget Sound, Washington by Ted Griffin. After living at the Seattle Aquarium for two months, she was sold to SeaWorld San Diego in California. Shamu became the park's flagship performing orca until April 1971, when she attacked Anne Eckis, a SeaWorld employee who was told to ride her as part of a filmed publicity event, and refused to release the woman until other workers came to the rescue. Eckis suffered 18 to 20 wounds which required 100 to 200 stitches and left permanent scars. Shamu died four months later.

The first "Baby Shamu" was named Kalina. She was the first surviving orca born in captivity on September 26, 1985. Ten orca calves had been born in captivity before 1985, but five were stillborn and the others all died within two months of their births. Kalina died on October 4, 2010. The stage name "Grandbaby Shamu" was given to Kalina's first calf, a male named Keet, who was born on February 2, 1993. The "Great Grandbaby Shamu" was Keet's first calf, born on December 21, 2004 – a female named Kalia. Kalia gave birth to the first "Great Great Grandbaby Shamu" Amaya, on December 2, 2014. Amaya's father is Ulises. Amaya died on August 19, 2021.

== Incidents with performing orcas ==
- In April 1971, the original Shamu, a 17-foot female orca, bit and refused to let go of the leg of 22-year-old SeaWorld San Diego employee Anette Eckis, requiring her to be rescued by trainers and taken to the hospital for 100 to 200 stitches, which left permanent scarring.
- On February 23, 1984, a 7-year-old female orca by the name of Kandu V grabbed a SeaWorld San Diego trainer, Joanne Hay, and pinned her against a tank wall during a performance.
- On March 4, 1987, 20-year-old SeaWorld San Diego trainer Jonathan Smith was grabbed by one of the park’s six-ton orcas. The orca dragged the trainer to the very bottom of the tank, then carried him bleeding all the way back to the surface, and spat him out. Smith waved to the crowd in an attempt to maintain calm when a second orca slammed down on top of him. He continued to pretend he was unhurt as the whales repeatedly dragged him to the bottom of the stadium pool. Smith was cut around his torso, sustained a ruptured kidney, and a six-inch laceration to his liver, but he managed to escape the pool with his life. Later reports indicated that the whales involved in the attack were the 10-year-old female Kenau and the 9-year-old female Kandu V, who had previously attacked the trainer Joanne Hay in 1984.
- In November 1987, Orky II was involved in an accident that injured SeaWorld San Diego trainer John Sillick during a show for. Sillick was riding on the back of a female orca when Orky II breached. Sillick's back, leg, and pelvis were broken when Orky II landed on top of him. Sillick sued SeaWorld San Diego and received an out-of-court settlement, the details of which were under a gag order. According to Sillick's lawyer, after several operations, Sillick regained the ability to walk, but his activity was limited. Orky II may have been responding to what he perceived as another trainer's signal to breach. Court documents are sealed but the judge's remarks, which were not sealed, revealed that Orky II may have had "visual limitations" that had not been disclosed to the trainer.
- On June 12, 1999, 23-year-old Kasatka grabbed her trainer Kenneth Peters by the leg and attempted to throw him from the pool during a public show at SeaWorld San Diego.
- On July 6, 1999, 27-year-old Daniel P. Dukes was found dead, nude in a pool and draped over the back of the orca Tilikum. Although there was media speculation of hypothermia, the autopsy report said that the cause of death was drowning and that there was trauma. The man visited SeaWorld Orlando the previous day, remained after the park closed, and evaded security to enter the orca tank. A spokesman for the sheriff's office said, "There was no obvious signs of trauma to the body. He wasn't chewed. He wasn't dismembered." However, the coroner reported finding scrapes and bruises all over the body, some of which occurred after the victim died. The coroner also discovered more significant injuries, such as puncture wounds on the victim's leg, and his scrotum having been "ripped open". Divers also found small pieces of the victim's body at the bottom of the pool.
- In late July 2004, during a show at SeaWorld San Antonio, a male orca named Kyuquot repeatedly jumped on top of his trainer, Steve Aibel, forcing him underwater and barring the trainer from escaping the water. After several minutes, the trainer was able to calm the animal, and he exited the pool unhurt. "Veterinarians believe the whale… felt threatened by the trainer, perhaps a result of the effects of adolescent hormones."
- On April 4, 2005, SeaWorld Orlando trainer Sam Davis was repeatedly "bumped" by an 11-year-old male orca named Taku. The show continued uninterrupted, but the trainer was later taken to Sand Lake Hospital for unspecified minor injuries and released the same day. An additional eyewitness account reported "The trainer and Taku were about to slide on the slide out at the end of the show when Taku completely stopped and started 'bumping' the trainer. The trainer was male and he finally swam out of the tank. I knew something was wrong because none of the whales except Kalina wanted to perform. Then they finally got Taku out to splash people at the end of the show, when this incident took place."
- On November 15, 2006, a SeaWorld San Diego trainer was injured when the park's 18-year-old female orca, Orkid, grabbed veteran trainer Brian Rokeach by the foot and pulled him to the bottom of the tank, refusing to release him for an extended period of time. Orkid released Rokeach only after heeding fellow trainer Kenneth Peters's repeated attempts to call the animal’s attention back to the stage. Rokeach suffered a torn ligament in his ankle but was not taken to the hospital. In response to the incident, SeaWorld increased the number of trainers who must be available during performances and in water training to five staff members.
- On November 29, 2006, Kasatka, one of SeaWorld San Diego's then-seven orcas, grabbed her trainer, Kenneth Peters, by the foot and dragged him to the bottom of the tank twice during an evening show at Shamu Stadium. The senior trainer escaped only after staff members managed to separate the two with safety nets. This was the second documented incident of Kasatka attacking Peters; the first attack occurred in 1999.
- On February 24, 2010, towards the end of a "Dine with Shamu" show at SeaWorld Orlando, the orca Tilikum pulled down an experienced trainer. Dawn Brancheau, a 40-year-old with extensive training experience and 15 years of experience at the park, was attacked and drowned as at least two dozen tourists looked on from above a whale tank and from an underwater viewing area. Brancheau was finishing a show with Tilikum, the largest orca in SeaWorld's collection. Following this accident, trainers no longer enter the water with orcas at SeaWorld shows.

== See also ==
- List of individual cetaceans
