= Namu, British Columbia =

Human settlement in British Columbia, Canada

Coordinates: 51°52′N 127°52′W

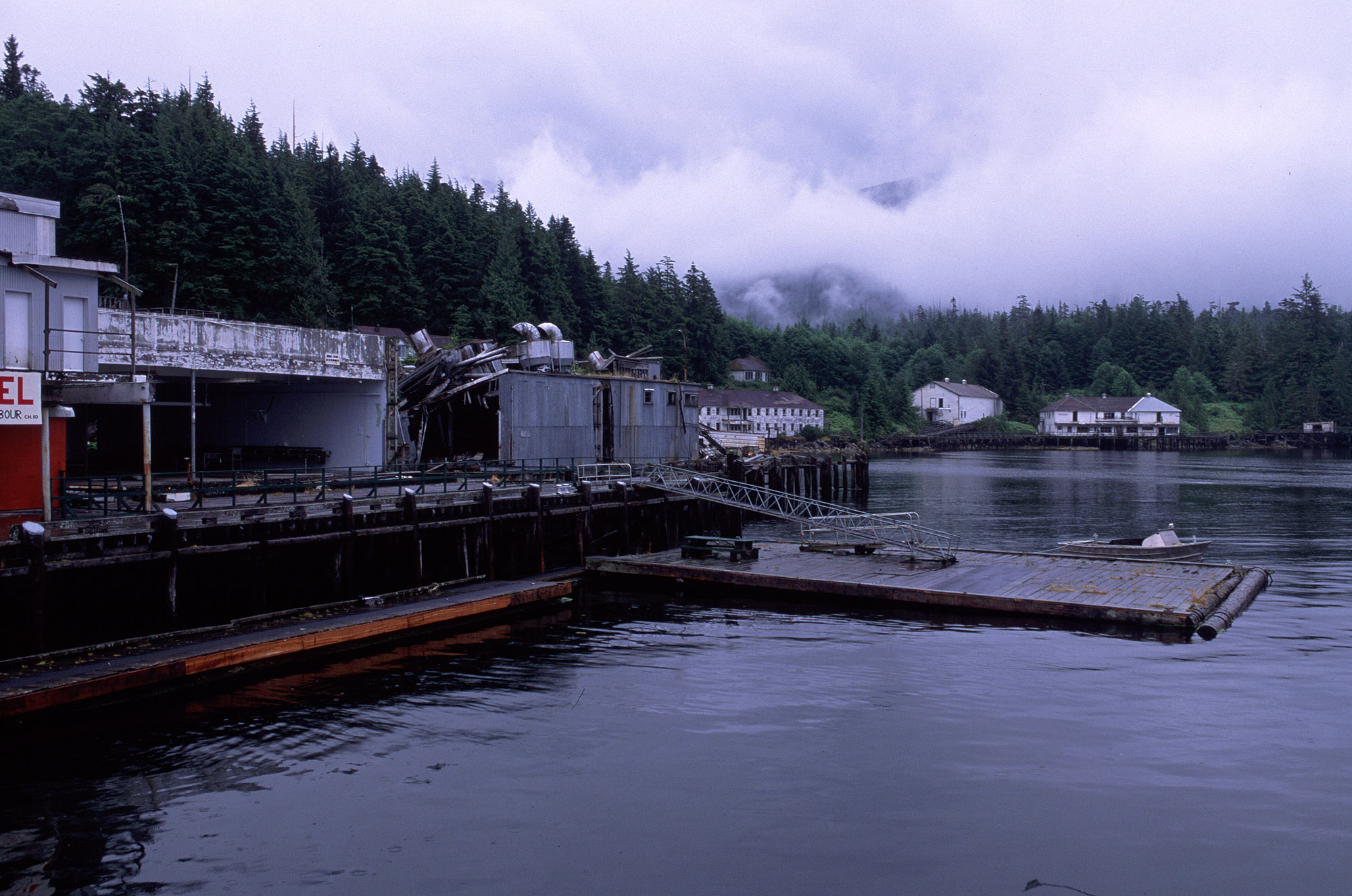
Namu Harbour

Namu is a small fishing port, former cannery town and First Nations community on the coast of British Columbia, Canada. It is located about 95 km (59.0 mi) southwest of Bella Coola or 35 km (21.7 mi) SSE of Bella Bella, on the mainland shore of the Inside Passage ferry route directly opposite Hunter Island, and just south of the opening of Burke Channel and King Island. The community's harbour is named Namu Harbour, and a large lake just inland is Namu Lake, which lies in the short drainage basin of the 15 km Namu River, immediately east of which is the small but rugged Namu Range.

Namu was the namesake of the killer whale Namu, who was captured nearby in 1965 and was the second orca ever displayed in captivity.

== Pre-contact history ==
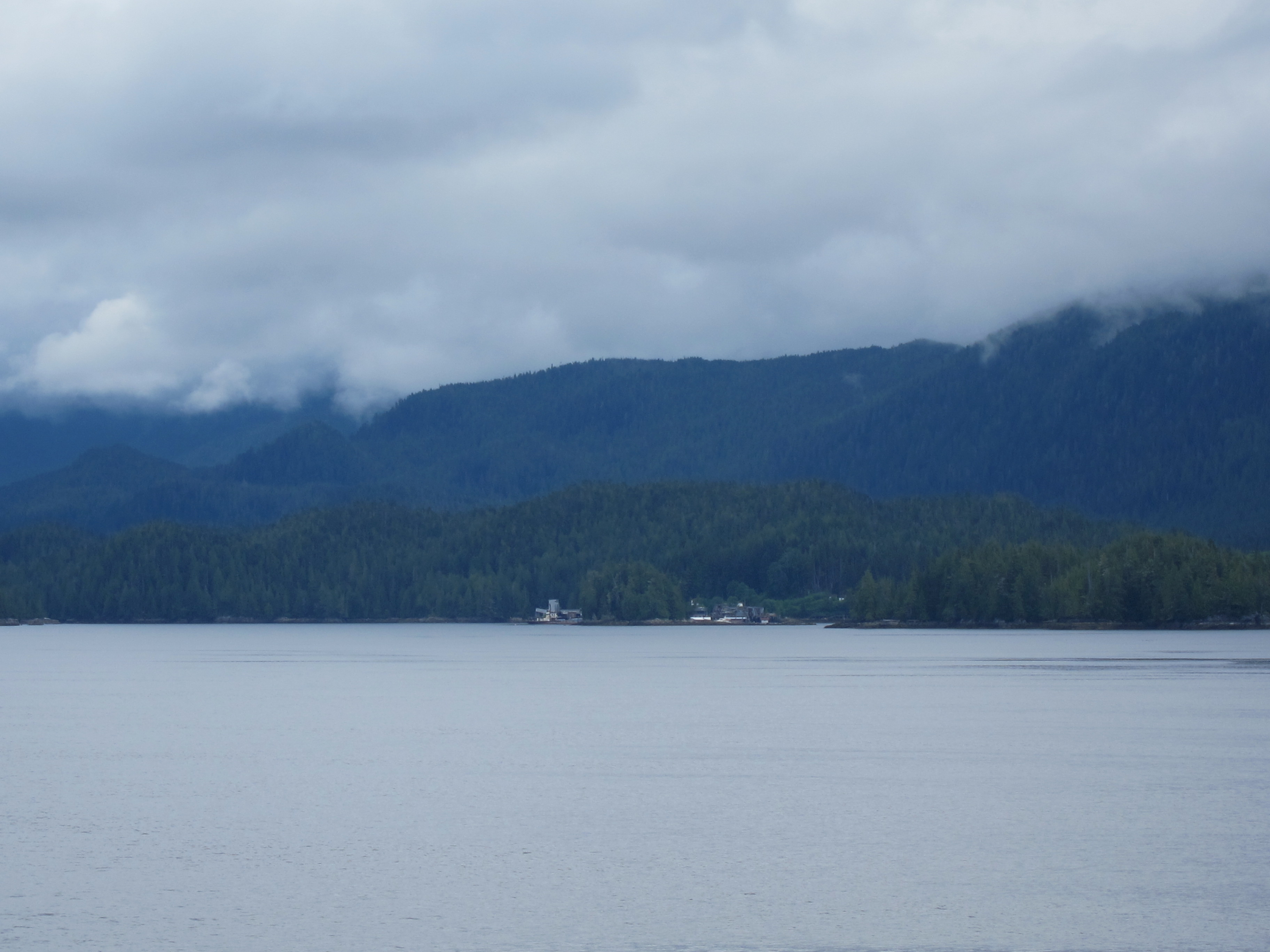
Namu and Fitz Hugh Sound

The site of Namu is one of the oldest known sites on the British Columbia coast. Marine hunters lived here 10,000-5800 (cal) BCE. Evidence from archaeological analysis from the early period at Namu indicate the full establishment of a broad-based marine economy as early as 6000 BP (4000BC). Microblades appear at Namu around 8250 BCE, the farthest south they were generally made and used along the coast. Elements of the more southerly pebble tool tradition also appear at Namu, which appears to have been at the interface of two regionally extensive lithic traditions.

There is no known evidence of large permanent houses, most likely due to rising sea levels along this unstable shore line. Deglaciation and the stabilization of rivers opened spawning grounds and likely led to the establishment of large salmon runs after 5800 (cal) BCE. Salmon fishing declined somewhat after 2500 BCE because of estuary development and river sedimentation. Still later, the stabilization of sea level led to the development of large tidal flats. People were thus able to add shellfish as a major food resource. This lasted until around 1250 BCE.

Shell middens are often where archaeologists identify organic remains, thanks to their alkaline content, which is a good natural preserver. At Namu, an important burial context has been recovered in the shell midden, dating c. 3400 BC. The presence of this hunter-gatherer cemetery is further evidence of a prolonged sedentism, a characteristic of complex hunter-gatherers. Various stone technologies have been identified at the Namu site. It consisted of celts, microblades and burnishing stones. Many of these tools were made out of materials found in the region such as antlers, bone and rocks.

== Climate ==
Climate data for Addenbroke Island (Note: Addenbroke Island is located approximately 28 kilometres (17.4 mi) south of Namu.) (1981–2010)
| Month | Jan | Feb | Mar | Apr | May | Jun | Jul | Aug | Sep | Oct | Nov | Dec | Year |
|---|---|---|---|---|---|---|---|---|---|---|---|---|---|
| Record high °C (°F) | 19.5 (67.1) | 17.5 (63.5) | 19.0 (66.2) | 21.5 (70.7) | 29.0 (84.2) | 31.0 (87.8) | 26.5 (79.7) | 28.5 (83.3) | 25.5 (77.9) | 21.5 (70.7) | 17.5 (63.5) | 17.5 (63.5) | 31.0 (87.8) |
| Mean daily maximum °C (°F) | 7.0 (44.6) | 7.6 (45.7) | 9.0 (48.2) | 11.2 (52.2) | 13.9 (57.0) | 16.1 (61.0) | 17.9 (64.2) | 18.3 (64.9) | 15.9 (60.6) | 12.0 (53.6) | 8.5 (47.3) | 7.0 (44.6) | 12.0 (53.7) |
| Daily mean °C (°F) | 4.7 (40.5) | 4.9 (40.8) | 6.1 (43.0) | 8.0 (46.4) | 10.6 (51.1) | 13.0 (55.4) | 14.9 (58.8) | 15.2 (59.4) | 13.0 (55.4) | 9.6 (49.3) | 6.2 (43.2) | 4.7 (40.5) | 9.2 (48.7) |
| Mean daily minimum °C (°F) | 2.2 (36.0) | 2.2 (36.0) | 3.2 (37.8) | 4.7 (40.5) | 7.3 (45.1) | 9.9 (49.8) | 11.8 (53.2) | 12.1 (53.8) | 10.1 (50.2) | 7.1 (44.8) | 3.8 (38.8) | 2.3 (36.1) | 6.4 (43.5) |
| Record low °C (°F) | −10.5 (13.1) | −15.0 (5.0) | −7.5 (18.5) | −0.5 (31.1) | 1.0 (33.8) | 5.0 (41.0) | 7.5 (45.5) | 7.8 (46.0) | 3.5 (38.3) | −7.0 (19.4) | −16.0 (3.2) | −10.5 (13.1) | −16.0 (3.2) |
| Average precipitation mm (inches) | 405.7 (15.97) | 266.1 (10.48) | 263.2 (10.36) | 236.1 (9.30) | 162.4 (6.39) | 158.0 (6.22) | 108.7 (4.28) | 138.2 (5.44) | 228.1 (8.98) | 432.0 (17.01) | 496.4 (19.54) | 367.4 (14.46) | 3,262.3 (128.43) |
| Average snowfall cm (inches) | 13.0 (5.1) | 16.8 (6.6) | 5.9 (2.3) | 1.8 (0.7) | 0.0 (0.0) | 0.0 (0.0) | 0.0 (0.0) | 0.0 (0.0) | 0.0 (0.0) | 0.7 (0.3) | 4.8 (1.9) | 14.5 (5.7) | 57.5 (22.6) |
| Average precipitation days (≥ 0.2 mm) | 22.8 | 19.3 | 22.3 | 20.9 | 18.3 | 17.4 | 14.5 | 15.9 | 17.5 | 23.5 | 24.2 | 23.5 | 240.1 |
| Average snowy days (≥ 0.2 cm) | 2.5 | 2.5 | 1.7 | 0.58 | 0.0 | 0.0 | 0.0 | 0.0 | 0.0 | 0.08 | 1.2 | 2.8 | 11.3 |
Source: Environment and Climate Change Canada

== See also ==
- Heiltsuk
- Heiltsuk Nation
- Nuxalk
- Nuxalk Nation
- List of canneries in British Columbia
