= Murray Newman (zoologist) =

American zoologist

Murray A. Newman (1924 – March 18, 2016) was an American-born Canadian public aquarium director, curator and zoologist. He served as the founding director of the Vancouver Aquarium for 37 years, from 1955 until his retirement in 1993. Newman oversaw the opening of the Vancouver Aquarium in June 1956. During his tenure, Newman championed research and conservation, areas that had not previously been a priority for staff at other aquariums. Newman, who had a firm interest in the Canadian Arctic, created field expeditions and research programs in the country's Far North which continue to the present day.

Newman was born and raised in Chicago, Illinois. He received a bachelor's degree in zoology from the University of Chicago and a master's degree, also in zoology, from the University of California, Berkeley, where he completed his thesis on the social behavior of brook trout and rainbow trout. He was hired as a museum zoologist as the University of California, Los Angeles after he completed his master's degree at Berkeley. He met his wife, Katherine, while teaching at UCLA. Katherine had enrolled as the only woman in a fish biology course, despite being warned that the professor disliked teaching women. She met Murray Newman, who was working as an assistant to the biology professor, during the course.
