= Namu (orca) =

Historic Seattle Public Aquarium orca

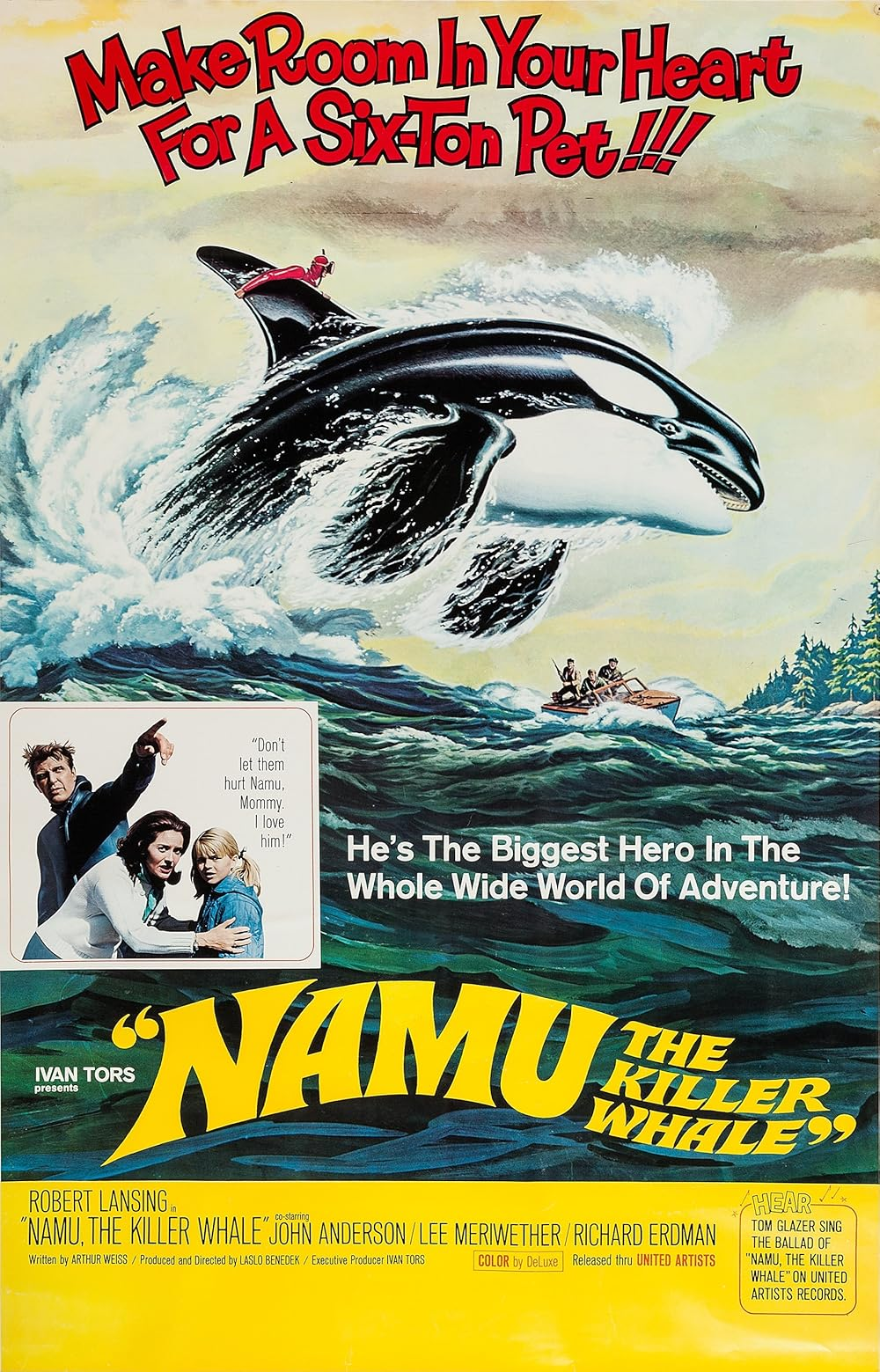
- Namu depicted on the film poster of Namu, the Killer Whale
- Species: Orca (Orcinus orca)
- Sex: Male
- Born: Unknown
- Died: July 9, 1966; Seattle Marine Aquarium
- Years active: 1965-1966
- Known for: First captive orca to perform with humans
- Named after: Fishing port of Namu

Namu (died July 9, 1966) was a male orca unintentionally captured in 1965 from the C1 Pod of the northern resident community. He was the first captive orca to perform with a human in the water. He was the subject of much media attention, including a starring role in the 1966 film Namu, the Killer Whale. Namu's captivity introduced thousands of people to orcas, and soon aquariums all over the world sought to establish captive orcas in their parks.

== History ==
In June 1965, William Lechkobit discovered a 22-foot (6.7m) male orca in his floating salmon net that had drifted close to shore near Namu, British Columbia. The orca was sold for $8,000 to Ted Griffin, owner of the Seattle Marine Aquarium; it ultimately cost Griffin much more to transport Namu 450 miles (720 km) south to Seattle.

While in captivity, Namu ate 400 pounds of salmon a day. Namu was a popular attraction at the Seattle Marine Aquarium, and Griffin soon captured a female orca to be a companion for Namu. The female, named Shamu, was quickly leased and eventually sold to SeaWorld in San Diego. Namu survived just over one year in captivity and died on July 9, 1966.

Griffin expressed mixed feelings when Namu died, saying he wished Namu had succeeded in a supposed "break for freedom" which had resulted in his death. The necropsy actually evidenced that he had been ill with an "acute bacterial infection, likely contracted from sewage runoff in Elliott Bay" where Griffin had moved him.

Nevertheless, thousands of local fans wanted Griffin to obtain another orca as did aquariums all over the world.

It was later discovered through preserved recordings of his calls that Namu was from C1 Pod, one of the best known northern resident orca pods in British Columbia. He was thus given the alphanumeric code C11. It is suspected that the matriarch, C5, who died in 1995, was his mother. As of February 2010, Namu's presumed sister Koeye (C10) is still alive.

The United Artists film Namu, the Killer Whale (a.k.a. Namu, My Best Friend) was released in 1966 and 'starred' Namu in a fictional story set in the San Juan Islands. The name "Namu" was also later used as a show-name for different orcas in SeaWorld shows.

== See also ==
- List of individual cetaceans
