= Shamu =

Captive female orca (died 1971)

- Species: Orca (Orcinus orca)
- Sex: Female
- Born: c. 1961
- Died: August 16, 1971; SeaWorld San Diego
- Years active: 1965–1971
- Known for: Namesake of the Shamu show

Shamu (/ʃæmuː/; c. 1961 – August 16, 1971) was a female orca captured in October 1965 from a southern resident pod. She was sold to SeaWorld San Diego and became a star attraction. Shamu was the fourth orca ever captured, and the second female. She died in August 1971, after about six years of captivity. After her death, the name Shamu continued to be used in SeaWorld "Shamu" shows for different orcas in different SeaWorld parks.

== Early life ==
Shamu was born sometime around 1961. She was the first-known intentional live capture of a healthy orca as the three previous captures (Wanda, Moby Doll and Namu) had been unintentional and opportunistic. The very young, 14-foot (4.3 m), 2,000-pound (910 kg) southern resident orca was captured by Ted Griffin off Penn Cove, Puget Sound, Washington in October 1965 to be a companion for the male orca Namu at Griffin's Seattle public aquarium. Her name means "Friend of Namu" (alternatively "She-Namu"). Shamu was successfully caught after her mother was killed with a harpoon. She was sold to SeaWorld in San Diego in December 1965.

== Captivity ==
Shamu was retired from performing after an incident on April 19, 1971, in which she bit the legs and hips of Annette Eckis, a SeaWorld employee who was told to ride her as part of a filmed publicity event. Shamu refused to release the woman until other workers came to the help of Annette and pried the orca's jaws apart with a pole. Eckis suffered 18 to 20 wounds which required from 100 to 200 stitches and left permanent scars. She was hospitalized five days and out of work several weeks. She also suffered some psychological disturbance. The employee had been asked to ride Shamu while wearing a bikini, and had not known that the orca had previously attacked people who wore ordinary bathing suits and was conditioned to perform only with trainers wearing wetsuits. Shamu had also been showing signs of erratic behavior and of being upset just before the incident.

Shamu died about four months later, on August 16, 1971.

== See also ==
- List of individual cetaceans
