= 1988 San Francisco 49ers season =

American football team season

- Owner: Eddie DeBartolo, Jr.
- General manager: John McVay
- Head coach: Bill Walsh
- Defensive coordinator: George Seifert
- Home stadium: Candlestick Park

Results
- Record: 10–6
- Division place: 1st NFC West
- Playoffs: Won Divisional Playoffs (vs. Vikings) 34–9; Won NFC Championship (at Bears) 28–3; Won Super Bowl XXIII (vs. Bengals) 20–16

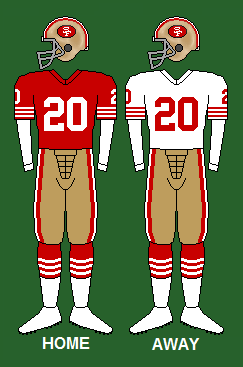
The uniform of the San Francisco 49ers, 1984-1988.

The 1988 season was the San Francisco 49ers' 39th in the National Football League (NFL), their 43rd overall, and their tenth and final season under head coach Bill Walsh. The 49ers won their third Super Bowl victory after a challenging regular season, with the team slipping to a 6–5 record in week 11. In danger of missing the playoffs for the first time since 1982, they defeated the Washington Redskins on a Monday night and won four of their last five regular season games, finishing the season 10–6 as NFC West champions. In the divisional round of the playoffs, they thrashed the Minnesota Vikings 34–9, gaining revenge over the team that had upset the #1-seeded 49ers at the same point in the previous season. They then defeated the Chicago Bears 28–3 in the NFC Championship game, braving a wind-chill factor of 26 degrees below zero.

Super Bowl XXIII marked the 49ers first Super Bowl appearance since they defeated the Miami Dolphins in Super Bowl XIX. They had made the playoffs in the three intervening seasons, but were eliminated each time in the first round, primarily because of the poor performances by their offensive stars in those games; quarterback Joe Montana, receiver Jerry Rice and running back Roger Craig all failed to produce a single touchdown.

The 49ers alternated quarterbacks, as Montana and Steve Young both started at various points of the season. The broadcast booth of the 49ers radio network also saw change, as Joe Starkey substituted for longtime 49ers play by play announcer Lon Simmons during several games, mostly in October when Simmons called the Oakland Athletics' 1988 American League Championship Series and 1988 World Series games for the Oakland A's flagship station, KSFO. The 1988 season was the last for Simmons as 49ers broadcaster. Across the regular season and postseason, the 49ers won just 13 games, then a record-low for Super Bowl champions. The number was matched in 2011 by the New York Giants, who also finished with a worse record: 13–7 (.650 win percentage), compared to the 49ers’ 13–6 (.684).

NFL Films produced a documentary about the team's season entitled State of the Art; it was narrated by Jeff Kaye. On March 8, 2007, NFL Network aired an episode of America's Game: The Super Bowl Champions about the 1988 49ers, with team commentary from Bill Walsh, Harris Barton and Roger Craig, and narrated by Ed Harris.

== Offseason ==
=== Draft ===
1988 San Francisco 49ers draft
| Round | Selection | Player | Position | College | Notes |
|---|---|---|---|---|---|
| 1 | 25 | Traded to the Los Angeles Raiders | | | |
| 2 | 33 | Danny Stubbs | DE | Miami (FL) | from Raiders |
| 2 | 39 | Pierce Holt | DE | Angelo State | from Eagles via Buccaneers |
| 2 | 53 | Traded to the Tampa Bay Buccaneers | | | |
| 3 | 80 | Bill Romanowski | LB | Boston College | |
| 4 | 102 | Barry Helton | P | Colorado | from Bears via Raiders |
| 4 | 107 | Traded to the Tampa Bay Buccaneers | | | |
| 5 | 131 | Traded to the New York Jets | | | |
| 5 | 135 | Traded to the Buffalo Bills | | | |
| 6 | 163 | Traded to the Tampa Bay Buccaneers | | | |
| 7 | 191 | Kevin Bryant | LB | Delaware State | |
| 8 | 219 | Larry Clarkson | OT | Montana | |
| 9 | 247 | Brian Bonner | LB | Minnesota | |
| 10 | 275 | Tim Foley | K | Georgia Southern | |
| 11 | 303 | Chet Brooks | DB | Texas A&M | |
| 12 | 331 | George Mira Jr. | LB | Miami (FL) | |

== Training Camp ==
The 1988 San Francisco 49ers season held training camp at Sierra College in Rocklin, California.

== Personnel ==
=== Staff ===
1988 San Francisco 49ers staff
| Front office: Owner/president – Edward J. DeBartolo, Jr.; Vice president/general counsel – Carmen Policy; Vice president/general manager – John McVay; Administrator of football operations – Neal Dahlen; Director of college scouting – Tony Razzano; Director of pro personnel – Allan Webb; Head coaches: Head coach – Bill Walsh; Offensive coaches: Offensive coordinator/quarterbacks – Mike Holmgren; Running backs – Sherman Lewis; Wide receivers – Dennis Green; Offensive line – Bobb McKittrick | Defensive coaches: Defensive coordinator – George Seifert; Defensive line – Fred von Appen; Linebackers – Bill McPherson; Defensive backs – Ray Rhodes; Defensive assistant – Tommy Hart; Special teams coaches: Special teams – Lynn Stiles; Strength and conditioning: Physical development coordinator – Jerry Attaway |

=== Roster ===
1988 San Francisco 49ers roster
| Quarterbacks (QB): 16 Joe Montana; 8 Steve Young; Running backs (RB): 33 Roger Craig; 25 Doug DuBose KR; 32 Terrence Flagler; 44 Tom Rathman FB; 35 Del Rodgers KR; 24 Harry Sydney; Wide receivers (WR): 83 Terry Greer; 80 Jerry Rice; 82 John Taylor; 85 Mike Wilson; Tight ends (TE): 86 John Frank; 89 Ron Heller; 84 Brent Jones | Offensive linemen (OL): 79 Harris Barton T; 69 Bruce Collie G; 51 Randy Cross C; 62 Guy McIntyre G; 77 Bubba Paris T; 61 Jesse Sapolu G; 60 Chuck Thomas C; 74 Steve Wallace T; Defensive linemen (DL): 95 Michael Carter NT; 75 Kevin Fagan DE; 78 Pierce Holt DE; 67 Pete Kugler NT; 91 Larry Roberts DE; 96 Danny Stubbs DE | Linebackers (LB): 50 Riki Ellison ILB; 55 Jim Fahnhorst ILB; 54 Ron Hadley OLB; 94 Charles Haley OLB; 57 Sam Kennedy ILB; 53 Bill Romanowski OLB; 99 Michael Walter ILB; Defensive backs (DB): 38 Greg Cox SS; 49 Jeff Fuller SS; 29 Don Griffin CB; 46 Tom Holmoe FS; 42 Ronnie Lott FS; 22 Tim McKyer CB; 20 Tory Nixon CB; 26 Darryl Pollard CB; 21 Eric Wright CB; Special teams (ST): 6 Mike Cofer K; 9 Barry Helton P | Reserve: 65 Jeff Bregel G (IR); 31 Chet Brooks CB/S (IR); 15 John Paye QB (IR); 90 Todd Shell LB (IR); 72 Jeff Stover DE (IR); 58 Keena Turner LB (IR); 27 Carlton Williamson S (IR); Rookies in italics 47 active, 7 reserve |

1988 Team Starters

Offense

- 16 Joe Montana QB
- 33 Roger Craig RB
- 44 Tom Rathman FB
- 85 Mike Wilson WR
- 80 Jerry Rice WR
- 89 John Frank TE
- 74 Steve Wallace LT
- 61 Jesse Sapolu LG
- 64 Randy Cross C
- 62 Guy McIntyre RG
- 79 Harris Barton RT

Defense

- 91 Larry Roberts
- 95 Michael Carter NT
- 75 Kevin Fagan
- 94 Charles Haley LB
- 50 Riki Ellison LB
- 99 Mike Walter LB
- 58 Keena Turner LB
- 22 Tim McKyer
- 21 Eric Wright
- 49 Jeff Fuller SS
- 42 Ronnie Lott FS

Kicking Team

- 6 Mike Cofer K
- 9 Barry Helton P
- 82 John Taylor PR
- 25 Doug DuBose KR

== Preseason ==
=== Schedule ===
| Week | Date | Opponent | Result | Record | Venue | Attendance | Recap |
|---|---|---|---|---|---|---|---|
| 1 | July 31 | Miami Dolphins | L 21–27 | 0–1 | (United Kingdom) Wembley Stadium (London) | 70,535 | Recap |
| 2 | August 6 | Los Angeles Raiders | W 24–10 | 1–1 | Candlestick Park | 64,457 | Recap |
| 3 | August 13 | at Denver Broncos | L 24–34 | 1–2 | Mile High Stadium | 75,067 | Recap |
| 4 | August 20 | at San Diego Chargers | W 34–27 | 2–2 | Jack Murphy Stadium | 39,044 | Recap |
| 5 | August 26 | Seattle Seahawks | W 27–21 | 3–2 | Candlestick Park | 53,357 | Recap |

== Preseason Game summaries ==
=== Week P1 (Sunday, July 31, 1988): vs. Miami Dolphins ===
Preseason Week 1: Miami Dolphins vs. San Francisco 49ers – Game summary

| Quarter | 1 | 2 | 3 | 4 | Total |
|---|---|---|---|---|---|
| Dolphins (1–0) | 7 | 6 | 7 | 7 | 27 |
| 49ers (0–1) | 0 | 14 | 7 | 0 | 21 |

at Wembley Stadium • London, England

- Date: July 31, 1988
- Game time: 10:00 a.m. PDT
- Game attendance: 70,535
- Referee: Gordon McCarter
- TV announcers (NBC): Dick Enberg (play–by–play) and Merlin Olsen (color commentator)

| Team | Category | Player | Statistics |
|---|---|---|---|
| MIA | Passing | | |
| MIA | Rushing | | |
| MIA | Receiving | | |
| SF | Passing | | |
| SF | Rushing | | |
| SF | Receiving | | |

Scoring summary

| Quarter | Time | Drive | | | Team | Scoring information | Score | |
| Quarter | Time | Plays | Yards | TOP | Team | Scoring information | MIA | SF |
|---|---|---|---|---|---|---|---|---|
| "TOP" = time of possession. For other American football terms, see Glossary of American football. | | | | | | | 27 | 21 |

- Point spread:
- Over/under:
- Time of game:

| Dolphins | Game statistics | 49ers |
|---|---|---|
| | First downs | |
| | Rushes–yards | |
| | Passing yards | |
| | Passes | |
| | Sacked–yards | |
| | Net passing yards | |
| | Total yards | |
| | Return yards | |
| | Punts | |
| | Fumbles–lost | |
| | Penalties–yards | |
| | Time of possession | |

=== Week P2 (Saturday, August 6, 1988): vs. Los Angeles Raiders ===
Preseason Week 2: Los Angeles Raiders at San Francisco 49ers – Game summary

| Quarter | 1 | 2 | 3 | 4 | Total |
|---|---|---|---|---|---|
| Raiders (0–1) | 3 | 0 | 0 | 7 | 10 |
| 49ers (1–1) | 3 | 14 | 3 | 0 | 20 |

at Candlestick Park • San Francisco, California

- Date: August 6, 1988
- Game time: 6:00 p.m. PDT
- Game attendance: 64,457
- TV announcers (CBS): Verne Lundquist (play-by-play) and John Madden (color commentator)

| Team | Category | Player | Statistics |
|---|---|---|---|
| RAI | Passing | | |
| RAI | Rushing | | |
| RAI | Receiving | | |
| SF | Passing | | |
| SF | Rushing | | |
| SF | Receiving | | |

Scoring summary

| Quarter | Time | Drive | | | Team | Scoring information | Score | |
| Quarter | Time | Plays | Yards | TOP | Team | Scoring information | RAI | SF |
|---|---|---|---|---|---|---|---|---|
| "TOP" = time of possession. For other American football terms, see Glossary of American football. | | | | | | | 10 | 24 |

- Point spread:
- Over/under:
- Time of game:

| Raiders | Game statistics | 49ers |
|---|---|---|
| | First downs | |
| | Rushes–yards | |
| | Passing yards | |
| | Passes | |
| | Sacked–yards | |
| | Net passing yards | |
| | Total yards | |
| | Return yards | |
| | Punts | |
| | Fumbles–lost | |
| | Penalties–yards | |
| | Time of possession | |

=== Week P3 (Saturday, August 13, 1988): at Denver Broncos ===
Preseason Week 3: San Francisco 49ers at Denver Broncos – Game summary

| Quarter | 1 | 2 | 3 | 4 | Total |
|---|---|---|---|---|---|
| 49ers (1–2) | 0 | 21 | 3 | 0 | 24 |
| Broncos (2–0) | 3 | 21 | 3 | 7 | 34 |

at Mile High Stadium • Denver, Colorado

- Date: August 13, 1988
- Game time: 6:00 p.m. PDT
- Game attendance: 75,067
- Referee: Ben Dreith
- TV announcers (KPIX-TV): Wayne Walker (play-by-play) and Bill Ring (color commentator)

| Team | Category | Player | Statistics |
|---|---|---|---|
| SF | Passing | | |
| SF | Rushing | | |
| SF | Receiving | | |
| DEN | Passing | | |
| DEN | Rushing | | |
| DEN | Receiving | | |

Scoring summary

| Quarter | Time | Drive | | | Team | Scoring information | Score | |
| Quarter | Time | Plays | Yards | TOP | Team | Scoring information | SF | DEN |
|---|---|---|---|---|---|---|---|---|
| "TOP" = time of possession. For other American football terms, see Glossary of American football. | | | | | | | 24 | 34 |

- Point spread:
- Over/under:
- Time of game:

| 49ers | Game statistics | Broncos |
|---|---|---|
| | First downs | |
| | Rushes–yards | |
| | Passing yards | |
| | Passes | |
| | Sacked–yards | |
| | Net passing yards | |
| | Total yards | |
| | Return yards | |
| | Punts | |
| | Fumbles–lost | |
| | Penalties–yards | |
| | Time of possession | |

=== Week P4 (Saturday, August 20, 1988): at San Diego Chargers ===
Preseason Week 4: San Francisco 49ers at San Diego Chargers – Game summary

| Quarter | 1 | 2 | 3 | 4 | Total |
|---|---|---|---|---|---|
| 49ers (2–2) | 7 | 3 | 3 | 21 | 34 |
| Chargers (1–2) | 10 | 10 | 7 | 0 | 27 |

at Jack Murphy Stadium • San Diego, California

- Date: August 20, 1988
- Game time: 6:00 p.m. PDT
- Game attendance: 39,044
- TV announcers (KPIX-TV): Wayne Walker (play-by-play) and Bill Ring (color commentator)

| Team | Category | Player | Statistics |
|---|---|---|---|
| SF | Passing | | |
| SF | Rushing | | |
| SF | Receiving | | |
| SD | Passing | | |
| SD | Rushing | | |
| SD | Receiving | | |

Scoring summary

| Quarter | Time | Drive | | | Team | Scoring information | Score | |
| Quarter | Time | Plays | Yards | TOP | Team | Scoring information | SF | SD |
|---|---|---|---|---|---|---|---|---|
| "TOP" = time of possession. For other American football terms, see Glossary of American football. | | | | | | | 34 | 27 |

- Point spread:
- Over/under:
- Time of game:

| 49ers | Game statistics | Chargers |
|---|---|---|
| | First downs | |
| | Rushes–yards | |
| | Passing yards | |
| | Passes | |
| | Sacked–yards | |
| | Net passing yards | |
| | Total yards | |
| | Return yards | |
| | Punts | |
| | Fumbles–lost | |
| | Penalties–yards | |
| | Time of possession | |

=== Week P5 (Friday, August 26, 1988): vs. Seattle Seahawks ===
Preseason Week 5: Seattle Seahawks at San Francisco 49ers – Game summary

| Quarter | 1 | 2 | 3 | 4 | Total |
|---|---|---|---|---|---|
| Seahawks (3–1) | 0 | 7 | 14 | 0 | 21 |
| 49ers (3–2) | 0 | 0 | 20 | 7 | 27 |

at Candlestick Park • San Francisco, California

- Date: August 26, 1988
- Game time: 6:00 p.m. PDT
- Game attendance: 53,357
- Referee: Pat Haggerty
- TV announcers (KPIX-TV): Wayne Walker (play-by-play) and Bill Ring (color commentator)

| Team | Category | Player | Statistics |
|---|---|---|---|
| SEA | Passing | | |
| SEA | Rushing | | |
| SEA | Receiving | | |
| SF | Passing | | |
| SF | Rushing | | |
| SF | Receiving | | |

Scoring summary

| Quarter | Time | Drive | | | Team | Scoring information | Score | |
| Quarter | Time | Plays | Yards | TOP | Team | Scoring information | SEA | SF |
|---|---|---|---|---|---|---|---|---|
| "TOP" = time of possession. For other American football terms, see Glossary of American football. | | | | | | | 21 | 27 |

- Point spread:
- Over/under:
- Time of game:

| Seahawks | Game statistics | 49ers |
|---|---|---|
| | First downs | |
| | Rushes–yards | |
| | Passing yards | |
| | Passes | |
| | Sacked–yards | |
| | Net passing yards | |
| | Total yards | |
| | Return yards | |
| | Punts | |
| | Fumbles–lost | |
| | Penalties–yards | |
| | Time of possession | |

== Regular season ==
In the 1988 season, San Francisco won the NFC West with a 10–6 regular season record, but it was a long uphill battle; the 49ers, Rams, and Saints all finished 10–6 with the 49ers winning the division on tiebreakers. The team had a quarterback controversy with Montana and Steve Young each starting at quarterback during the season. But after a 6–5 start, Montana led the 49ers to win 4 of their final 5 regular season games.

Montana finished the regular season with 238 completions for 2,981 yards and 18 touchdowns, and also added 132 rushing yards. His favorite target was Rice, who recorded 64 receptions for 1,306 yards (a 20.4 yards per catch average) and 9 touchdowns. Craig was also a key contributor with a total of 2,036 combined rushing and receiving yards and 10 touchdowns, earning him the NFL Offensive Player of the Year Award. Fullback Tom Rathman also made a big impact, rushing for 427 yards and catching 42 passes for 387 yards. The 49ers defense was led by defensive backs Ronnie Lott, Eric Wright, Jeff Fuller, and Tim McKyer, who recorded a combined total of 18 interceptions. McKyer led the team with 7, while Lott recorded 5. Linebacker Charles Haley was also a big contributor with 11.5 sacks and 2 fumble recoveries.

=== Schedule ===
| Week | Date | Opponent | Result | Record | Venue | Attendance | Recap |
|---|---|---|---|---|---|---|---|
| 1 | September 4 | at **New Orleans Saints** | **W** 34–33 | 1–0 | Louisiana Superdome | 66,357 | Recap |
| 2 | September 11 | at New York Giants | **W** 20–17 | 2–0 | Giants Stadium | 75,943 | Recap |
| 3 | September 18 | **Atlanta Falcons** | **L** 17–34 | 2–1 | Candlestick Park | 60,168 | Recap |
| 4 | September 25 | at Seattle Seahawks | **W** 38–7 | 3–1 | Kingdome | 62,382 | Recap |
| 5 | October 2 | Detroit Lions | **W** 20–13 | 4–1 | Candlestick Park | 58,285 | Recap |
| 6 | October 9 | Denver Broncos | **L** 13–16 (OT) | 4–2 | Candlestick Park | 61,711 | Recap |
| 7 | October 16 | at **Los Angeles Rams** | **W** 24–21 | 5–2 | Anaheim Stadium | 65,450 | Recap |
| 8 | October 24 | at Chicago Bears | **L** 9–10 | 5–3 | Soldier Field | 65,293 | Recap |
| 9 | October 30 | Minnesota Vikings | **W** 24–21 | 6–3 | Candlestick Park | 60,738 | Recap |
| 10 | November 6 | at Phoenix Cardinals | **L** 23–24 | 6–4 | Sun Devil Stadium | 64,544 | Recap |
| 11 | November 13 | Los Angeles Raiders | **L** 3–9 | 6–5 | Candlestick Park | 54,448 | Recap |
| 12 | November 21 | Washington Redskins | **W** 37–21 | 7–5 | Candlestick Park | 59,268 | Recap |
| 13 | November 27 | at San Diego Chargers | **W** 48–10 | 8–5 | Jack Murphy Stadium | 51,484 | Recap |
| 14 | December 4 | at **Atlanta Falcons** | **W** 13–3 | 9–5 | Atlanta–Fulton County Stadium | 44,048 | Recap |
| 15 | December 11 | **New Orleans Saints** | **W** 30–17 | 10–5 | Candlestick Park | 62,977 | Recap |
| 16 | December 18 | **Los Angeles Rams** | **L** 16–38 | 10–6 | Candlestick Park | 62,444 | Recap |
Note: Intra-division opponents are in **bold** text.

== Regular season game summaries ==
=== Week 1 (Sunday, September 4, 1988): at New Orleans Saints ===
Week 1: San Francisco 49ers at New Orleans Saints – Game summary

| Quarter | 1 | 2 | 3 | 4 | Total |
|---|---|---|---|---|---|
| 49ers (1–0) | 7 | 3 | 21 | 3 | 34 |
| Saints (0–1) | 7 | 10 | 0 | 16 | 33 |

at Louisiana Superdome • New Orleans, Louisiana

- Date: September 4, 1988
- Game time: 10:01 a.m. PDT
- Game weather: indoors
- Game attendance: 66,357
- Referee: Jerry Markbreit
- TV announcers (CBS): Verne Lundquist (play–by–play) and John Madden (color commentator)

| Team | Category | Player | Statistics |
|---|---|---|---|
| SF | Passing | Joe Montana | 13/23, 161 YDS, 3 TDs, 1 INT |
| SF | Rushing | Roger Craig | 18 CAR, 67 YDS, 1 TD |
| SF | Receiving | Roger Craig | 5 REC, 43 YDS |
| NO | Passing | Bobby Hebert | 22/31, 245 YDS, 4 TDs, 2 INTs |
| NO | Rushing | Dalton Hilliard | 19 CAR, 95 YDS |
| NO | Receiving | Lonzell Hill | 7 REC, 74 YDS, 1 TD |

Scoring summary

| Quarter | Time | Drive | | | Team | Scoring information | Score | |
| Quarter | Time | Plays | Yards | TOP | Team | Scoring information | SF | NO |
|---|---|---|---|---|---|---|---|---|
| 1 | 8:41 | 13 | 70 | | 49ers | Craig 1-yard touchdown run, Cofer kick good | 7 | 0 |
| 1 | 1:24 | 12 | 67 | | Saints | Martin 2-yard touchdown reception from Hebert, Andersen kick good | 7 | 7 |
| 2 | 14:55 | 3 | 28 | | Saints | Clark 21-yard touchdown reception from Hebert, Andersen kick good | 7 | 14 |
| 2 | 8:47 | 7 | 24 | | Saints | 20-yard field goal by Andersen | 7 | 17 |
| 2 | 6:55 | 6 | 51 | | 49ers | 25-yard field goal by Cofer | 10 | 17 |
| 3 | 11:05 | 4 | 49 | | 49ers | Frank 9-yard touchdown reception from Montana, Cofer kick good | 17 | 17 |
| 3 | 8:05 | 5 | 35 | | 49ers | Wilson 71-yard touchdown reception from Montana, Cofer kick good | 24 | 17 |
| 3 | 3:07 | 6 | 42 | | 49ers | Frank 17-yard touchdown reception from Montana, Cofer kick good | 31 | 17 |
| 4 | 13:26 | 10 | 79 | | Saints | Hill 18-yard touchdown reception from Hebert, Andersen kick good | 31 | 24 |
| 4 | 6:33 | – | – | – | Saints | Swilling tackled Young in end zone for a safety | 31 | 26 |
| 4 | 1:50 | 9 | 29 | | 49ers | 32-yard field goal by Cofer | 34 | 26 |
| 4 | 0:21 | 8 | 70 | | Saints | Perriman 15-yard touchdown reception from Hebert, Andersen kick good | 34 | 33 |
| "TOP" = time of possession. For other American football terms, see Glossary of American football. | | | | | | | 34 | 33 |

- Point spread: 49ers Pick'em
- Over/under: 43.0 (over)
- Time of game: 3 hours, 7 minutes

| 49ers | Game statistics | Saints |
|---|---|---|
| 21 | First downs | 23 |
| 32–124 | Rushes–yards | 31–147 |
| 165 | Passing yards | 245 |
| 14–26–1 | Passes | 22–31–2 |
| 0–0 | Sacked–yards | 5–48 |
| 165 | Net passing yards | 197 |
| 289 | Total yards | 344 |
| 128 | Return yards | 310 |
| 1–24.0 | Punts | 3–40.0 |
| 1–1 | Fumbles–lost | 2–1 |
| 2–12 | Penalties–yards | 10–77 |
| 23:50 | Time of possession | 36:10 |

Starting Lineups

| Position | Starting Lineups – Week 1: at New Orleans |
|---|---|
Offense
| QB | #16 Joe Montana |
| RB | #33 Roger Craig |
| FB | #44 Tom Rathman |
| WR | #80 Jerry Rice |
| WR | #89 Wes Chandler |
| TE | #86 John Frank |
| LT | #74 Steve Wallace |
| LG | #61 Jesse Sapolu |
| C | #51 Randy Cross |
| RG | #62 Guy McIntyre |
| RT | #79 Harris Barton |
Defense
| LDE | #91 Larry Roberts |
| NT | #95 Michael Carter |
| RDE | #75 Kevin Fagan |
| LOLB | #94 Charles Haley |
| LILB | #50 Riki Ellison |
| RILB | #99 Mike Walter |
| ROLB | #53 Bill Romanowski |
| LCB | #22 Tim McKyer |
| RCB | #29 Don Griffin |
| SS | #49 Jeff Fuller |
| FS | #42 Ronnie Lott |

Individual stats

49ers Passing
| | C/ATT^{1} | Yds | TD | INT | Sk | Yds | LG^{3} | Rate |
|---|---|---|---|---|---|---|---|---|
| Montana | 13/23 | 161 | 3 | 1 | 0 | 0 | 29 | 99.8 |
| Young | 1/3 | 4 | 0 | 0 | 0 | 0 | 4 | 42.4 |

49ers Rushing
| | Car^{2} | Yds | TD | LG^{3} |
|---|---|---|---|---|
| Craig | 18 | 67 | 1 | 10 |
| Rice | 2 | 29 | 0 | 29 |
| Montana | 3 | 20 | 0 | 10 |
| Rathman | 8 | 10 | 0 | 5 |
| Young | 1 | –2 | 0 | –2 |

49ers Receiving
| | Rec^{4} | Yds | TD | LG^{3} |
|---|---|---|---|---|
| Frank | 5 | 59 | 2 | 17 |
| Craig | 5 | 43 | 0 | 14 |
| Rice | 2 | 41 | 0 | 29 |
| Wilson | 1 | 17 | 1 | 17 |
| Rathman | 1 | 5 | 0 | 5 |

49ers Kick Returns
| | Ret | Yds | Y/Rt | TD | Lng |
|---|---|---|---|---|---|
| DuBose | 4 | 105 | 26.3 | 0 | 0 |

49ers Punt Returns
| | Ret | Yds | Y/Rt | TD | Lng |
|---|---|---|---|---|---|
| Griffin | 2 | 18 | 9.0 | 0 | 0 |

49ers Punting
| | Pnt | Yds | Y/P | Lng | Blck |
|---|---|---|---|---|---|
| Runager | 1 | 24 | 24.0 | 24 | 1 |

49ers Kicking
| | XPM–XPA | FGM–FGA |
|---|---|---|
| Cofer | 4–4 | 2–2 |

49ers Sacks
| | Sacks |
|---|---|
| Carter | 2.0 |
| Fagan | 1.0 |
| Haley | 1.0 |
| Roberts | 1.0 |

49ers Interceptions
| | Int | Yds | TD | LG | PD |
|---|---|---|---|---|---|
| Lott | 1 | 11 | 0 | 11 | 0 |
| Carter | 1 | 0 | 0 | 0 | 0 |

The Saints, fresh off the first winning season in franchise history, clawed to a 17–10 halftime lead in the second quarter, but Joe Montana erupted in the third with three touchdown throws. Head coach Bill Walsh, wanting to get playing time for backup Steve Young, put Young in for the fourth quarter; Young was sacked in the endzone for a safety and the Saints scored seven more points after that, nonetheless coming up short 34–33 to the 49ers.

=== Week 2 (Sunday, September 11, 1988): at New York Giants ===
Week 2: San Francisco 49ers at New York Giants - Game summary

| Quarter | 1 | 2 | 3 | 4 | Total |
|---|---|---|---|---|---|
| 49ers (2–0) | 0 | 10 | 3 | 7 | 20 |
| Giants (1–1) | 7 | 3 | 0 | 7 | 17 |

at Giants Stadium • East Rutherford, New Jersey

- Date: September 11, 1988
- Game time: 10:00 a.m. PDT
- Game weather: 63 °F (17 °C); wind 5 (partly sunny)
- Game attendance: 75,943
- Referee: Gordon McCarter
- TV announcers (CBS): Verne Lundquist (play–by–play) and John Madden (color commentator)

| Team | Category | Player | Statistics |
|---|---|---|---|
| SF | Passing | Joe Montana | 10/18, 148 YDS, 1 TD |
| SF | Rushing | Roger Craig | 18 CAR, 110 YDS |
| SF | Receiving | Roger Craig | 9 REC, 69 YDS |
| NYG | Passing | Phil Simms | 21/37, 227 YDS, 2 TDs |
| NYG | Rushing | Joe Morris | 22 CAR, 67 YDS |
| NYG | Receiving | Lionel Manuel | 6 REC, 80 YDS, 2 TDs |

Scoring summary

| Quarter | Time | Drive | | | Team | Scoring information | Score | |
| Quarter | Time | Plays | Yards | TOP | Team | Scoring information | SF | NYG |
|---|---|---|---|---|---|---|---|---|
| 1 | 11:12 | 4 | 30 | | Giants | Manuel 12-yard touchdown reception from Simms, Allegre kick good | 0 | 7 |
| 2 | 14:51 | 8 | 39 | | 49ers | 35-yard field goal by Cofer | 3 | 7 |
| 2 | 9:18 | 10 | 57 | | 49ers | DuBose 1-yard touchdown run, Cofer kick good | 10 | 7 |
| 2 | 0:09 | 13 | 52 | | Giants | 36-yard field goal by Allegre | 10 | 10 |
| 3 | 7:51 | 12 | 50 | | 49ers | 26-yard field goal by Cofer | 13 | 10 |
| 4 | 1:21 | 2 | 15 | | Giants | Manuel 15-yard touchdown reception from Simms, Allegre kick good | 13 | 17 |
| 4 | 0:42 | 3 | 77 | | 49ers | Rice 78-yard touchdown reception from Montana, Cofer kick good | 20 | 17 |
| "TOP" = time of possession. For other American football terms, see Glossary of American football. | | | | | | | 20 | 17 |

- Point spread: 49ers +2
- Over/under: 44.0 (under)
- Time of game: 3 hours, 13 minutes

| 49ers | Game statistics | Giants |
|---|---|---|
| 25 | First downs | 17 |
| 33–181 | Rushes–yards | 29–112 |
| 263 | Passing yards | 227 |
| 21–37–0 | Passes | 21–37–0 |
| 3–14 | Sacked–yards | 3–30 |
| 249 | Net passing yards | 197 |
| 430 | Total yards | 309 |
| 63 | Return yards | 133 |
| 4–39.0 | Punts | 5–39.2 |
| 4–2 | Fumbles–lost | 2–0 |
| 9–97 | Penalties–yards | 4–30 |
| 30:46 | Time of possession | 29:14 |

Individual stats

- Passing: Montana – 10/18, 148 YDS, 1 TD; Young – 11/18, 115 YDS; Rice – 0/1, 0 YDS
- Rushing: Craig – 18 CAR, 110 YDS; Young – 5 CAR, 48 YDS; – Rathman – 6 CAR, 21 YDS; DuBose – 3 CAR, 2 YDS, 1 TD; Montana – 1 CAR, 0 YDS
- Receiving: Craig – 9 REC, 69 YDS; Rice – 4 REC, 109 YDS, 1 TD; Rathman – 3 REC, 27 YDS; Wilson – 2 REC, 25 YDS; Heller – 2 REC, 24 YDS; Chandler – 1 REC, 9 YDS
- Kickoff returns: DuBose – 3 KR, 49 YDS
- Punt returns: Chandler – 2 PR, 14 YDS
- Punting: Helton – 4 PUNTS, 156 YDS
- Kicking: Cofer – 2/2 PAT, 2/4 FG
- Sacks: Fagan – 1.0; Haley – 1.0; Roberts – 1.0
- 49ers Missed Field Goals: Cofer 62, 35

Concerned over Montana's health, coach Walsh started Steve Young in his place against the Giants; Young's rawness to the Niners offensive system showed as he was limited to 115 yards passing and the Niners trailed 17–13 in the fourth. Montana came in and fired a 77-yard touchdown in the final minutes to Jerry Rice and a 20–17 Niners win (the play, 76 All Go, had only bern installed that week).

=== Week 3 (Sunday, September 18, 1988): vs. Atlanta Falcons ===
Week 3: Atlanta Falcons at San Francisco 49ers – Game summary

| Quarter | 1 | 2 | 3 | 4 | Total |
|---|---|---|---|---|---|
| Falcons (1–2) | 0 | 21 | 3 | 10 | 34 |
| 49ers (2–1) | 3 | 0 | 7 | 7 | 17 |

at Candlestick Park • San Francisco, California

- Date: September 18, 1988
- Game time: 1:00 p.m. PDT
- Game weather: 81 °F (27 °C); (Sunny) wind 12
- Game attendance: 60,168
- Referee: Fred Silva
- TV announcers (CBS): Tim Brant (play–by–play) and John Dockery (color commentator)

| Team | Category | Player | Statistics |
|---|---|---|---|
| ATL | Passing | Chris Miller | 12/24, 175 YDS, 2 INTs |
| ATL | Rushing | Gerald Riggs | 19 CAR, 115 YDS, 1 TD |
| ATL | Receiving | Gerald Riggs | 4 REC, 64 YDS |
| SF | Passing | Joe Montana | 32/48, 343 YDS, 2 TDs, 3 INTs |
| SF | Rushing | Roger Craig | 13 CAR, 57 YDS |
| SF | Receiving | Roger Craig | 10 REC, 61 YDS |

Scoring summary

| Quarter | Time | Drive | | | Team | Scoring information | Score | |
| Quarter | Time | Plays | Yards | TOP | Team | Scoring information | ATL | SF |
|---|---|---|---|---|---|---|---|---|
| 1 | 6:12 | 8 | 48 | | 49ers | 38-yard field goal by Cofer | 0 | 3 |
| 2 | 7:00 | 13 | 80 | | Falcons | Riggs 3-yard touchdown run, Davis kick good | 7 | 3 |
| 2 | 2:58 | 5 | 70 | | Falcons | Primus 29-yard touchdown run, Davis kick good | 14 | 3 |
| 2 | 0:00 | 6 | 54 | | Falcons | Miller 1-yard touchdown run, Davis kick good | 21 | 3 |
| 3 | 13:41 | 4 | –9 | | Falcons | 47-yard field goal by Davis | 24 | 3 |
| 3 | 8:17 | 10 | 80 | | 49ers | McIntyre 17-yard touchdown reception from Montana, Cofer kick good | 24 | 10 |
| 4 | 11:33 | – | – | – | Falcons | Interception returned 47 yards for touchdown by Moore, Davis kick good | 31 | 10 |
| 4 | 2:18 | 10 | 86 | | 49ers | Wilson 13-yard touchdown reception from Montana, Cofer kick good | 31 | 17 |
| 4 | 1:05 | 5 | 20 | | Falcons | 41-yard field goal by Davis | 34 | 17 |
| "TOP" = time of possession. For other American football terms, see Glossary of American football. | | | | | | | 34 | 17 |

- Point spread: 49ers –14
- Over/under: 44.0 (over)
- Time of game: 3 hours, 5 minutes

| Falcons | Game statistics | 49ers |
|---|---|---|
| 19 | First downs | 22 |
| 41–196 | Rushes–yards | 19–104 |
| 175 | Passing yards | 343 |
| 12–24–2 | Passes | 32–49–4 |
| 1–4 | Sacked–yards | 3–21 |
| 171 | Net passing yards | 322 |
| 367 | Total yards | 426 |
| 101 | Return yards | 60 |
| 4–40.0 | Punts | 4–41.5 |
| 0–0 | Fumbles–lost | 0–0 |
| 5–35 | Penalties–yards | 4–50 |
| 30:44 | Time of possession | 29:16 |

Individual stats

- Passing: Montana – 32/48, 343 YDS, 2 TDs, 3 INTs; Rice – 0/1, 0 YDS, 1 INT
- Rushing: Craig – 13 CAR, 57 YDS; Rathman – 2 CAR, 23 YDS; Rice – 2 CAR; 20 YDS; Montana – 2 CAR; 4 YDS
- Receiving: Craig – 10 REC, 61 YDS; Rice – 8 REC, 183 YDS; Rathman – 5 REC, 29 YDS; Chandler – 3 REC, 24 YDS; Wilson – 2 REC, 18 YDS, 1 TD; Heller – 2 REC, 17 YDS; McIntyre – 1 REC, 17 YDS, 1 TD; Nicholas – 1 REC, 14 YDS
- Kickoff returns: DuBose – 3 KR, 56 YDS
- Punt returns: Chandler – 2 PR, 4 YDS
- Punting: Helton – 4 PUNTS, 166 YDS
- Kicking: Cofer – 2/2 PAT, 1/1 FG
- Sacks: Stubbs – 1.0
- Interceptions: Fuller – 1 INT, 0 YDS; Holmoe – 1 INT, 0 YDS

The 49ers lost to the Falcons for only the fourth time since 1981 as Joe Montana was intercepted three times and sacked three times in a 34–17 rout. Gerald Riggs of the Falcons rushed for 115 yards and a touchdown.

=== Week 4 (Sunday, September 25, 1988): at Seattle Seahawks ===
Week 4: San Francisco 49ers at Seattle Seahawks – Game summary

| Quarter | 1 | 2 | 3 | 4 | Total |
|---|---|---|---|---|---|
| 49ers (3–1) | 7 | 10 | 14 | 7 | 38 |
| Seahawks (2–2) | 0 | 0 | 7 | 0 | 7 |

at The Kingdome • Seattle, Washington

- Date: September 25, 1988
- Game time: 1:00 p.m. PDT
- Game weather: indoors
- Game attendance: 62,382
- Referee: Dick Jorgensen
- TV announcers (CBS): Steve Zabriskie (play–by–play) and Terry Bradshaw (color commentator)

| Team | Category | Player | Statistics |
|---|---|---|---|
| SF | Passing | Joe Montana | 20/29, 302 YDS, 4 TDs, 1 INT |
| SF | Rushing | Roger Craig | 21 CAR, 107 YDS |
| SF | Receiving | Jerry Rice | 6 REC, 163 YDS, 3 TDs |
| SEA | Passing | Kelly Stouffer | 11/15, 133 YDS, 1 TD, 1 INT |
| SEA | Rushing | Curt Warner | 9 CAR, 29 YDS |
| SEA | Receiving | Ray Butler | 2 REC, 52 YDS, 1 TD |

Scoring summary

| Quarter | Time | Drive | | | Team | Scoring information | Score | |
| Quarter | Time | Plays | Yards | TOP | Team | Scoring information | SF | SEA |
|---|---|---|---|---|---|---|---|---|
| 1 | 6:02 | 7 | 63 | | 49ers | Rice 1-yard touchdown reception from Montana, Cofer kick good | 7 | 0 |
| 2 | 7:55 | 9 | 35 | | 49ers | Frank 13-yard touchdown reception from Montana, Cofer kick good | 14 | 0 |
| 2 | 1:57 | 5 | 40 | | 49ers | 21-yard field goal by Cofer | 17 | 0 |
| 3 | 11:05 | 3 | 76 | | 49ers | Rice 69-yard touchdown reception from Montana, Cofer kick good | 24 | 0 |
| 3 | 2:25 | 3 | 74 | | 49ers | Rice 60-yard touchdown reception from Montana, Cofer kick good | 31 | 0 |
| 3 | 1:24 | 3 | 71 | | Seahawks | Butler 46-yard touchdown reception from Stouffer, Johnson kick good | 31 | 7 |
| 4 | 4:07 | 18 | 85 | | 49ers | Wilson 16-yard touchdown reception from Young, Cofer kick good | 38 | 7 |
| "TOP" = time of possession. For other American football terms, see Glossary of American football. | | | | | | | 38 | 7 |

- Point spread:
- Over/under:
- Time of game: 3 hours, 0 minutes

| 49ers | Game statistics | Seahawks |
|---|---|---|
| 27 | First downs | 8 |
| 48–239 | Rushes–yards | 12–29 |
| 351 | Passing yards | 139 |
| 24–35–1 | Passes | 12–27–4 |
| 2–10 | Sacked–yards | 3–14 |
| 341 | Net passing yards | 125 |
| 580 | Total yards | 154 |
| 56 | Return yards | 180 |
| 3–37.3 | Punts | 7–43.9 |
| 1–0 | Fumbles–lost | 2–1 |
| 6–70 | Penalties–yards | 3–17 |
| 42:50 | Time of possession | 17:10 |

Individual stats

- Passing: Montana – 20/29, 302 YDS, 4 TDs, 1 INT; Young – 4/6, 49 YDS, 1 TD
- Rushing: Craig – 21 CAR, 107 YDS; Rathman – 15 CAR, 79 YDS; DuBose – 8 CAR, 38 YDS; Sydney – 3 CAR, 16 YDS; Young – 1 CAR, –1 YD
- Receiving: Rice – 6 REC, 163 YDS, 3 TDs; Craig – 6 REC, 38 YDS; Wilson – 4 REC, 62 YDS; Rathman – 3 REC, 37 YDS; DuBose – 3 REC, 29 YDS; Frank – 1 REC, 13 YDS, 1 TD; Sydney – 1 REC, 9 YDS
- Kickoff returns: DuBose – 2 KR, 28 YDS
- Punt returns: Chandler – 2 PR, 10 YDS; Griffin – 1 PR, 10 YDS
- Punting: Helton – 3 PUNTS, 112 YDS
- Kicking: Cofer – 5/5 PAT, 1/4 FG
- Sacks: Haley – 2.0; Carter – 1.0
- Interceptions: Fuller – 1 INT, 10 YDS; Holmoe – 1 INT, 0 YDS; McKyer – 1 INT; 0 YDS; Wright – 1 INT, –2 YDS
- 49ers Missed Field Goals: Cofer 31, 52, 55

The Niners rebounded by putting up 580 yards of offense in a 38–7 rout of the Seahawks. Joe Montana threw four touchdowns and Steve Young added a fifth while Roger Craig and Tom Rathman accounted for 186 rushing yards. The Seahawks' Jeff Kemp was intercepted three times and Kelly Stouffer added a fourth pick.

=== Week 5 (Sunday, October 2, 1988): vs. Detroit Lions ===
Week 5: Detroit Lions at San Francisco 49ers – Game summary

| Quarter | 1 | 2 | 3 | 4 | Total |
|---|---|---|---|---|---|
| Lions (1–4) | 0 | 3 | 3 | 7 | 13 |
| 49ers (4–1) | 0 | 10 | 7 | 3 | 20 |

at Candlestick Park • San Francisco, California

- Date: October 2, 1988
- Game time: 1:00 p.m. PDT
- Game weather: 68 °F (20 °C); (Sunny) wind 12
- Game attendance: 58,285
- Referee: Red Cashion
- TV announcers (CBS): Verne Lundquist (play–by–play) and Terry Bradshaw (color commentator)

| Team | Category | Player | Statistics |
|---|---|---|---|
| DET | Passing | Chuck Long | 11/19, 139 YDS, 1 TD |
| DET | Rushing | Garry James | 12 CAR, 30 YDS |
| DET | Receiving | Pete Mandley | 7 REC, 116 YDS, 1 TD |
| SF | Passing | Joe Montana | 19/30, 182 YDS |
| SF | Rushing | Roger Craig | 18 CAR, 90 YDS |
| SF | Receiving | Mike Wilson | 6 REC, 59 YDS |

Scoring summary

| Quarter | Time | Drive | | | Team | Scoring information | Score | |
| Quarter | Time | Plays | Yards | TOP | Team | Scoring information | DET | SF |
|---|---|---|---|---|---|---|---|---|
| 2 | 10:39 | 13 | 80 | | 49ers | Rice 11-yard touchdown run, Cofer kick good | 0 | 7 |
| 2 | 1:58 | 13 | 54 | | Lions | 24-yard field goal by Murray | 3 | 7 |
| 2 | 0:03 | 10 | 68 | | 49ers | 29-yard field goal by Cofer | 3 | 10 |
| 3 | 12:35 | – | – | – | 49ers | Taylor 77-yard punt return for a touchdown, Cofer kick good | 3 | 17 |
| 3 | 3:32 | 10 | 73 | | Lions | 34-yard field goal by Murray | 6 | 17 |
| 4 | 8:08 | 12 | 64 | | 49ers | 29-yard field goal by Cofer | 6 | 20 |
| 4 | 5:32 | 8 | 88 | | Lions | Mandley 11-yard touchdown reception from Long, Murray kick good | 13 | 20 |
| "TOP" = time of possession. For other American football terms, see Glossary of American football. | | | | | | | 13 | 20 |

- Point spread:
- Over/under:
- Time of game: 3 hours, 2 minutes

| Lions | Game statistics | 49ers |
|---|---|---|
| 18 | First downs | 19 |
| 21–49 | Rushes–yards | 35–176 |
| 275 | Passing yards | 182 |
| 21–37–0 | Passes | 19–30–0 |
| 4–27 | Sacked–yards | 2–19 |
| 248 | Net passing yards | 163 |
| 297 | Total yards | 339 |
| 86 | Return yards | 171 |
| 6–39.2 | Punts | 6–36.8 |
| 3–2 | Fumbles–lost | 2–1 |
| 2–15 | Penalties–yards | 4–25 |
| 31:19 | Time of possession | 28:41 |

Individual stats

- Passing: Montana – 19/30, 182 YDS
- Rushing: Craig – 18 CAR, 90 YDS; Rathman – 12 CAR, 74 YDS; Rice – 1 CAR, 11 YDS, 1 TD; Montana – 4 CAR, 1 YD
- Receiving: Wilson – 6 REC, 59 YDS; Craig – 5 REC, 31 YDS; Rathman – 4 REC, 38 YDS; Rice – 2 REC, 35 YDS; Heller – 2 REC, 19 YDS
- Kickoff returns: Taylor – 2 KR, 41 YDS; Dubose – 1 KR, 24 YDS; Craig – 1 KR, 17 YDS
- Punt returns: Taylor – 4 PR, 89 YDS, 1 TD
- Punting: Helton – 6 PUNTS, 221 YDS
- Kicking: Cofer – 2/2 PAT, 2/2 FG
- Sacks: Carter – 1.0; Griffin – 1.0; Haley – 1.0; Roberts – 1.0

=== Week 6 (Sunday, October 9, 1988): vs. Denver Broncos ===
Week 6: Denver Broncos at San Francisco 49ers – Game summary

| Quarter | 1 | 2 | 3 | 4 | OT | Total |
|---|---|---|---|---|---|---|
| Broncos (3–3) | 0 | 3 | 3 | 7 | 3 | 16 |
| 49ers (4–2) | 3 | 7 | 3 | 0 | 0 | 13 |

at Candlestick Park • San Francisco, California

- Date: October 9, 1988
- Game time: 1:00 p.m. PDT
- Game weather: 77 °F (25 °C); (Sunny) wind 15
- Game attendance: 61,711
- Referee: Jim Tunney
- TV announcers (NBC): Dick Enberg (play–by–play) and Merlin Olsen (color commentator)

| Team | Category | Player | Statistics |
|---|---|---|---|
| DEN | Passing | John Elway | 21/39, 210 YDS, 1 TD, 2 INTs |
| DEN | Rushing | Sammy Winder | 17 CAR, 100 YDS |
| DEN | Receiving | Vance Johnson | 8 REC, 85 YDS, 1 TD |
| SF | Passing | Joe Montana | 12/24, 191 YDS, 1 INT |
| SF | Rushing | Roger Craig | 26 CAR, 143 YDS |
| SF | Receiving | Tom Rathman | 5 REC, 27 YDS |

Scoring summary

| Quarter | Time | Drive | | | Team | Scoring information | Score | |
| Quarter | Time | Plays | Yards | TOP | Team | Scoring information | DEN | SF |
|---|---|---|---|---|---|---|---|---|
| 1 | 3:42 | 5 | 32 | | 49ers | 37-yard field goal by Cofer | 0 | 3 |
| 2 | 14:47 | 14 | 69 | | Broncos | 27-yard field goal by Karlis | 3 | 3 |
| 2 | 6:50 | 8 | 95 | | 49ers | Montana 6-yard touchdown run, Cofer kick good | 3 | 10 |
| 3 | 5:18 | 10 | 61 | | Broncos | 27-yard field goal by Karlis | 6 | 10 |
| 3 | 1:09 | 12 | 55 | | 49ers | 27-yard field goal by Cofer | 6 | 13 |
| 4 | 6:23 | 9 | 58 | | Broncos | Johnson 8-yard touchdown reception from Elway, Karlis kick good | 13 | 13 |
| OT | 7:49 | 2 | 0 | | Broncos | 22-yard field goal by Karlis | 16 | 13 |
| "TOP" = time of possession. For other American football terms, see Glossary of American football. | | | | | | | 16 | 13 |

- Point spread:
- Over/under:
- Time of game: 3 hours, 37 minutes

| Broncos | Game statistics | 49ers |
|---|---|---|
| 24 | First downs | 21 |
| 31–147 | Rushes–yards | 48–246 |
| 210 | Passing yards | 191 |
| 21–39–2 | Passes | 12–28–3 |
| 5–43 | Sacked–yards | 3–20 |
| 167 | Net passing yards | 171 |
| 357 | Total yards | 417 |
| 91 | Return yards | 102 |
| 6–45.2 | Punts | 4–43.3 |
| 2–1 | Fumbles–lost | 2–1 |
| 5–40 | Penalties–yards | 14–93 |
| 32:44 | Time of possession | 35:27 |

Individual stats

- Passing: Montana – 12/24, 191 YDS, 1 INT; Young – 0/3, 0 YDS, 2 INTs; Sydney – 0/1, 0 YDS
- Rushing: Roger Craig – 26 CAR, 143 YDS; Rathman – 11 CAR, 55 YDS; Rice – 2 CAR, 27 YDS; Montana – 6 CAR, 13 YDS, 1 TD; Young – 3 CAR, 8 YDS
- Receiving: Rathman – 5 REC, 27 YDS; Rice – 3 REC, 78 YDS; Craig – 2 REC, 18 YDS; Taylor – 1 REC, 55 YDS; Wilson – 1 REC, 13 YDS
- Kickoff returns: DuBose – 3 KR, 55 YDS
- Punt returns: Taylor – 3 PR, 45 YDS; Griffin – 1 PR, 0 YDS
- Punting: Helton – 4 OUNTS, 173 YDS
- Kicking: Cofer – 1/1 PAT, 2/3 FG
- Sacks: Haley – 2.0; Fuller – 1.0; Stubbs – 1.0; Walter – 1.0
- Interceptions: Turner – 1 INT, 2 TDS; McKyer – 1 INT, 0 YDS
- 49ers Missed Field Goals: Cofer 47

Joe Montana ran in a six-yard touchdown and threw for 191 yards and an interception; he was sacked three times and replaced by Young as John Elway tied the game 13–13 on a touchdown to Vance Johnson. Wind gusts up to 40 mph suddenly hit Candlestick Park and made passing more difficult; in overtime a Steve Young pass was intercepted (Young's second pick of the game), setting up Rich Karlis' winning field goal (16–13 final for the Broncos).

=== Week 7 (Sunday, October 16, 1988): at Los Angeles Rams ===
Week 7: San Francisco 49ers at Los Angeles Rams – Game summary

| Quarter | 1 | 2 | 3 | 4 | Total |
|---|---|---|---|---|---|
| 49ers (5–2) | 7 | 10 | 0 | 7 | 24 |
| Rams (5–2) | 7 | 0 | 14 | 0 | 21 |

at Anaheim Stadium • Anaheim, California

- Date: October 16, 1988
- Game time: 1:00 p.m. PDT
- Game weather: 66 °F (19 °C); wind 8
- Game attendance: 65,450
- Referee: Jerry Seeman
- TV announcers (CBS): Pat Summerall (play–by–play) and John Madden (color commentator)

| Team | Category | Player | Statistics |
|---|---|---|---|
| SF | Passing | Joe Montana | 21/31, 203 YDS, 1 INT |
| SF | Rushing | Roger Craig | 22 CAR, 190 YDS, 3 TDs |
| SF | Receiving | Roger Craig | 5 REC, 12 YDS |
| LARams | Passing | Jim Everett | 20/33, 199 YDS, 3 TDs, 2 INTs |
| LARams | Rushing | Greg Bell | 13 CAR, 28 YDS |
| LARams | Receiving | Henry Ellard | 7 REC, 83 YDS, 1 TD |

Scoring summary

| Quarter | Time | Drive | | | Team | Scoring information | Score | |
| Quarter | Time | Plays | Yards | TOP | Team | Scoring information | SF | LARams |
|---|---|---|---|---|---|---|---|---|
| 1 | 4:40 | 2 | 59 | | 49ers | Craig 46-yard touchdown run, Cofer kick good | 7 | 0 |
| 1 | 3:33 | 3 | 58 | | Rams | Cox 44-yard touchdown reception from Everett, Lansford kick good | 7 | 7 |
| 2 | 14:24 | 10 | 80 | | 49ers | Craig 2-yard touchdown run, Cofer kick good | 14 | 7 |
| 2 | 3:41 | 12 | 66 | | 49ers | 40-yard field goal by Cofer | 17 | 7 |
| 3 | 9:20 | 4 | 34 | | Rams | Ellard 18-yard touchdown reception from Everett, Lansford kick good | 17 | 14 |
| 3 | 0:25 | 6 | 34 | | Rams | McGee 8-yard touchdown reception from Everett, Lansford kick good | 17 | 21 |
| 4 | 12:21 | 11 | 93 | | 49ers | Craig 16-yard touchdown run, Cofer kick good | 24 | 21 |
| "TOP" = time of possession. For other American football terms, see Glossary of American football. | | | | | | | 24 | 21 |

- Point spread:
- Over/under:
- Time of game:

| 49ers | Game statistics | Rams |
|---|---|---|
| 24 | First downs | 14 |
| 40–245 | Rushes–yards | 17–42 |
| 203 | Passing yards | 199 |
| 21–33–1 | Passes | 20–33–2 |
| 2–19 | Sacked–yards | 1–5 |
| 184 | Net passing yards | 194 |
| 429 | Total yards | 236 |
| 61 | Return yards | 154 |
| 7–34.3 | Punts | 7–43.9 |
| 4–1 | Fumbles–lost | 4–2 |
| 7–73 | Penalties–yards | 5–35 |
| 36:11 | Time of possession | 23:49 |

Individual stats

- Passing: Montana – 21/31, 203 YDS, 1 INT; Young – 0/2, 0 YDS
- Rushing: Craig – 22 CAR, 190 YDS, 3 TDs; Rathman – 9 CAR, 19 YDS; DuBose – 5 CAR, 16 YDS; Sydney – 1 CAR, 13 YDS; Montana – 2 CAR, 7 YDS; Young – 1 CAR, 0 YDS
- Receiving: Craig – 5 REC, 12 YDS; Rice – 4 REC, 65 YDS; Rathman – 4 REC, 44 YDS; DuBose – 2 REC, 22 YDS; Jones – 2 REC, 4 YDS; Greer – 1 REC, 31 YDS; Taylor – 1 REC, 14 YDS; Wilson – 1 REC, 11 YDS; Heller – 1 REC, 0 YDS
- Kickoff returns: Taylor – 2 KR, 31 YDS; DuBose – 1 KR, 0 YDS
- Punt returns: Taylor – 6 PR, 26 YDS
- Punting: Helton – 7 PUNTS, 240 YDS
- Kicking: Cofer – 3/3 PAT, 1/2 FG
- Sacks: Stubbs – 1.0
- Interceptions: Lott – 2 INTs, 4 YDS
- 49ers Missed Field Goals: Cofer 47

Roger Craig had one of his greatest games in a 190-yard stampede where he scored three touchdowns, highlighted by a dramatic 46-yard score in the first quarter. Despite three Jim Everett touchdowns the Rams fell to San Francisco 24–21, the tenth 49ers win in the rivalry's previous 14 games.

=== Week 8: (Monday, October 24, 1988): at Chicago Bears ===
Week 8: San Francisco 49ers at Chicago Bears – Game summary

| Quarter | 1 | 2 | 3 | 4 | Total |
|---|---|---|---|---|---|
| 49ers (5–3) | 7 | 0 | 2 | 0 | 9 |
| Bears (7–1) | 0 | 10 | 0 | 0 | 10 |

at Soldier Field • Chicago, Illinois

- Date: October 24, 1988
- Game time: 6:00 p.m. PDT
- Game weather: 38 °F (3 °C); wind 17, wind chill 29 °F (−2 °C)
- Game attendance: 65,293
- Referee: Johnny Grier
- TV announcers (ABC): Al Michaels (play–by–play), Dan Dierdorf (color commentator) and Frank Gifford (color commentator)

| Team | Category | Player | Statistics |
|---|---|---|---|
| SF | Passing | Joe Montana | 13/29, 168 YDS, 1 TD, 1 INT |
| SF | Rushing | Roger Craig | 10 CAR, 31 YDS |
| SF | Receiving | Roger Craig | 6 REC, 39 YDS |
| CHI | Passing | Jim McMahon | 10/22, 132 YDS, 1 INT |
| CHI | Rushing | Neal Anderson | 16 CAR, 62 YDS |
| CHI | Receiving | Neal Anderson | 3 REC, 40 YDS |

Scoring summary

| Quarter | Time | Drive | | | Team | Scoring information | Score | |
| Quarter | Time | Plays | Yards | TOP | Team | Scoring information | SF | CHI |
|---|---|---|---|---|---|---|---|---|
| 1 | 6:56 | 8 | 88 | | 49ers | Rice 23-yard touchdown reception from Montana, Cofer kick good | 7 | 0 |
| 2 | 3:28 | 4 | 37 | | Bears | McMahon 1-yard touchdown run, Butler kick good | 7 | 7 |
| 2 | 0:00 | 8 | 35 | | Bears | 18-yard field goal by Butler | 7 | 10 |
| 3 | 11:04 | – | – | – | 49ers | McMahon tackled in end zone for a safety by Roberts and Haley | 9 | 10 |
| "TOP" = time of possession. For other American football terms, see Glossary of American football. | | | | | | | 9 | 10 |

- Point spread:
- Over/under:
- Time of game: 2 hours, 59 minutes

| 49ers | Game statistics | Bears |
|---|---|---|
| 12 | First downs | 14 |
| 21–78 | Rushes–yards | 41–122 |
| 169 | Passing yards | 132 |
| 14–30–1 | Passes | 10–22–1 |
| 4–34 | Sacked–yards | 3–17 |
| 135 | Net passing yards | 115 |
| 213 | Total yards | 237 |
| 103 | Return yards | 58 |
| 8–37.2 | Punts | 7–33.4 |
| 1–0 | Fumbles–lost | 1–0 |
| 10–57 | Penalties–yards | 2–14 |
| 23:29 | Time of possession | 36:21 |

Individual stats

- Passing: Montana – 13/29, 168 YDS, 1 TD, 1 INT; Young – 1/1, 1 YD
- Rushing: Craig – 10 CAR, 31 YDS; Rathman – 6 CAR, 21 YDS; Montana – 1 CAR, 15 YDS; Rice – 2 CAR, 8 YDS; Young – 2 CAR, 3 YDS
- Receiving: Craig – 6 REC, 39 YDS; Rice – 4 REC, 86 YDS, 1 TD; Heller – 3 REC, 31 YDS; Rathman – 1 REC, 13 YDS
- Kickoff returns: Taylor – 3 KR, 36 YDS
- Punt returns: Taylor – 4 PR, 57 YDS
- Punting: Helton – 8 PUNTS, 293 YDS
- Kicking: Cofer – 1/1 PAT, 0/1 FG
- Sacks: Haley – 3.0
- Interceptions: McKyer – 1 INT, 0 YDS
- 49ers Missed Field Goals: Cofer 51

The Niners struggled to a 10–9 loss to the Bears on Monday Night Football. The Niners incurred ten penalties for 57 yards and Joe Montana was sacked four times.

=== Week 9 (Sunday, October 30, 1988): vs. Minnesota Vikings ===
Week 9: Minnesota Vikings at San Francisco 49ers – Game summary

| Quarter | 1 | 2 | 3 | 4 | Total |
|---|---|---|---|---|---|
| Vikings (5–4) | 0 | 7 | 7 | 7 | 21 |
| 49ers (6–3) | 0 | 3 | 14 | 7 | 24 |

at Candlestick Park • San Francisco, California

- Date: October 30, 1988
- Game time: 1:00 p.m. PST
- Game weather: 70 °F (21 °C); (Sunny) wind 9
- Game attendance: 60,738
- Referee: Fred Silva
- TV announcers (CBS): Pat Summerall (play–by–play) and John Madden (color commentator)

| Team | Category | Player | Statistics |
|---|---|---|---|
| MIN | Passing | Wade Wilson | 18/30, 243 YDS, 1 TD, 2 INTs |
| MIN | Rushing | Rick Fenney | 6 CAR, 35 YDS, 1 TD |
| MIN | Receiving | Hassan Jones | 6 REC, 81 YDS |
| SF | Passing | Steve Young | 14/25, 232 YDS, 1 TD |
| SF | Rushing | Steve Young | 7 CAR, 72 YDS, 1 TD |
| SF | Receiving | Roger Craig | 3 REC, 37 YDS |

Scoring summary

| Quarter | Time | Drive | | | Team | Scoring information | Score | |
| Quarter | Time | Plays | Yards | TOP | Team | Scoring information | MIN | SF |
|---|---|---|---|---|---|---|---|---|
| 2 | 13:26 | 2 | 27 | | Vikings | Wilson 2-yard touchdown run, Nelson kick good | 7 | 0 |
| 2 | 0:31 | 7 | 22 | | 49ers | 30-yard field goal by Cofer | 7 | 3 |
| 3 | 4:16 | 12 | 97 | | 49ers | Craig 1-yard touchdown run, Cofer kick good | 7 | 10 |
| 2 | 2:36 | 5 | 78 | | Vikings | Carter 67-yard touchdown reception from Wilson, Nelson kick good | 14 | 10 |
| 2 | 2:17 | 1 | 73 | | 49ers | Taylor 73-yard touchdown reception from Young, Cofer kick good | 14 | 17 |
| 4 | 13:33 | 2 | 21 | | Vikings | Fenney 12-yard touchdown run, Nelson kick good | 21 | 17 |
| 4 | 1:58 | 3 | 57 | | 49ers | Young 49-yard touchdown run, Cofer kick good | 21 | 24 |
| "TOP" = time of possession. For other American football terms, see Glossary of American football. | | | | | | | 21 | 24 |

- Point spread:
- Over/under:
- Time of game: 3 hours, 8 minutes

| Vikings | Game statistics | 49ers |
|---|---|---|
| 15 | First downs | 16 |
| 31–92 | Rushes–yards | 28–130 |
| 243 | Passing yards | 232 |
| 18–30–2 | Passes | 14–25–0 |
| 2–14 | Sacked–yards | 4–23 |
| 229 | Net passing yards | 209 |
| 321 | Total yards | 339 |
| 160 | Return yards | 148 |
| 6–42.2 | Punts | 7–43.6 |
| 1–1 | Fumbles–lost | 3–2 |
| 8–53 | Penalties–yards | 5–51 |
| 30:49 | Time of possession | 29:11 |

Individual stats

- Passing: Young – 14/25, 232 YDS, 1 TD
- Rushing: Young – 7 CAR, 72 YDS, 1 TD; Roger Craig – 19 CAR, 56 YDS; Rathman – 2 CAR, 2 YDS
- Receiving: Craig – 3 REC, 37 YDS; Wilson – 3 REC, 31 YDS; Jones – 3 REC, 26 YDS; Taylor – 2 REC, 88 YDS, 1 TD; Rice – 1 REC, 22 YDS; Greeg – 1 REC, 18 YDS; Rathman – 1 REC, 10 YDS
- Kickoff returns: DuBose – 2 KR, 54 YDS; Taylor – 2 KR, 46 YDS
- Punt returns: Taylor – 4 PR, 44 YDS
- Punts: Helton – 7 PUNTS, 305 YDS
- Kicking: Cofer – 3/3 PAT, 1/2 FG
- Sacks: Fagan – 1.0; Haley – 0.5; Roberts – 0.5
- Interceptions: McKyer – 2 INTs; 4 YDS
- 49ers Missed Field Goals: Cofer 45

The Vikings' playoff win at San Francisco the previous season hung over Candlestick Park as Coach Walsh started Steve Young in Joe Montana's stead. Young struggled and was booed repeatedly by the crowd ("They were running him out of town", lineman Harris Barton said). Just before the two-minute warning in the fourth quarter the Vikings led 21–17 with the Niners at Minnesota's 49-yard line; Young escaped a sack and ran in the game-winning touchdown, earning applause from the same audience that had been booing him; the NFL Films clip with Lon Simmons' call of the score is among the most replayed in retrospectives on Young's career.

=== Week 10: (Sunday, November 6, 1988): at Phoenix Cardinals ===
Week 10: San Francisco 49ers at Phoenix Cardinals – Game summary

| Quarter | 1 | 2 | 3 | 4 | Total |
|---|---|---|---|---|---|
| 49ers (6–4) | 3 | 13 | 7 | 0 | 23 |
| Cardinals (6–4) | 0 | 0 | 7 | 17 | 24 |

at Sun Devil Stadium • Tempe, Arizona

- Date: November 6, 1988
- Game time: 1:00 p.m. PST
- Game weather: 74 °F (23 °C); wind 6
- Game attendance: 64,544
- Referee: Jerry Markbreit
- TV announcers (CBS): Tim Ryan (play–by–play) and Dan Jiggetts (color commentator)

| Team | Category | Player | Statistics |
|---|---|---|---|
| SF | Passing | Steve Young | 14/27, 145 YDS, 1 TD |
| SF | Rushing | Roger Craig | 26 CAR, 162 YDS, 1 TD |
| SF | Receiving | Tom Rathman | 4 REC, 45 YDS |
| PHO | Passing | Neil Lomax | 25/41, 323 YDS, 3 TDs |
| PHO | Rushing | Earl Ferrell | 12 CAR, 54 YDS |
| PHO | Receiving | Roy Green | 6 REC, 93 YDS, 2 TDs |

Scoring summary

| Quarter | Time | Drive | | | Team | Scoring information | Score | |
| Quarter | Time | Plays | Yards | TOP | Team | Scoring information | SF | PHO |
|---|---|---|---|---|---|---|---|---|
| 1 | 11:41 | 9 | 54 | | 49ers | 42-yard field goal by Cofer | 3 | 0 |
| 2 | 12:06 | 10 | 70 | | 49ers | Craig 3-yard touchdown run, Cofer kick good | 10 | 0 |
| 2 | 8:24 | 6 | 34 | | 49ers | 27-yard field goal by Cofer | 13 | 0 |
| 2 | 0:08 | 9 | 45 | | 49ers | 30-yard field goal by Cofer | 16 | 0 |
| 3 | 7:20 | 12 | 75 | | 49ers | Jones 3-yard touchdown reception from Young, Cofer kick good | 23 | 0 |
| 3 | 3:39 | 8 | 74 | | Cardinals | Green 35-yard touchdown reception from Lomax, Del Greco kick good | 23 | 7 |
| 4 | 10:51 | 9 | 59 | | Cardinals | 24-yard field goal by Del Greco | 23 | 10 |
| 4 | 2:19 | 8 | 50 | | Cardinals | Jones 35-yard touchdown reception from Lomax, Del Greco kick good | 23 | 17 |
| 4 | 0:03 | 7 | 66 | | Cardinals | Green 9-yard touchdown reception from Lomax, Del Greco kick good | 23 | 24 |
| "TOP" = time of possession. For other American football terms, see Glossary of American football. | | | | | | | 23 | 24 |

- Point spread:
- Over/under:
- Time of game: 3 hours, 29 minutes

| 49ers | Game statistics | Cardinals |
|---|---|---|
| 22 | First downs | 21 |
| 38–240 | Rushes–yards | 19–67 |
| 145 | Passing yards | 323 |
| 14–27–0 | Passes | 25–41–0 |
| 4–28 | Sacked–yards | 7–35 |
| 117 | Net passing yards | 288 |
| 357 | Total yards | 355 |
| 94 | Return yards | 172 |
| 7–46.6 | Punts | 5–45.2 |
| 0–0 | Fumbles–lost | 3–3 |
| 14–106 | Penalties–yards | 3–30 |
| 34:31 | Time of possession | 25:29 |

Individual stats

- Passing: Young – 14/27, 145 YDS, 1 TD
- Rushing: Craig – 25 CAR, 162 YDS, 1 TD; Rathman – 5 CAR, 33 YDS; Young – 3 CAR, 26 YDS; Sydney – 1 CAR, 8 YDS; Flagler – 2 CAR, 6 YDS; Rice – 1 CAR, 5 YDS
- Receiving: Rathman – 4 REC, 45 YDS; Rice – 3 REC, 37 YDS; Heller – 2 REC, 24 YDS; Wilson – 2 REC, 24 YDS; Greer – 1 REC, 12 YDS; Jones – 1 REC, 3 YDS, 1 TD; Craig – 1 REC, 0 YDS
- Kickoff returns: DuBose – 3 KR, 48 YDS; Craig – 1 KR, 15 YDS; Thomas – 1 KR, 5 YDS
- Punt returns: Taylor – 3 PR, 26 YDS
- Punts: Helton – 7 PUNTS, 326 YDS
- Kicking: Cofer – 2/2 PAT, 3/3 FG
- Sacks: Roberts – 2.5; Holt – 2.0; Carter – 1.5; Stubbs – 1.0

With Young still starting, the 49ers raced to a 23–0 lead in the third quarter, and Coach Bill Walsh felt it was the sharpest the offense had looked all season. The Cardinals, however, began clawing back as Neil Lomax rifled a pair of touchdowns; making matters worse for San Francisco was a whopping 14 penalties for 106 yards. On a kick return Walsh was blindsided by a runner and suffered two cracked ribs; he then had to watch as the Cardinals raced down field in the final minute and scored on a nine-yard Lomax score to Roy Green. It turned out to be the last road loss for the 49ers until Week One of the 1991 season.

=== Week 11 (Sunday, November 13, 1988): vs. Los Angeles Raiders ===
Week 11: Los Angeles Raiders at San Francisco 49ers – Game summary

| Quarter | 1 | 2 | 3 | 4 | Total |
|---|---|---|---|---|---|
| Raiders (6–5) | 0 | 0 | 6 | 3 | 9 |
| 49ers (6–5) | 0 | 3 | 0 | 0 | 3 |

at Candlestick Park • San Francisco, California

- Date: November 13, 1988
- Game time: 1:00 p.m. PST
- Game weather: 55 °F (13 °C); (Light Rain) wind 20
- Game attendance: 54,448
- Referee: Pat Haggerty
- TV announcers (NBC): Tom Hammond (play–by–play) and Joe Namath (color commentator)

| Team | Category | Player | Statistics |
|---|---|---|---|
| RAI | Passing | Steve Beuerlein | 8/22, 112 YDS |
| RAI | Rushing | Bo Jackson | 18 CAR, 85 YDS |
| RAI | Receiving | Tim Brown | 4 REC, 58 YDS |
| SF | Passing | Joe Montana | 16/31, 160 YDS |
| SF | Rushing | Roger Craig | 17 CAR, 58 YDS |
| SF | Receiving | Jerry Rice | 5 REC, 61 YDS |

Scoring summary

| Quarter | Time | Drive | | | Team | Scoring information | Score | |
| Quarter | Time | Plays | Yards | TOP | Team | Scoring information | RAI | SF |
|---|---|---|---|---|---|---|---|---|
| 2 | 3:17 | 7 | 33 | | 49ers | 44-yard field goal by Cofer | 0 | 3 |
| 3 | 10:32 | 7 | 41 | | Raiders | 45-yard field goal by Bahr | 3 | 3 |
| 3 | 6:51 | 4 | 18 | | Raiders | 50-yard field goal by Bahr | 6 | 3 |
| 4 | 7:08 | 7 | 14 | | Raiders | 19-yard field goal by Bahr | 9 | 3 |
| "TOP" = time of possession. For other American football terms, see Glossary of American football. | | | | | | | 9 | 3 |

- Point spread:
- Over/under:
- Time of game: 2 hours, 59 minutes

| Raiders | Game statistics | 49ers |
|---|---|---|
| 17 | First downs | 15 |
| 45–159 | Rushes–yards | 26–83 |
| 112 | Passing yards | 112 |
| 8–22–0 | Passes | 16–31–0 |
| 2–20 | Sacked–yards | 4–24 |
| 92 | Net passing yards | 88 |
| 251 | Total yards | 219 |
| 31 | Return yards | 72 |
| 6–39.0 | Punts | 8–38.2 |
| 1–1 | Fumbles–lost | 3–2 |
| 6–48 | Penalties–yards | 8–85 |
| 35:33 | Time of possession | 24:27 |

Individual stats

- Passing: Montana – 16/31, 160 YDS
- Rushing: Craig – 17 CAR, 58 YDS; Rathman – 3 CAR, 15 YDS; Montana – 4 CAR, 12 YDS; Rice – 2 CAR, –2 YDS
- Receiving: Rice – 5 REC, 61 YDS; Craig – 5 REC, 29 YDS; Wilson – 4 REC, 44 TDS; Heller – 1 REC, 15 YDS; Rathman – 1 REC, 11 YDS
- Kickoff returns: DuBose – 3 KR, 44 YDS
- Punt returns: Taylor – 3 PR, 28 YDS
- Punting: Helton – 8 PUNTS, 306 YDS
- Kicking: Cofer – 1/1 FG
- Sacks: Ellison – 1.0; Holt – 1.0

The low point for the 49ers season came against the Raiders as Joe Montana started despite continuing concern by Walsh over his health; Montana had lost eight pounds and was coming off a stomach illness. Montana was held to 160 passing yards as the Raiders clawed out a 9–3 win. The 49ers’ final drive stalled when officials did not call a pass interference penalty on the Raiders over a play to Jerry Rice inside the 10-yard line.

As a result, it was the second game of the season they didn't score a touchdown. Following the loss, amid chatter from players interpreted as them giving up on the season, Ronnie Lott called a players-only meeting; Harris Barton called it "a ‘screw the coaches’ meeting" and said that it worked to refocus the players on playing better ("They usually don't work, but this one did.")

=== Week 12 (Monday, November 21, 1988): vs. Washington Redskins ===
Week 12: Washington Redskins at San Francisco 49ers – Game summary

| Quarter | 1 | 2 | 3 | 4 | Total |
|---|---|---|---|---|---|
| Redskins (6–6) | 7 | 0 | 7 | 7 | 21 |
| 49ers (7–5) | 7 | 16 | 0 | 14 | 37 |

at Candlestick Park • San Francisco, California

- Date: November 21, 1988
- Game time: 6:00 p.m. PST
- Game weather: 57 °F (14 °C); (Light Rain) wind 8
- Game attendance: 59,268
- Referee: Jerry Seeman
- TV announcers (ABC): Al Michaels (play–by–play), Dan Dierdorf (color commentator) and Frank Gifford (color commentator)

| Team | Category | Player | Statistics |
|---|---|---|---|
| WSH | Passing | Doug Williams | 27/41, 271 YDS, 3 TDs, 2 INTs |
| WSH | Rushing | Mike Oliphant | 4 CAR, 29 YDS |
| WSH | Receiving | Art Monk | 9 REC, 89 YDS, 1 TD |
| SF | Passing | Joe Montana | 15/23, 218 YDS, 2 IDs, 1 INT |
| SF | Rushing | Roger Craig | 24 CAR, 75 YDS |
| SF | Receiving | Roger Craig | 5 REC, 37 YDS |

Scoring summary

| Quarter | Time | Drive | | | Team | Scoring information | Score | |
| Quarter | Time | Plays | Yards | TOP | Team | Scoring information | WSH | SF |
|---|---|---|---|---|---|---|---|---|
| 1 | 8:14 | 5 | 55 | | 49ers | Jones 18-yard touchdown reception from Montana, Cofer kick good | 0 | 7 |
| 1 | 0:07 | 5 | 35 | | Redskins | Sanders 15-yard touchdown reception from Williams, Lohmiller kick good | 7 | 7 |
| 2 | 11:46 | 10 | 34 | | 49ers | 52-yard field goal by Cofer | 7 | 10 |
| 2 | 4:24 | – | – | – | 49ers | Taylor 95-yard punt return for a touchdown, Cofer kick good | 7 | 17 |
| 2 | 0:40 | 9 | 48 | | 49ers | Rathman 1-yard touchdown run, Cofer kick no good | 7 | 23 |
| 3 | 1:37 | 9 | 41 | | Redskins | Sanders 4-yard touchdown reception from Williams, Lohmiller kick good | 14 | 23 |
| 4 | 11:58 | 6 | 44 | | 49ers | Montana 4-yard touchdown run, Cofer kick good | 14 | 30 |
| 4 | 4:10 | 5 | 96 | | 49ers | Rice 80-yard touchdown reception from Montana, Cofer kick good | 14 | 37 |
| 4 | 2:02 | 10 | 76 | | Redskins | Monk 18-yard touchdown reception from Williams, Lohmiller kick good | 21 | 37 |
| "TOP" = time of possession. For other American football terms, see Glossary of American football. | | | | | | | 21 | 37 |

- Point spread:
- Over/under:
- Time of game: 3 hours, 6 minutes

| Redskins | Game statistics | 49ers |
|---|---|---|
| 20 | First downs | 18 |
| 25–56 | Rushes–yards | 30–112 |
| 271 | Passing yards | 218 |
| 27–42–2 | Passes | 15–25–2 |
| 0–0 | Sacked–yards | 2–10 |
| 271 | Net passing yards | 208 |
| 327 | Total yards | 320 |
| 150 | Return yards | 177 |
| 4–39.2 | Punts | 5–36.6 |
| 4–2 | Fumbles–lost | 0–0 |
| 5–51 | Penalties–yards | 10–65 |
| 33:28 | Time of possession | 26:32 |

Individual stats

- Passing: Montana – 15/23, 218 YDS, 2 TDs, 1 INT; Young – 0/2, 0 YDS, 1 INT
- Rushing: Craig – 24 CAR, 75 YDS; Montana – 2 CAR, 20 YDS, 1 TD; Young – 1 CAR, 12 YDS; Rathman – 2 CAR, 5 YDS, 1 TD; DuBose – 1 CAR, 0 YDS
- Receiving: Craig – 5 REC, 37 YDS; Rice – 3 REC, 105 YDS, 1 TD; Wilson – 2 REC, 18 YDS; Rathman – 2 REC, 12 YDS; Taylor – 1 REC, 22 YDS; Jones – 1 REC, 18 YDS, TD; DuBose – 1 REC, 6 YDS
- Kickoff returns: Taylor – 2 KR, 44 YDS; DuBose – 1 KR, 13 YDS; Wilson – 1 KR, 2 YDS
- Punt returns: Taylor – 4 PR, 113 YDS
- Punting: Helton – 5 PUNTS, 183 YDS
- Kicking: Cofer – 4/5 PAT, 1/1 FG
- Interceptions: Fuller – 1 INT, 5 YDS; Lott – 1 INT, 0 YDS

The refocused Niners erupted on the defending champion Redskins, racing to a 23–7 halftime lead and winning 37–21. Joe Montana threw two touchdowns (including an 80-yarder to Jerry Rice) and ran in a third. Super Bowl MVP Doug Williams of the Redskins threw three touchdowns while Timmy Smith was held to just six rushing yards.

=== Week 13 (Sunday, November 27, 1988): at San Diego Chargers ===
Week 13: San Francisco 49ers at San Diego Chargers – Game summary

| Quarter | 1 | 2 | 3 | 4 | Total |
|---|---|---|---|---|---|
| 49ers (8–5) | 7 | 17 | 14 | 10 | 48 |
| Chargers (4–9) | 0 | 7 | 3 | 0 | 10 |

at Jack Murphy Stadium • San Diego, California

- Date: November 27, 1988
- Game time: 1:00 p.m. PST
- Game weather: 57 °F (14 °C); wind 6
- Game attendance: 51,848
- Referee: Ben Dreith
- TV announcers (CBS): Greg Gumbel (play–by–play) and Ken Stabler (color commentator)

| Team | Category | Player | Statistics |
|---|---|---|---|
| SF | Passing | Joe Montana | 14/22, 271 YDS, 3 TDs |
| SF | Rushing | Roger Craig | 17 CAR, 87 YDS, 2 TDs |
| SF | Receiving | Jerry Rice | 6 REC, 171 YDS, 2 TDs |
| SD | Passing | Mark Malone | 17/32, 136 YDS, 2 INTs |
| SD | Rushing | Gary Anderson | 14 CAR, 61 YDS |
| SD | Receiving | Rod Bernstine | 9 REC, 80 YDS |

Scoring summary

| Quarter | Time | Drive | | | Team | Scoring information | Score | |
| Quarter | Time | Plays | Yards | TOP | Team | Scoring information | SF | SD |
|---|---|---|---|---|---|---|---|---|
| 1 | 4:43 | 1 | 96 | | 49ers | Rice 96-yard touchdown reception from Montana, Cofer kick good | 7 | 0 |
| 2 | 12:01 | 3 | 23 | | 49ers | Craig 11-yard touchdown run, Cofer kick good | 14 | 0 |
| 2 | 10:20 | 4 | 65 | | Chargers | DeLine 36-yard touchdown run, Cofer kick good | 14 | 7 |
| 2 | 5:49 | 10 | 75 | | 49ers | Craig 2-yard touchdown reception from Montana, Cofer kick good | 21 | 7 |
| 2 | 0:00 | 5 | 35 | | 49ers | 45-yard field goal by Cofer | 24 | 7 |
| 3 | 13:30 | 5 | 76 | | 49ers | Rice 41-yard touchdown reception from Montana, Cofer kick good | 31 | 7 |
| 3 | 7:09 | 11 | 54 | | Chargers | 21-yard field goal by DeLine | 31 | 10 |
| 3 | 2:32 | 12 | 72 | | 49ers | Craig 7-yard touchdown run, Cofer kick good | 38 | 10 |
| 4 | 12:47 | 8 | 29 | | 49ers | 32-yard field goal by Cofer | 41 | 10 |
| 4 | 2:52 | 10 | 90 | | 49ers | DuBose 46-yard touchdown run, Cofer kick good | 48 | 10 |
| "TOP" = time of possession. For other American football terms, see Glossary of American football. | | | | | | | 48 | 10 |

- Point spread:
- Over/under:
- Time of game: 3 hours, 7 minutes

| 49ers | Game statistics | Chargers |
|---|---|---|
| 24 | First downs | 21 |
| 36–203 | Rushes–yards | 23–136 |
| 285 | Passing yards | 179 |
| 16–25–0 | Passes | 23–45–2 |
| 2–13 | Sacked–yards | 1–3 |
| 272 | Net passing yards | 176 |
| 475 | Total yards | 312 |
| 126 | Return yards | 172 |
| 3–42.3 | Punts | 4–42.8 |
| 1–0 | Fumbles–lost | 1–1 |
| 8–79 | Penalties–yards | 9–93 |
| 28:20 | Time of possession | 31:40 |

Individual stats

- Passing: Montana – 14/22, 271 YDS, 3 TDs; Young – 2/3, 14 YDS
- Rushing: Craig – 17 CAR, 87 YDS, 2 TDs; DuBose – 7 CAR, 60 YDS, 1 TD; Rathman – 5 CAR, 20 YDS; Montana – 2 CAR, 14 YDS; Sydney – 3 CAR, 13 YDS; Young – 2 CAR, 9 YDS
- Receiving: Rice – 6 REC, 171 YDS, 2 TDs; Rathman – 3 REC, 35 YDS; Greer – 2 REC, 19 YDS; Craig – 2 REC, 8 YDS, 1 TD; Frank – 1 REC, 38 YDS; Sydney – 1 REC, 9 YDS; Taylor – 1 REC, 5 YDS
- Kickoff returns: DuBose – 2 KR, 36 YDS; Taylor – 1 KR, 17 YDS
- Punt returns: Taylor – 3 PR, 22 YDS
- Punting: Helton – 3 PUNTS, 127 YDS
- Kicking: Cofer – 6/6 PAT, 2/2 FG
- Sacks: Stubbs – 1.0
- Interceptions: Lott – 1 INT, 44 YDS; McKyer – 1 INT, 7 YDS

The Niners' scoring explosion continued at Jack Murphy Stadium as Joe Montana threw three touchdowns (the first a 96-yarder to Jerry Rice) and Roger Craig had two rushing scores and a touchdown catch, while Doug DuBose added a rushing score. Four Niners backs plus both quarterbacks (Montana and Steve Young) rushed for 203 yards, crushing the Chargers 48–10.

=== Week 14 (Sunday, December 4, 1988): at Atlanta Falcons ===
Week 14: San Francisco 49ers at Atlanta Falcons – Game summary

| Quarter | 1 | 2 | 3 | 4 | Total |
|---|---|---|---|---|---|
| 49ers (9–5) | 0 | 7 | 0 | 6 | 13 |
| Falcons (5–9) | 0 | 0 | 0 | 3 | 3 |

at Atlanta–Fulton County Stadium • Atlanta, Georgia

- Date: December 4, 1988
- Game time: 10:00 a.m. PST
- Game weather: 49 °F (9 °C); wind 8
- Game attendance: 44,048
- Referee: Gordon McCarter
- TV announcers (CBS): Tim Brant (play–by–play) and Hank Stram (color commentator)

| Team | Category | Player | Statistics |
|---|---|---|---|
| SF | Passing | Joe Montana | 20/34, 230 YDS, 1 TD |
| SF | Rushing | Roger Craig | 23 CAR, 103 YDS |
| SF | Receiving | Roger Craig | 7 REC, 73 YDS |
| ATL | Passing | Chris Miller | 13/27, 156 YDS, 1 INT |
| ATL | Rushing | Gerald Riggs | 12 CAR, 17 YDS |
| ATL | Receiving | John Settle | 6 REC, 40 YDS |

Scoring summary

| Quarter | Time | Drive | | | Team | Scoring information | Score | |
| Quarter | Time | Plays | Yards | TOP | Team | Scoring information | SF | ATL |
|---|---|---|---|---|---|---|---|---|
| 2 | 1:04 | 12 | 81 | | 49ers | Rice 20-yard touchdown reception from Montana, Cofer kick good | 7 | 0 |
| 4 | 14:52 | 9 | 63 | | Falcons | 21-yard field goal by Davis | 7 | 3 |
| 4 | 7:25 | 13 | 51 | | 49ers | 31-yard field goal by Cofer | 10 | 3 |
| 4 | 1:48 | 9 | 35 | | 49ers | 23-yard field goal by Cofer | 13 | 3 |
| "TOP" = time of possession. For other American football terms, see Glossary of American football. | | | | | | | 13 | 3 |

- Point spread: 49ers –7
- Over/under: 41.0 (under)
- Time of game: 2 hours, 52 minutes

| 49ers | Game statistics | Falcons |
|---|---|---|
| 20 | First downs | 8 |
| 37–140 | Rushes–yards | 21–43 |
| 244 | Passing yards | 156 |
| 21–35–0 | Passes | 13–27–1 |
| 1–6 | Sacked–yards | 3–22 |
| 238 | Net passing yards | 134 |
| 378 | Total yards | 177 |
| 73 | Return yards | 41 |
| 3–44.7 | Punts | 6–44.8 |
| 2–0 | Fumbles–lost | 1–0 |
| 7–65 | Penalties–yards | 2–21 |
| 36:49 | Time of possession | 23:11 |

Individual stats

- Passing: Montana – 20/34, 230 YDS, 1 TD; Rice – 1/1, 14 YDS
- Rushing: Craig – 23 CAR, 103 YDS; Rathman – 7 CAR, 20 YDS; Rice – 1 CAR, 9 YDS; Montana – 5 CAR, 8 YDS; Sydney – 1 CAR, 0 YDS
- Receiving: Craig – 7 REC, 73 YDS; Rice – 5 REC, 63 YDS, 1 TD; Wilson – 3 REC, 49 YDS; Frank – 3 REC, 33 YDS; Greer – 1 REC, 16 YDS; Taylor – 1 REC, 10 YDS; Flagler – 1 REC, 0 YDS
- Kickoff returns: DuBose – 1 KR, 30 YDS
- Punt returns: Taylor – 5 PR, 40 YDS
- Punts: Helton – 3 PUNTS, 134 YDS
- Kicking: Cofer – 1/1 PAT, 2/4 FG
- Sacks: Haley – 1.0; Holt – 1.0; Stubbs – 1.0
- Interceptions: Fuller – 1 INT, 3 YDS
- 49ers Missed Field Goals: Cofer 23, 40

The Niners traveled to Fulton County Stadium and limited the Atlanta Falcons to 177 yards of offense in a 13–3 win.

=== Week 15 (Sunday, December 11, 1988): vs. New Orleans Saints ===
Week 15: New Orleans Saints at San Francisco 49ers – Game summary

| Quarter | 1 | 2 | 3 | 4 | Total |
|---|---|---|---|---|---|
| Saints (9–6) | 3 | 7 | 7 | 0 | 17 |
| 49ers (10–5) | 0 | 21 | 3 | 6 | 30 |

at Candlestick Park • San Francisco, California

- Date: December 11, 1988
- Game time: 1:00 p.m. PST
- Game weather: 62 °F (17 °C); (Drizzle) wind 5
- Game attendance: 62,977
- Referee: Red Cashion
- TV announcers (CBS): Pat Summerall (play–by–play) and John Madden (color commentator)

| Team | Category | Player | Statistics |
|---|---|---|---|
| NO | Passing | Bobby Hebert | 19/30, 170 YDS, 1 TD, 1 INT |
| NO | Rushing | Dalton Hilliard | 9 CAR, 35 YDS |
| NO | Receiving | Eric Martin | 7 REC, 61 YDS |
| SF | Passing | Joe Montana | 18/29, 233 YDS, 1 TD, 1 INT |
| SF | Rushing | Roger Craig | 22 CAR, 115 YDS, 1 TD |
| SF | Receiving | Jerry Rice | 6 REC, 78 YDS |

Scoring summary

| Quarter | Time | Drive | | | Team | Scoring information | Score | |
| Quarter | Time | Plays | Yards | TOP | Team | Scoring information | NO | SF |
|---|---|---|---|---|---|---|---|---|
| 1 | 10:36 | 3 | 3 | | Saints | 38-yard field goal by Andersen | 3 | 0 |
| 2 | 12:17 | 8 | 56 | | 49ers | Craig 1-yard touchdown run, Cofer kick good | 3 | 7 |
| 2 | 11:05 | 1 | 27 | | Saints | Hill 27-yard touchdown reception from Hilliard, Andersen kick good | 10 | 7 |
| 2 | 6:05 | 9 | 80 | | 49ers | Montana 2-yard touchdown run, Cofer kick good | 10 | 14 |
| 2 | 3:37 | 1 | 66 | | 49ers | Taylor 66-yard touchdown reception from Montana, Cofer kick good | 10 | 21 |
| 3 | 6:50 | 4 | 31 | | 49ers | 40-yard field goal by Cofer | 10 | 24 |
| 3 | 1:25 | 8 | 80 | | Saints | Scales 6-yard touchdown reception from Hebert, Andersen kick good | 17 | 24 |
| 4 | 11:53 | 9 | 43 | | 49ers | 43-yard field goal by Cofer | 17 | 27 |
| 4 | 9:18 | 4 | 3 | | 49ers | 19-yard field goal by Cofer | 17 | 30 |
| "TOP" = time of possession. For other American football terms, see Glossary of American football. | | | | | | | 17 | 30 |

- Point spread: 49ers –6
- Over/under: 41.0 (over)
- Time of game: 3 hours, 1 minute

| Saints | Game statistics | 49ers |
|---|---|---|
| 15 | First downs | 20 |
| 24–70 | Rushes–yards | 35–152 |
| 197 | Passing yards | 233 |
| 20–35–1 | Passes | 18–29–1 |
| 2–15 | Sacked–yards | 2–12 |
| 182 | Net passing yards | 221 |
| 252 | Total yards | 373 |
| 127 | Return yards | 79 |
| 5–38.2 | Punts | 3–36.7 |
| 2–1 | Fumbles–lost | 1–1 |
| 2–11 | Penalties–yards | 1–0 |
| 26:35 | Time of possession | 33:25 |

Starting Lineups

| Position | Starting Lineups – Week 15: vs. New Orleans |
|---|---|
Offense
| QB | #16 Joe Montana |
| RB | #33 Roger Craig |
| FB | #44 Tom Rathman |
| WR | #82 John Taylor |
| WR | #80 Jerry Rice |
| TE | #86 John Frank |
| LT | #74 Steve Wallace |
| LG | #61 Jesse Sapolu |
| C | #51 Randy Cross |
| RG | #62 Guy McIntyre |
| RT | #79 Harris Barton |
Defense
| LDE | #91 Larry Roberts |
| NT | #95 Michael Carter |
| RDE | #75 Kevin Fagan |
| LOLB | #94 Charles Haley |
| LILB | #55 Jim Fahnhorst |
| RILB | #99 Mike Walter |
| ROLB | #53 Bill Romanowski |
| LCB | #22 Tim McKyer |
| RCB | #29 Don Griffin |
| SS | #49 Jeff Fuller |
| FS | #42 Ronnie Lott |

Individual stats

49ers Passing
| | C/ATT^{1} | Yds | TD | INT | Sk | Yds | LG^{3} | Rate |
|---|---|---|---|---|---|---|---|---|
| Montana | 18/29 | 233 | 3 | 1 | 2 | 12 | 68 | 84.4 |

49ers Rushing
| | Car^{2} | Yds | TD | LG^{3} |
|---|---|---|---|---|
| Craig | 22 | 115 | 1 | 28 |
| Rathman | 7 | 19 | 0 | 555 |
| Montana | 6 | 18 | 1 | 11 |

49ers Receiving
| | Rec^{4} | Yds | TD | LG^{3} |
|---|---|---|---|---|
| Rice | 6 | 78 | 0 | 18 |
| Frank | 5 | 45 | 9 | 15 |
| Taylor | 2 | 77 | 1 | 68 |
| Rathman | 2 | 20 | 0 | 18 |
| Craig | 2 | 7 | 0 | 4 |
| Jones | 1 | 6 | 0 | 6 |

49ers Kick Returns
| | Ret | Yds | Y/Rt | TD | Lng |
|---|---|---|---|---|---|
| DuBose | 3 | 66 | 22.0 | 0 | 0 |

49ers Punt Returns
| | Ret | Yds | Y/Rt | TD | Lng |
|---|---|---|---|---|---|
| Taylor | 2 | 13 | 6.5 | 0 | 0 |

49ers Punting
| | Pnt | Yds | Y/P | Lng | Blck |
|---|---|---|---|---|---|
| Helton | 3 | 110 | 36.7 | 0 | 0 |

49ers Kicking
| | XPM–XPA | FGM–FGA |
|---|---|---|
| Cofer | 3–3 | 3–3 |

49ers Sacks
| | Sacks |
|---|---|
| Carter | 1.0 |
| Holt | 1.0 |

49ers Interceptions
| | Int | Yds | TD | LG | PD |
|---|---|---|---|---|---|
| Wright | 1 | 0 | 0 | 0 | 0 |

The Niners hosted the Saints with both teams at 9–5 but going in opposite directions following two straight Saints losses. Led by Roger Craig's 115 yards, the Niners rushed for 152 yards and two scores while Joe Montana threw for 233 yards and a score in San Francisco's 30–17 win. At halftime, the 49ers retired number 87, which was worn by Dwight Clark from 1979 to 1987.

=== Week 16: (Sunday, December 18, 1988) vs. Los Angeles Rams ===
Week 16: Los Angeles Rams at San Francisco 49ers – Game summary

| Quarter | 1 | 2 | 3 | 4 | Total |
|---|---|---|---|---|---|
| Rams (10–6) | 0 | 21 | 10 | 7 | 38 |
| 49ers (10–6) | 3 | 10 | 0 | 3 | 16 |

at Candlestick Park • San Francisco, California

- Date: December 18, 1988
- Game time: 5:00 p.m. PST
- Game weather: 50 °F (10 °C); (Cloudy) wind 6
- Game attendance: 62,444
- Referee: Gene Barth
- TV announcers (ESPN): Mike Patrick (play–by–play) and Joe Theismann (color commentator)

| Team | Category | Player | Statistics |
|---|---|---|---|
| LARams | Passing | Jim Everett | 19/38, 201 YDS, 4 TDs, 1 INT |
| LARams | Rushing | Greg Bell | 21 CAR, 88 YDS, 1 TD |
| LARams | Receiving | Henry Ellard | 6 REC, 74 TDS, 1 TD |
| SF | Passing | Joe Montana | 15/26, 171 YDS |
| SF | Rushing | Roger Craig | 16 CAR, 51 YDS |
| SF | Receiving | John Taylor | 5 REC, 54 YDS |

Scoring summary

| Quarter | Time | Drive | | | Team | Scoring information | Score | |
| Quarter | Time | Plays | Yards | TOP | Team | Scoring information | LARams | SF |
|---|---|---|---|---|---|---|---|---|
| 1 | 6:17 | 11 | 41 | | 49ers | 23-yard field goal by Cofer | 0 | 3 |
| 2 | 11:02 | 6 | 38 | | Rams | Johnson 16-yard touchdown reception from Everett, Lansford kick good | 7 | 3 |
| 2 | 5:23 | 12 | 77 | | 49ers | Rathman 1-yard touchdown run, Cofer kick good | 7 | 10 |
| 2 | 1:13 | 11 | 74 | | Rams | Ellard 9-yard touchdown reception from Everett, Lansford kick good | 14 | 10 |
| 2 | 0:20 | 2 | 19 | | Rams | Bell 1-yard touchdown run, Lansford kick good | 21 | 10 |
| 2 | 0:03 | 3 | 38 | | 49ers | 46-yard field goal by Cofer | 21 | 13 |
| 3 | 5:28 | 9 | 66 | | Rams | Johnson 11-yard touchdown reception from Everett, Lansford kick good | 28 | 13 |
| 3 | 2:40 | 6 | 15 | | Rams | 49-yard field goal by Lansford | 31 | 13 |
| 4 | 10:20 | 13 | 65 | | Rams | Johnson 5-yard touchdown reception from Everett, Lansford kick good | 38 | 13 |
| 4 | 0:09 | 8 | 66 | | 49ers | 36-yard field goal by Cofer | 38 | 16 |
| "TOP" = time of possession. For other American football terms, see Glossary of American football. | | | | | | | 38 | 16 |

- Point spread:
- Over/under:
- Time of game:

| Rams | Game statistics | 49ers |
|---|---|---|
| 23 | First downs | 20 |
| 30–121 | Rushes–yards | 21–70 |
| 201 | Passing yards | 291 |
| 19–38–1 | Passes | 22–37–0 |
| 0–0 | Sacked–yards | 9–45 |
| 201 | Net passing yards | 246 |
| 322 | Total yards | 316 |
| 84 | Return yards | 159 |
| 5–38.2 | Punts | 6–35.3 |
| 1–0 | Fumbles–lost | 2–1 |
| 5–33 | Penalties–yards | 7–58 |
| 31:28 | Time of possession | 28:32 |

Individual stats

- Passing: Montana – 15/26, 171 YDS; Young – 7/11, 120 YDS
- Rushing: Craig – 16 CAR, 51 YDS; Rathman – 2 CAR, 11 YDS, 1 TD; Young – 1 CAR, 9 YDS; Helton – 1 CAR, 0 YDS; Flagler – 1 CAR, –1 YD
- Receiving: Taylor – 5 REC, 54 YDS; Flagler – 3 REC, 72 YDS; Craig – 3 REC, 32 YDS; Rathman – 3 REC, 29 YDS; Wilson – 2 REC, 34 YDS; Rice – 2 REC, 29 YDS; Greer – 2 REC, 24 YDS; Heller – 1 REC, 10 YDS; Frank – 1 REC, 7 YDS
- Kickoff returns: Rodgers – 6 KR, 98 YDS; Sydney – 1 KR, 8 YDS
- Punt returns: Taylor – 3 PR, 53 YDS
- Punting: Helton – 6 PUNTS, 212 YDS
- Kicking: Cofer – 1/1 PAT, 3/3 FG
- Interceptions: McKyer – 1 INT, 0 YDS

The Niners clinched the NFC West despite a three-way tie with the Rams and New Orleans (all finishing 10–6) and despite a 38–16 slaughter by the Rams that put them into the playoffs. Jim Everett threw four touchdowns while Montana and Young combined for 291 yards but no scores. San Francisco won the division on tiebreakers and the Rams were the wild card, while the 10–6 Saints were eliminated from playoff contention on the conference record tiebreaker.

== Standings ==
NFC West
| | W | L | T | PCT | DIV | CONF | PF | PA | STK |
|---|---|---|---|---|---|---|---|---|---|
| ^{(2)} San Francisco 49ers | 10 | 6 | 0 | .625 | 4–2 | 8–4 | 369 | 294 | L1 |
| ^{(5)} Los Angeles Rams | 10 | 6 | 0 | .625 | 4–2 | 8–4 | 407 | 293 | W3 |
| New Orleans Saints | 10 | 6 | 0 | .625 | 3–3 | 6–6 | 312 | 283 | W1 |
| Atlanta Falcons | 5 | 11 | 0 | .313 | 1–5 | 4–8 | 244 | 315 | L3 |

== Regular season stats ==
Passing

Passing
| Player | Pos | G | GS | QBrec | Cmp | Att | Cmp% | Yds | TD | TD% | Int | Int% | Lng | Y/A | AY/A | Y/C | Y/G | Rate | Sk | Yds | NY/A | ANY/A | Sk% | 4QC | GWD |
|---|---|---|---|---|---|---|---|---|---|---|---|---|---|---|---|---|---|---|---|---|---|---|---|---|---|
| Montana | QB | 14 | 13 | 8–5–0 | 238 | 397 | 59.9 | 2981 | 18 | 4.5 | 10 | 2.5 | 96 | 7.5 | 7.3 | 12.5 | 212.9 | 87.9 | 34 | 223 | 7.9 | 6.40 | 6.19 | 2 | 2 |
| Young | QB | 11 | 3 | 2–1–0 | 54 | 101 | 53.5 | 680 | 3 | 3.0 | 3 | 3.0 | 73 | 6.7 | 6.0 | 12.6 | 61.8 | 72.2 | 13 | 75 | 11.4 | 5.31 | 4.65 | 1 | 1 |
| Rice | WR | 16 | 16 | | 1 | 3 | 33.3 | 14 | 0 | 0.0 | 1 | 33.3 | 14 | 4.7 | –10.3 | 14.0 | 0.9 | 9.7 | 0 | 0 | 0.0 | 4.67 | –10.33 | | |
| Sydney | RB | 16 | 0 | | 0 | 1 | 0.0 | 0 | 0 | 0.0 | 0 | 0.0 | 0 | 0.0 | 0.0 | | 0.0 | 39.6 | 0 | 0 | 0.0 | 0.00 | 0.00 | | |
| Team Total | | 16 | | 10–6–0 | 293 | 502 | 58.4 | 3675 | 21 | 4.2 | 14 | 2.8 | 96 | 7.3 | 6.9 | 12.5 | 229.7 | 83.5 | 47 | 298 | 8.6 | 6.15 | 5.77 | 3 | 3 |
| Opp Total | | 16 | | | 292 | 530 | 55.1 | 3284 | 25 | 4.7 | 22 | 4.2 | 67 | 6.2 | 5.27 | 11.2 | 205.3 | 72.2 | 42 | 297 | 7.3 | 5.2 | 4.4 | | |

Rushing

Rushing
| Player | Pos | G | GS | Att | Yds | TD | Lng | Y/A | Y/G | A/G |
|---|---|---|---|---|---|---|---|---|---|---|
| Craig | RB | 16 | 15 | 310 | 1502 | 9 | 46 | 4.8 | 93.9 | 19.4 |
| Rathman | FB | 16 | 16 | 102 | 427 | 2 | 26 | 4.2 | 26.7 | 6.4 |
| Young | QB | 11 | 3 | 27 | 184 | 1 | 49 | 6.8 | 16.7 | 2.5 |
| Montana | QB | 14 | 13 | 38 | 132 | 3 | 15 | 3.5 | 9.4 | 2.7 |
| DuBose | RB | 14 | 0 | 24 | 116 | 2 | 37 | 4.8 | 8.3 | 1.7 |
| Rice | WR | 16 | 16 | 13 | 107 | 1 | 29 | 8.2 | 6.7 | 0.8 |
| Sydney | RB | 16 | 0 | 9 | 50 | 0 | 13 | 5.6 | 3.1 | 0.6 |
| Flagler | RB | 3 | 0 | 3 | 5 | 0 | 4 | 1.7 | 1.7 | 1.0 |
| Helton | P | 15 | 0 | 1 | 0 | 0 | 0 | 0.0 | 0.0 | 0.1 |
| Team Total | | 16 | | 527 | 2523 | 18 | 49 | 4.8 | 157.7 | 32.9 |
| Opp Total | | 16 | | 441 | 1588 | 8 | | 3.6 | 99.3 | 27.6 |

Receiving

Receiving
| Player | Pos | G | GS | Rec | Yds | Y/R | TD | Lng | R/G | Y/G | Ctch% |
|---|---|---|---|---|---|---|---|---|---|---|---|
| Craig | RB | 16 | 15 | 76 | 534 | 7.0 | 1 | 22 | 4.8 | 33.4 | 0.0% |
| Rice | WR | 16 | 16 | 64 | 1306 | 20.4 | 9 | 96 | 4.0 | 81.6 | 0.0% |
| Rathman | FB | 16 | 16 | 42 | 382 | 9.1 | 0 | 24 | 2.6 | 23.9 | 0.0% |
| Wilson | WR | 16 | 11 | 33 | 405 | 12.3 | 3 | 31 | 2.1 | 2.53 | 0.0% |
| Frank | TE | 7 | 6 | 16 | 195 | 12.2 | 3 | 38 | 2.3 | 27.9 | 0.0% |
| Taylor | WR | 12 | 3 | 14 | 325 | 23.2 | 2 | 73 | 1.2 | 27.1 | 0.0% |
| Heller | TE | 16 | 9 | 14 | 140 | 10.0 | 0 | 22 | 0.9 | 8.8 | 0.0% |
| Greer | WR | 10 | 0 | 8 | 120 | 15.0 | 0 | 31 | 0.8 | 12.0 | 0.0% |
| Jones | TE | 11 | 0 | 8 | 57 | 7.1 | 2 | 18 | 0.7 | 5.2 | 0.0% |
| DuBose | RB | 14 | 0 | 6 | 57 | 9.5 | 0 | 13 | 0.4 | 4.1 | 0.0% |
| Flagler | RB | 3 | 0 | 4 | 72 | 18.0 | 0 | 57 | 1.3 | 24.0 | 0.0% |
| Chandler | WR | 4 | 4 | 4 | 33 | 8.3 | 0 | 9 | 1.0 | 8.3 | 0.0% |
| Sydney | RB | 16 | 0 | 2 | 18 | 9.0 | 0 | 9 | 0.1 | 1.1 | 0.0% |
| McIntyre | RG | 16 | 12 | 1 | 17 | 17.0 | 1 | 17 | 0.1 | 1.1 | 0.0% |
| Nicholas | WR | 7 | 0 | 1 | 14 | 14.0 | 0 | 14 | 0.1 | 2.0 | 0.0% |
| Team Total | | 16 | | 293 | 3675 | 12.5 | 21 | 96 | 18.3 | 229.3 | |
| Opp Total | | 16 | | 292 | 2987 | 10.2 | 25 | | 18.3 | 186.7 | |

Kicking

Kicking
| | | Games | | 0–19 | | 20–29 | | 30–39 | | 40–49 | | 50+ | | Scoring | | | | | | |
| Player | Pos | G | GS | FGA | FGM | FGA | FGM | FGA | FGM | FGA | FGM | FGA | FGM | FGA | FGM | Lng | FG% | XPA | XPM | XP% |
|---|---|---|---|---|---|---|---|---|---|---|---|---|---|---|---|---|---|---|---|---|
| Cofer | K | 16 | 0 | 1 | 1 | 10 | 9 | 11 | 9 | 11 | 7 | 5 | 1 | 38 | 27 | 52 | 71.1% | 41 | 40 | 97.6% |
| Team Total | | 16 | | 1 | 1 | 10 | 9 | 11 | 9 | 11 | 7 | 5 | 1 | 38 | 27 | | 71.1% | 41 | 40 | 97.6% |
| Opp Total | | 16 | | | | | | | | | | | | 24 | 18 | | 75.0% | 34 | 34 | 100.0% |

Punting

Punting
| Player | Pos | G | GS | Pnt | Yds | Lng | Blck | Y/P |
|---|---|---|---|---|---|---|---|---|
| Helton | P | 15 | 0 | 78 | 3069 | 53 | 1 | 39.3 |
| Runager | P | 1 | 0 | 1 | 24 | 24 | 0 | 24.0 |
| Team Total | | 16 | | 79 | 3093 | 53 | 1 | 39.2 |
| Opp Total | | 16 | | 86 | 3522 | | 0 | 41.0 |

Kick Return

Kick return
| Player | Pos | G | GS | Rt | Yds | TD | Lng | Y/Rt |
|---|---|---|---|---|---|---|---|---|
| DuBose | RB | 14 | 0 | 32 | 608 | 0 | 44 | 19.0 |
| Taylor | WR | 12 | 3 | 12 | 225 | 0 | 29 | 18.8 |
| Rodgers | RB | 1 | 0 | 6 | 98 | 0 | 24 | 16.3 |
| Craig | RB | 16 | 15 | 2 | 32 | 0 | 17 | 16.0 |
| Sydney | RB | 16 | 0 | 1 | 8 | 0 | 8 | 8.0 |
| Thomas | C | 16 | 0 | 1 | 5 | 0 | 5 | 5.0 |
| Wilson | WR | 16 | 11 | 1 | 2 | 0 | 2 | 2.0 |
| Team Total | | 16 | | 55 | 978 | 0 | 44 | 17.8 |
| Opp Total | | 16 | | 73 | 1362 | 0 | | 18.7 |

Punt Return

Punt return
| Player | Pos | G | GS | Rt | Yds | TD | Lng | Y/R |
|---|---|---|---|---|---|---|---|---|
| Taylor | WR | 12 | 3 | 55 | 556 | 2 | 95 | 12.6 |
| Chandler | WR | 4 | 4 | 6 | 28 | 0 | 13 | 4.7 |
| Griffin | RCB | 10 | 6 | 4 | 28 | 0 | 10 | 7.0 |
| Team Total | | 16 | | 54 | 612 | 2 | 95 | 11.3 |
| Opp Total | | 16 | | 47 | 426 | 0 | | 9.1 |

Sacks

Sacks

Interceptions

Interceptions

Fumbles

Fumbles

Tackles

Tackles

Scoring Summary

Scoring Summary

Team

| | San Francisco 49ers | Opponents |
|---|---|---|
| First downs | 326 | 277 |
| First downs rushing | 141 | 90 |
| First downs passing | 167 | 160 |
| First downs penalty | 18 | 27 |
| Third down efficiency | 94/225 | 88/225 |
| Fourth down efficiency | 5/10 | 6/16 |
| Net yards rushing | 2523 | 1588 |
| Rushing attempts | 527 | 441 |
| Yards per rush | 4.8 | 3.6 |
| Passing – Completions/attempts | 293/502 | 292/530 |
| Times sacked-total yards | 47–298 | 42–297 |
| Interceptions thrown | 14 | 22 |
| Net yards passing | 3377 | 2987 |
| Yards per pass | 6.2 | 5.2 |
| Total net yards | 5900 | 4575 |
| Punt returns-total yards | 54–612 | 47–426 |
| Kickoff returns-total yards | 55–978 | 73–1362 |
| Interceptions-total return yards | 22–88 | 14–185 |
| Punts-average yardage | 79–39.2 | 86–41.0 |
| Fumbles-lost | 27–12 | 30–14 |
| Penalties-total yards | 115–986 | 76–603 |
| Time of possession | 30:31 | 29:29 |
| Turnovers | 26 | 38 |

Quarter-by-quarter

Quarter-by-quarter
| Team | 1 | 2 | 3 | 4 | OT | T |
| 49ers | 54 | 140 | 95 | 80 | 0 | 369 |
| Opponents | 31 | 92 | 77 | 91 | 3 | 294 |

== Playoffs ==
| Week | Date | Opponent | Result | Record | Venue | Attendance | Recap |
|---|---|---|---|---|---|---|---|
| Divisional | January 1, 1989 | Minnesota Vikings (4) | W 34–9 | 1–0 | Candlestick Park | 61,848 | Recap |
| NFC Championship | January 8, 1989 | at Chicago Bears (1) | W 28–3 | 2–0 | Soldier Field | 66,946 | Recap |
| Super Bowl XXIII | January 22, 1989 | Cincinnati Bengals (A1) | W 20–16 | 3–0 | Joe Robbie Stadium | 75,129 | Recap |

=== 1988 NFC Divisional Playoffs (Sunday, January 1, 1989): vs. (4) Minnesota Vikings ===
NFC Divisional Playoffs: Minnesota Vikings at San Francisco 49ers – Game summary

| Quarter | 1 | 2 | 3 | 4 | Total |
|---|---|---|---|---|---|
| Vikings (1–1) | 3 | 0 | 6 | 0 | 9 |
| 49ers (1–0) | 7 | 14 | 0 | 13 | 34 |

at Candlestick Park • San Francisco, California

- Date: January 1, 1989
- Game time: 1:00 p.m. PST
- Game weather: 43 °F (6 °C); wind 9
- Game attendance: 61,848
- Referee: Jerry Markbreit
- TV announcers (CBS): Pat Summerall (play–by–play), John Madden (color commentator) and Will McDonough (sideline reporter)

| Team | Category | Player | Statistics |
|---|---|---|---|
| MIN | Passing | Wade Wilson | 23/47, 255 YDS, 2 INTs |
| MIN | Rushing | Rick Fenney | 6 CAR, 20 YDS |
| MIN | Receiving | Hassan Jones | 7 REC, 71 YDS |
| SF | Passing | Joe Montana | 16/27, 178 YDS, 3 TDs, 1 INT |
| SF | Rushing | Roger Craig | 21 CAR, 135 YDS, 2 TDs |
| SF | Receiving | Jerry Rice | 5 REC, 61 YDS, 3 TDs |

Scoring summary

| Quarter | Time | Drive | | | Team | Scoring information | Score | |
| Quarter | Time | Plays | Yards | TOP | Team | Scoring information | MIN | SF |
|---|---|---|---|---|---|---|---|---|
| 1 | 8:38 | 12 | 57 | | Vikings | 47-yard field goal by Nelson | 3 | 0 |
| 1 | 1:49 | 6 | 48 | | 49ers | Rice 1-yard touchdown reception from Montana, Cofer kick good | 3 | 7 |
| 2 | 14:56 | 4 | 30 | | 49ers | Rice 4-yard touchdown reception from Montana, Cofer kick good | 3 | 14 |
| 2 | 0:38 | 10 | 70 | | 49ers | Rice 11-yard touchdown reception from Montana, Cofer kick good | 3 | 21 |
| 3 | 9:42 | 8 | 61 | | Vikings | Jones 5-yard touchdown reception from Wilson, Nelson kick no good | 9 | 21 |
| 4 | 13:41 | 10 | 80 | | 49ers | Craig 4-yard touchdown run, Cofer kick good | 9 | 28 |
| 4 | 9:04 | 2 | 87 | | 49ers | Craig 80-yard touchdown run, Cofer kick no good | 9 | 34 |
| "TOP" = time of possession. For other American football terms, see Glossary of American football. | | | | | | | 9 | 34 |

- Point spread:
- Over/under:
- Time of game: 3 hours, 9 minutes

| Vikings | Game statistics | 49ers |
|---|---|---|
| 20 | First downs | 20 |
| 19–54 | Rushes–yards | 34–201 |
| 255 | Passing yards | 177 |
| 23–47–2 | Passes | 17–28–1 |
| 6–47 | Sacked–yards | 1–6 |
| 208 | Net passing yards | 171 |
| 262 | Total yards | 372 |
| 123 | Return yards | 76 |
| 7–39.3 | Punts | 5–36.2 |
| 1–1 | Fumbles–lost | 2–1 |
| 9–90 | Penalties–yards | 6–60 |
| 28:13 | Time of possession | 31:47 |

Individual stats

- Passing: Montana – 16/27, 178 YDS, 3 TDs, 1 INT; Young – 1/1, –1 YDS
- Rushing: Craig – 21 CAR, 135 YDS, 2 TDs; Rathman – 3 CAR, 29 YDS; Rice – 1 CAR, 21 YDS; Montana – 3 CAR, 18 YDS; Sydney – 1 CAR, 1 YD; Young – 3 CAR, 1 YD; Flagler – 2 CAR, –4 YDS
- Receiver: Rice – 5 REC, 61 YDS, 3 TDs; Taylor – 3 REC, 42 YDS; Craig – 3 REC, 26 YDS; Rathman – 2 REC, 20 YDS; Jones – 2 REC, 17 YDS; Wilson – 1 REC, 12 YDS; Harry Sydney – 1 REC, –1 YD
- Kickoff returns: Rodgers – 3 KR, 39 YDS
- Punt returns: Taylor – 2 PR, 27 YDS
- Punts: Helton – 5 PUNTS, 181 YDS
- Kicking: Cofer – 4/5 PAT, 0/1 FG
- Sacks: Roberts – 2.5; Haley – 1.5; Holt – 1.0; Stubbs – 1.0
- Interceptions: Lott – 2 INTs, 10 YDS
- 49ers Missed Field Goals: Cofer 60

For the third time in some 365 days the 49ers hosted the Vikings, and for the second time in that span it was in the playoffs. Minnesota entered having shot down the Rams 28–17 and boasting an offense fourth in scoring with a defense second in fewest points allowed with a plus-23 turnover differential – and none of it made any difference as Joe Montana threw three touchdowns in the first half and Jerry Rice caught all three. Wade Wilson was picked off twice as the Niners won 34–9, their first playoff win since Super Bowl XIX.

=== 1988 NFC Championship Game (Sunday, January 8, 1989): at (1) Chicago Bears ===
NFC Championship Game: San Francisco 49ers at Chicago Bears – Game summary

| Quarter | 1 | 2 | 3 | 4 | Total |
|---|---|---|---|---|---|
| 49ers (2–0) | 7 | 7 | 7 | 7 | 28 |
| Bears (1–1) | 0 | 3 | 0 | 0 | 3 |

at Soldier Field • Chicago, Illinois

- Date: January 8, 1989
- Game time: 1:00 p.m. PST
- Game weather: 20 °F (−7 °C); wind 29, wind chill 2 °F (−17 °C)
- Game attendance: 66,946
- Referee: Bob McElwee
- TV announcers (CBS): Pat Summerall (play–by–play), John Madden (color commentator) and Will McDonough (sideline reporter)

| Team | Category | Player | Statistics |
|---|---|---|---|
| SF | Passing | Joe Montana | 17/27, 288 YDS, 3 TDs |
| SF | Rushing | Roger Craig | 18 CAR, 68 YDS |
| SF | Receiving | Jerry Rice | 5 REC, 133 YDS, 2 TDs |
| CHI | Passing | Jim McMahon | 14/29, 121 YDS, 1 INT |
| CHI | Rushing | Neal Anderson | 14 CAR, 59 YDS |
| CHI | Receiving | Neal Anderson | 5 REC, 31 YDS |

Scoring summary

| Quarter | Time | Drive | | | Team | Scoring information | Score | |
| Quarter | Time | Plays | Yards | TOP | Team | Scoring information | SF | CHI |
|---|---|---|---|---|---|---|---|---|
| 1 | 3:42 | 3 | 62 | | 49ers | Rice 61-yard touchdown reception from Montana, Cofer kick good | 7 | 0 |
| 2 | 7:25 | 7 | 64 | | 49ers | Rice 27-yard touchdown reception from Montana, Cofer kick good | 14 | 0 |
| 2 | 3:06 | 9 | 46 | | Bears | 25-yard field goal by Butler | 14 | 3 |
| 3 | 9:33 | 13 | 78 | | 49ers | Frank 5-yard touchdown reception from Montana, Cofer kick good | 21 | 3 |
| 4 | 6:53 | 12 | 70 | | 49ers | Rathman 4-yard touchdown run, Cofer kick good | 28 | 3 |
| "TOP" = time of possession. For other American football terms, see Glossary of American football. | | | | | | | 28 | 3 |

- Point spread:
- Over/under:
- Time of game: 3 hours, 2 minutes

| 49ers | Game statistics | Bears |
|---|---|---|
| 21 | First downs | 15 |
| 37–138 | Rushes–yards | 25–91 |
| 288 | Passing yards | 176 |
| 17–27–0 | Passes | 20–41–1 |
| 2–20 | Sacked–yards | 0–0 |
| 268 | Net passing yards | 176 |
| 406 | Total yards | 267 |
| 60 | Return yards | 90 |
| 6–34.5 | Punts | 7–31.4 |
| 1–1 | Fumbles–lost | 2–1 |
| 0–0 | Penalties–yards | 3–35 |
| 31:03 | Time of possession | 28:57 |

Individual stats

- Passing: Montana – 17/27, 288 YDS, 3 TDs
- Rushing: Craig – 18 CAR, 68 YDS; Rathman – 10 CAR, 36 YDS, 1 TD; Montana – 3 CAR, 12 YDS; Sydney – 2 CAR, 12 YDS; Flagler – 3 CAR, 7 YDS; Rice – 1 CAR, 3 YDS
- Receiving: Rice – 5 REC, 133 YDS, 2 TDs; Rathman – 5 REC, 51 YDS; Taylor – 3 REC, 51 YDS; Craig – 2 REC, 33 YDS; Frank – 2 REC, 20 YDS, 1 TD
- Kickoff returns: Taylor – 1 KR, 22 YDS Sydney – 1 KR, 14 YDS
- Punt returns: Taylor – 4 PR, 24 YDS
- Punting: Helton – 6 PUNTS, 207 YDS
- Kicking: Cofer – 4/4 PAT
- Interceptions: Fuller – 1 INT, 0 YDS

The Niners traveled to frigid Soldier Field a week after the Bears succeeded in the Fog Bowl against the Eagles and less than three months after San Francisco's ugly Monday Night loss in that same venue. The Niners put the game away in the third quarter following Joe Montana's third touchdown of the game as the Niners limited the Bears' sluggish offense (18th in scoring) to just one Kevin Butler field goal. The win was doubly personal for Walsh between returning to the Super Bowl and also quieting hecklers in the Soldier Field crowd, including one in particular who'd persisted in what Walsh delicately described as "remarks about my body parts and my preferences in life", but who was reduced to futile stuttering as the game got out of hand.

=== Super Bowl XXIII (Sunday, January 22, 1989): vs. (A1) Cincinnati Bengals ===
Super Bowl XXIII: Cincinnati Bengals vs. San Francisco 49ers – Game summary

| Quarter | 1 | 2 | 3 | 4 | Total |
|---|---|---|---|---|---|
| Bengals (2–1) | 0 | 3 | 10 | 3 | 16 |
| 49ers (3–0) | 3 | 0 | 3 | 14 | 20 |

at Joe Robbie Stadium •, Miami Gardens, Florida

- Date: January 22, 1989
- Game time: 2:18 p.m. PST
- Game weather: 72 °F (22 °C); wind 17
- Game attendance: 75,129
- Referee: Jerry Seeman
- TV announcers (NBC): Dick Enberg (play–by–play), Merlin Olsen (color commentator) and Jim Gray (sideline reporter)

| Team | Category | Player | Statistics |
|---|---|---|---|
| CIN | Passing | Boomer Esiason | 11/25, 144 YDS, 1 INT |
| CIN | Rushing | Ickey Woods | 20 CAR, 79 YDS |
| CIN | Receiving | Cris Collinsworth | 3 REC, 40 YDS |
| SF | Passing | Joe Montana | 23/36, 357 YDS, 2 TDs |
| SF | Rushing | Roger Craig | 17 CAR, 71 YDS |
| SF | Receiving | Jerry Rice | 11 REC, 215 YDS, 1 TD |

Scoring summary

| Quarter | Time | Drive | | | Team | Scoring information | Score | |
| Quarter | Time | Plays | Yards | TOP | Team | Scoring information | CIN | SF |
|---|---|---|---|---|---|---|---|---|
| 1 | 3:14 | 13 | 73 | 5:02 | 49ers | 41-yard field goal by Cofer | 0 | 3 |
| 2 | 1:15 | 6 | 28 | 2:49 | Bengals | 34-yard field goal by Breech | 3 | 3 |
| 3 | 5:39 | 13 | 61 | 9:21 | Bengals | 43-yard field goal by Breech | 6 | 3 |
| 3 | 0:50 | 4 | 8 | 1:30 | 49ers | 32-yard field goal by Cofer | 6 | 6 |
| 3 | 0:34 | — | — | — | Bengals | Jennings 93-yard kickoff return for a touchdown, Breech kick good | 13 | 6 |
| 4 | 14:03 | 4 | 85 | 1:31 | 49ers | Rice 14-yard touchdown reception from Montana, Cofer kick good | 13 | 13 |
| 4 | 3:20 | 11 | 46 | 5:27 | Bengals | 40-yard field goal by Breech | 16 | 13 |
| 4 | 0:34 | 11 | 92 | 2:46 | 49ers | Taylor 10-yard touchdown reception from Montana, Cofer kick good | 16 | 20 |
| "TOP" = time of possession. For other American football terms, see Glossary of American football. | | | | | | | 16 | 20 |

- Point spread: 49ers –7
- Over/under:
- Time of game: 3 hours, 24 minutes

| Bengals | Game statistics | 49ers |
|---|---|---|
| 13 | First downs | 23 |
| 28–106 | Rushes–yards | 28–111 |
| 144 | Passing yards | 357 |
| 11–25–1 | Passes | 23–36–0 |
| 5–21 | Sacked–yards | 3–14 |
| 123 | Net passing yards | 343 |
| 229 | Total yards | 454 |
| 137 | Return yards | 133 |
| 5–44.2 | Punts | 4–37.0 |
| 1–0 | Fumbles–lost | 4–1 |
| 7–65 | Penalties–yards | 4–32 |
| 32:43 | Time of possession | 27:17 |

Individual stats

- Passing: Montana – 23/36, 357 YDS, 2 TDs
- Rushing: Craig – 17 CAR, 71 YDS, Rathman – 5 CAR, 23 YDS; Montana – 4 CAR, 13 YDS; Rice – 1 CAR, 5 YDS
- Receiving: Rice – 11 REC, 215 YDS, 1 TD; Craig – 8 REC, 101 YDS; Frank – 2 REC, 15 YDS; Rathman – 1 REC, 16 YDS; Taylor – 1 REC, 10 YDS, 1 TD
- Kickoff returns: Rodgers – 3 KR, 53 YDS; Taylor – 1 KR, 13 YDS; Sydney – 1 KR, 11 YDS
- Punt returns: Taylor – 3 PR, 56 YDS
- Punting: Helton – 4 PUNTS, 148 YDS
- Kicking: Cofer – 2/2 PAT, 2/4 FG
- Sacks: Haley – 2.0; Carter – 1.0; Fagan – 1.0; Stubbs – 1.0
- Interceptions: Romanowsi – 1 INT, 0 YDS
- 49ers Missed Field Goals: Cofer 19, 49

The game is remembered for the 49ers' fourth-quarter game-winning drive. Down 16–13, San Francisco got the ball on their own eight-yard line with 3:10 on the clock and marched 92 yards down the field in under three minutes. They then scored the winning touchdown on a Joe Montana pass to John Taylor with just 34 seconds left in the game.

49ers wide receiver Jerry Rice was named the Super Bowl MVP. He caught 11 passes for a Super Bowl record 215 yards and one touchdown, while also rushing once for 5 yards.

This was also the final NFL game coached by the 49ers' Bill Walsh. This was also the final Super Bowl that Pete Rozelle presided over as NFL Commissioner.

== Playoff Stats ==
Passing

Passing
| Player | Pos | G | GS | QBrec | Cmp | Att | Cmp% | Yds | TD | TD% | Int | Int% | Lng | Y/A | AY/A | Y/C | Y/G | Rate | Sk | Yds | NY/A | ANY/A | Sk% | 4QC | GWD |
|---|---|---|---|---|---|---|---|---|---|---|---|---|---|---|---|---|---|---|---|---|---|---|---|---|---|
| Montana | QB | 3 | 3 | 3–0 | 56 | 90 | 62.2 | 823 | 8 | 8.9 | 1 | 1.1 | 61 | 0.1 | 7.3 | 12.5 | 274.3 | 117.0 | 7 | 42 | 7.9 | 6.40 | | 1 | 1 |
| Young | QB | 2 | 0 | | 1 | 1 | 100.0 | –1 | 0 | 3.0 | 0 | 0.0 | -1 | 6.7 | –1.0 | 12.6 | –1.0 | 79.2 | 0 | 0 | 11.4 | 5.31 | | | |
| Team Total | | 3 | | 3–0 | 57 | 91 | | 822 | 8 | | 1 | | 61 | | | | | | 7 | 42 | | | | 1 | 1 |
| Opp Total | | 3 | | | 54 | 113 | | 575 | 1 | | 4 | | 23 | | | | | | 11 | 68 | | | | | |

Rushing

Receiving

Kicking

Punting

Kick Return

Punt Return

Sacks

Interceptions

Fumbles

Tackles

Scoring Summary

Team

| | San Francisco 49ers | Opponents |
|---|---|---|
| First downs | 64 | 48 |
| First downs rushing | 22 | 19 |
| First downs passing | 39 | 27 |
| First downs penalty | 3 | 2 |
| Third down efficiency | 18/39 | 12/44 |
| Fourth down efficiency | 0/0 | 3/6 |
| Net yards rushing | 451 | 251 |
| Rushing attempts | 98 | 72 |
| Yards per rush | 4.6 | 3.5 |
| Passing – Completions/attempts | 57/91 | 54/113 |
| Times sacked-total yards | 7–42 | 11–68 |
| Interceptions thrown | 1 | 4 |
| Net yards passing | 780 | 501 |
| Yards per pass | 9.0 | 5.0 |
| Total net yards | 1231 | 752 |
| Punt returns-total yards | 9–107 | 6–33 |
| Kickoff returns-total yards | 10–152 | 14–317 |
| Interceptions-total return yards | 4–10 | 1–0 |
| Punts-average yardage | 15–35.7 | 19–37.7 |
| Fumbles-lost | 7–3 | 4–2 |
| Penalties-total yards | 6–60 | 19–190 |
| Time of possession | 30:02 | 29:58 |
| Turnovers | 4 | 6 |

Quarter-by-quarter

Quarter-by-quarter
| Team | 1 | 2 | 3 | 4 | T |
| 49ers | 17 | 21 | 10 | 34 | 82 |
| Opponents | 3 | 3 | 13 | 3 | 22 |

== Awards and records ==
- Mike Cofer, Led NFC, 27 Field Goals
- Mike Cofer, Led NFC, 121 Points
- Roger Craig, Offense, UPI NFC Player of the Year
- Roger Craig, Led NFC with 2068 total yards
- Jerry Rice, Most Valuable Player, Super Bowl XXIII

== 1989 AFC-NFC Pro Bowl ==
| Number | Player | Position | Conference |
|---|---|---|---|
| 95 | Michael Carter | NT | NFC Pro Bowlers |
| 33 | Roger Craig | RB, Starter | NFC Pro Bowlers |
| 94 | Charles Haley | LB–DE | NFC Pro Bowlers |
| 42 | Ronnie Lott | FS, Starter | NFC Pro Bowlers |
| 80 | Jerry Rice | WR, Did Not Play | NFC Pro Bowlers |
| 82 | John Taylor | KR | NFC Pro Bowlers |

== Media ==
Pre season Local TV

| Channel | Play-by-play | Color commentator(s) |
|---|---|---|
| KPIX-TV 5 | Wayne Walker | Bill Ring |

=== Local Radio ===
| Flagship station | Play-by-play | Color commentator(s) | Sideline reporter (s) | Studio host |
|---|---|---|---|---|
| KGO 810 | Lon Simmons (Pre Season, Week 1–5 and 8–16, Playoffs and Super Bowl XXIII); Joe Starkey (Week 6–7) | Wayne Walker (Pre Season Week 1–2, Regular Season, Playoffs and Super Bowl XXIII); Joe Starkey (Pre Season Weeks 3–5) | Joe Starkey (Pre Season Week 1–2, Week 1–5 and 8–16, Playoffs and Super Bowl XXIII) | Joe Starkey |
