= Larry Roberts (American football) =

American football player (1963–2016)

No. 91
- Position: Defensive end

Personal information
- Born: June 2, 1963; Dothan, Alabama, U.S.
- Died: December 5, 2016 (aged 53); Atlanta, Georgia, U.S.
- Listed height: 6 ft 3 in (1.91 m)
- Listed weight: 270 lb (122 kg)

Career information
- High school: Northview (Dothan)
- College: Alabama
- NFL draft: 1986: 2nd round, 39th overall pick

Career history
- San Francisco 49ers (1986–1993)

Awards and highlights
- 2× Super Bowl champion (XXIII, XXIV)

Career NFL statistics
- Sacks: 28
- Interceptions: 1
- Fumble recoveries: 2
- Stats at Pro Football Reference

Larry P. Roberts (June 2, 1963 – December 5, 2016) was an American professional football player who was a defensive end for the San Francisco 49ers of the National Football League (NFL). He played college football for the Alabama Crimson Tide. He won two Super Bowls with the 49ers.

== Career ==
Roberts was born in Dothan, Alabama, and began his football career at Northview High School in Dothan. He subsequently starred as a defensive end at the University of Alabama. In Round 2 of the 1986 NFL draft, at 6’3" and 264 lbs, Roberts was drafted as the 39th overall pick. Roberts played eight consecutive seasons for the San Francisco 49ers, from 1986 to 1993. As a defensive lineman, Roberts was a part of the starting lineup in Super Bowl XXIII against the Cincinnati Bengals in 1989, and in Super Bowl XXIV against the Denver Broncos in 1990. Roberts also participated in 12 playoff games during his tenure with the 49ers.

== Personal life ==
Roberts resided in Atlanta with his wife and their two children. He died on December 5, 2016, at the age of 53. He was diagnosed with diabetes in his later years, which led to the amputation of both of his legs.

== Professional statistics ==
Year	Team	G	GS	SK	YDS	LNG	FR	AV
1986	San Francisco 49ers	16	2	5.5	0	0	1	3
1987	San Francisco 49ers	11	2	2.5	0	0	0	2
1988	San Francisco 49ers	16	16	6.0	0	0	0	8
1989	San Francisco 49ers	15	5	3.5	0	0	1	4
1990	San Francisco 49ers	6	0	1.0	0	0	0	1
1991	San Francisco 49ers	16	9	7.0	0	0	0	6
1992	San Francisco 49ers	3	0	1.0	19.0	19.0	0	1
1993	San Francisco 49ers	6	0	1.5	0	0	0	1
Total	(8 years)	89	34	28	19	19	2	26
