= John Frank (tight end) =

American football player (born 1962)

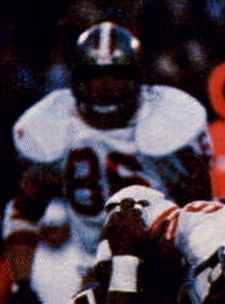
- Frank with the San Francisco 49ers during the 1985 NFC Wild Card Game

No. 86
- Position: Tight end

Personal information
- Born: April 17, 1962 (age 64); Pittsburgh, Pennsylvania, U.S.
- Listed height: 6 ft 3 in (1.91 m)
- Listed weight: 225 lb (102 kg)

Career information
- High school: Mt. Lebanon (Mt. Lebanon, Pennsylvania)
- College: Ohio State
- NFL draft: 1984: 2nd round, 56th overall pick

Career history
- San Francisco 49ers (1984–1988)

Awards and highlights
- 2× Super Bowl champion (XIX, XXIII); Second-team All-American (1983); 2× First-team All-Big Ten (1982-1983); Second-team All-Big Ten (1981)

Career NFL statistics
- Receptions: 65
- Receiving yards: 662
- Receiving touchdowns: 10
- Stats at Pro Football Reference

John E. Frank (born April 17, 1962) is an American former professional football player who was a tight end for the San Francisco 49ers of the National Football League (NFL) from 1984 to 1988. He played college football for the Ohio State Buckeyes. Frank was selected by the 49ers in the second round of the 1984 NFL draft, and won two Super Bowls with the team. After his football career, he became a hair restoration surgeon.

== Early life ==
Frank was born in Pittsburgh, Pennsylvania, the son of Barbara and Alan Frank. He graduated from Mt Lebanon High School in 1980. During high school, he volunteered in the surgical laboratory of Dr Thomas Starzl, the "Father of Modern Transplantation", part of a team that performed the world's first liver transplant.

== College career ==
While at Ohio State, John Frank was the starting tight end from 1981 to 1983 and caught more passes than any other tight end in the history of the school. He was honored as a two-time Academic All-American, became the team's most valuable player, and was selected as a member of the All-Century Ohio State Football Team and Ohio State's Varsity Hall of Fame.

As a senior, Frank was named a second-team All-American by both Gannett News Service (GNS) and the Newspaper Enterprise Association (NEA).

As an undergraduate, he co-authored several research papers investigating the best treatments for pediatric croup and the work was published in the Laryngoscope.

While finishing at Ohio State, he was invited to attend the Combine in Indianapolis in 1984, but declined in order to continue studying for his final exams. He was drafted in the second round of the NFL draft by the San Francisco Forty Niners and in June 1984 he graduated with a Bachelor of Arts in chemistry from Ohio State.

=== College statistics ===
- 1980: 5 catches for 65 yards.
- 1981: 45 catches for 449 yards and 3 TD.
- 1982: 26 catches for 326 yards and 2 TD.
- 1983: 45 catches for 641 yards and 4 TD.

== Medical school ==
Frank had already been accepted into several medical schools, but decided to enroll at Ohio State University College of Medicine because they had an independent study program which allowed flexibility to continue playing in the NFL while completing the first year of medical school. They also offered a deferred enrollment into medical school, but Frank chose to attend medical school during the NFL off-seasons.

During medical school, he continued researching diseases of the head and neck and microvascular surgery and the Gait Analysis laboratory.

== Professional football career ==
Frank was selected in the second round of the 1984 NFL draft by the San Francisco 49ers. During his first season, he played as a reserve tight end behind Russ Francis, and as a specialist, while the team went 18–1 as they defeated the Miami Dolphins in Super Bowl XIX. He injured his left elbow during the NFC Championship victory over the Chicago Bears, and therefore saw limited time in Super Bowl XIX.

During his five-year career, he caught 65 passes for 662 yards and became the starting tight end during his fourth and fifth seasons. In Super Bowl XXIII he caught two passes, including a key pass thrown by Joe Montana during the winning touchdown drive.

Following the game and during what was considered to be the height of his professional football career, he announced his retirement to devote himself full-time to medical school. The vacated tight end position was filled by future All-Pro tight end Brent Jones in 1989. The 49ers also drafted Wesley Walls in the second round of the 1989 draft.

== After the NFL ==
After retiring from football, Frank earned his M.D. from Ohio State in 1992. He is an otolaryngologist, board-certified by the American Board of Otolaryngology and the American Board Of Hair Restoration Surgery. He became a Fellow of the American College of Surgeons, an assistant professor of Clinical Otolarygology at Columbia University College of Physicians and Surgeons and The Ohio State University College of Medicine-adjunct. He has performed over 2,500 hair transplant procedures in New York, California and Ohio. In 2006 he opened Anapelli Hair Clinic in New York City, which has since been renamed to John Frank MD Hair Clinics, and expanded the practice to Columbus, Ohio, in 2014. At both offices, Frank specializes in non-surgical hair restoration and surgical hair transplantation, as well as biocapillation. He has three children.

== See also ==
- List of select Jewish football players
