= Barry Helton =

American football player (born 1965)

No. 9
- Position: Punter

Personal information
- Born: January 2, 1965 (age 61); Colorado Springs, Colorado, U.S.
- Listed height: 6 ft 3 in (1.91 m)
- Listed weight: 205 lb (93 kg)

Career information
- High school: Simla (Simla, Colorado)
- College: Colorado
- NFL draft: 1988: 4th round, 102nd overall pick

Career history
- San Francisco 49ers (1988–1991); Los Angeles Rams (1991)

Awards and highlights
- 2× Super Bowl champion; 2× Consensus All-American (1985, 1986); Second-team All-American (1987); 3× First-team All-Big Eight (1985, 1986, 1987)

Career NFL statistics
- Punts: 213
- Punting yards: 8,285
- Longest punt: 56
- Average punt: 38.9
- Stats at Pro Football Reference

Barry Bret Helton (born January 2, 1965) is an American former professional football player who was a punter for four seasons in the National Football League (NFL) during the 1980s and 1990s. He played college football for the Colorado Buffaloes, twice earning consensus All-American honors. He was selected by the San Francisco 49ers in fourth round of the 1988 NFL draft with the 102nd overall pick. He played in the NFL for San Francisco and Los Angeles Rams, playing in Super Bowl XXIII and Super Bowl XXIV for the 49ers.

Helton was born in Colorado Springs, Colorado. He attended the University of Colorado Boulder, where he played for the Buffaloes from 1984 to 1987.

Helton's son Bret is also a professional athlete, pitching in the Pittsburgh Pirates' minor league system. He and his wife Lisa had three more children, Chad, Brad and Nicole.
