= Michael Walter (American football) =

American football player (born 1960)

Mike Walter
No. 59, 99
- Position: Linebacker

Personal information
- Born: November 30, 1960 (age 65); Salem, Oregon, U.S.
- Listed height: 6 ft 3 in (1.91 m)
- Listed weight: 240 lb (109 kg)

Career information
- High school: Sheldon (Eugene, Oregon)
- College: Oregon
- NFL draft: 1983: 2nd round, 50th overall pick

Career history
- Dallas Cowboys (1983); San Francisco 49ers (1984–1993)

Awards and highlights
- 3× Super Bowl champion (XIX, XXIII, XXIV); Second-team All-Pro (1989); First-team All-Pac-10 (1982)

Career NFL statistics
- Sacks: 8
- Fumble recoveries: 7
- Interceptions: 2
- Stats at Pro Football Reference

Michael David Walter (born November 30, 1960) is an American former professional football player who was a linebacker in the National Football League (NFL) for the San Francisco 49ers and Dallas Cowboys. He played college football for the Oregon Ducks.

== Early life ==
Walter attended Sheldon High School, where he focused on basketball, playing just one year of football. He was also a member of the track team. He was named the most valuable player in the state's football All-star game.

Walter attended the University of Oregon where he was used as a linebacker, before being moved to defensive end as a sophomore.

As a senior, he became the first-team captain in head coach Rich Brooks' first six years at Oregon. He registered 13 sacks (led the team) and 18 tackles for loss (led the team). He also played in the East–West Shrine Game and the Japan Bowl.

== Professional career ==
=== Dallas Cowboys ===
Walter was selected by the Dallas Cowboys in the second round (50th overall) of the 1983 NFL draft, with the intention of converting him into an outside linebacker. In his new position he struggled covering the pass, so he wasn't used often. On August 27, 1984, he was waived at the end of training camp, after the Cowboys drafted four linebackers in the 1984 NFL draft.

=== San Francisco 49ers ===
On August 28, 1984, he was claimed off waivers by the San Francisco 49ers who moved him to inside linebacker, as the backup of Jack "Hacksaw" Reynolds.

In 1985, he became a starter, showing the versatility to play three downs on defense and also special teams. He would go on to have a 10-year career with the 49ers, while leading the team in tackles in three consecutive seasons: 1987 (94), 1988 (97) and 1989 (103).

Walter wasn't re-signed for the 1994 season and was replaced by free agent Ken Norton Jr. He retired after winning three Super Bowls and playing 11 years in the NFL.

== Personal life ==
After football, he worked at Oak Tree Insurance. He has two daughters—a doctor and a business development executive, named Sarah and Allison.
