= Jeff Fuller (safety) =

American football player (born 1962)

No. 49
- Position: Safety

Personal information
- Born: August 8, 1962 (age 64); Dallas, Texas, U.S.
- Listed height: 6 ft 2 in (1.88 m)
- Listed weight: 216 lb (98 kg)

Career information
- High school: Franklin D. Roosevelt (Dallas, Texas)
- College: Texas A&M
- NFL draft: 1984: 5th round, 139th overall pick

Career history
- San Francisco 49ers (1984–1989)

Awards and highlights
- 3× Super Bowl champion (XIX, XXIII, XXIV)

Career NFL statistics
- Sacks: 9
- Interceptions: 10
- Fumble recoveries: 5
- Stats at Pro Football Reference

Jeffery Avery Fuller (born August 8, 1962) is an American former professional football player who was a safety for the San Francisco 49ers of the National Football League (NFL) from 1984 to 1989. He played college football for the Texas A&M Aggies. He won three Super Bowls as a member of the 49ers.

Fuller suffered a career-ending spinal injury in October 1989 against the New England Patriots at Stanford Stadium. The game was played at Stanford University due to the Loma Prieta earthquake that damaged Candlestick Park. Hall of Fame safety Ronnie Lott stated that Jeff Fuller was one of the hardest hitting safeties in the NFL. While he is able to walk, he is no longer able to use one of his arms.

Fuller's son, Jeffrey Fuller, played in the Canadian Football League.
