= Harry Sydney =

American football player (born 1959)

No. 24, 42
- Position: Running back

Personal information
- Born: June 26, 1959 (age 67); Petersburg, Virginia, U.S.
- Listed height: 6 ft 0 in (1.83 m)
- Listed weight: 217 lb (98 kg)

Career information
- High school: Seventy-First (Fayetteville, North Carolina)
- College: Kansas
- NFL draft: 1981: undrafted

Career history
- Seattle Seahawks (1981)*; Cincinnati Bengals (1982)*; Denver Gold (1983–1984); Memphis Showboats (1985); Montreal Alouettes (1986); San Francisco 49ers (1987–1991); Green Bay Packers (1992)
- * Offseason or practice squad member only

Awards and highlights
- 3× Super Bowl champion (XXIII, XXIV, XXXI)

Career NFL statistics
- Rushing yards: 805
- Rushing average: 4.2
- Rushing touchdowns: 9
- Stats at Pro Football Reference

Harry Flanroy Sydney III (born June 26, 1959) is an American former professional football player who was a running back in the National Football League (NFL) and the United States Football League (USFL). He played college football for the Kansas Jayhawks. Sydney played six seasons in the NFL for the San Francisco 49ers and Green Bay Packers after three years in the USFL with the Denver Gold and Memphis Showboats. He now resides in Green Bay, Wisconsin, where he operates a not-for-profit male mentoring program called "My Brother's Keeper," and was the head football coach of the West High School Wildcats.

== Highlights ==
Harry Sydney played on the 1988 and 1989 San Francisco 49ers Super Bowl championship teams. He was the captain of the special teams. He earned another Super Bowl ring as running backs coach for the 1996 Green Bay Packers. He served as RB Coach from 1995 to 1999. He is also 11th all-time in rushing yards for the USFL.

Sydney is the only NFL player who has caught touchdown passes from both Joe Montana and Brett Favre.

== Post-career life ==
Harry is also a public speaker as well as co-host of a Green Bay, Wisconsin sports radio show.

Harry Sydney started his own Male Mentoring Business called My Brother's Keeper. It mentors almost all ages of boys to men who are having issues with life struggles.
