= Pierce Holt =

American football player (born 1962)

No. 78, 95
- Positions: Defensive end, defensive tackle

Personal information
- Born: January 1, 1962 (age 64); Marlin, Texas, U.S.
- Listed height: 6 ft 4 in (1.93 m)
- Listed weight: 275 lb (125 kg)

Career information
- High school: Lamar Consolidated (Rosenberg, Texas)
- College: Angelo State
- NFL draft: 1988: 2nd round, 39th overall pick

Career history
- San Francisco 49ers (1988–1992); Atlanta Falcons (1993–1995)

Awards and highlights
- 2× Super Bowl champion (XXIII, XXIV); Second-team All-Pro (1992); Pro Bowl (1993); PFWA All-Rookie Team (1988)

Career NFL statistics
- Games played: 109
- Games started: 91
- Sacks: 37
- Stats at Pro Football Reference
- College Football Hall of Fame

Leslie Pierce Holt (born January 1, 1962) is an American former professional football player who was a defensive lineman for the San Francisco 49ers and Atlanta Falcons of the National Football League (NFL) from 1988 to 1995. Holt played college football at Angelo State University. He was selected by the 49ers in the second round of the 1988 NFL draft. Holt was selected to his one and only Pro Bowl in 1992, his last year in San Francisco. He won two Super Bowls with the 49ers. The following year in March, Holt signed with the Atlanta Falcons for three years worth $7.5 million. He lives with his wife, Deana, in Christoval, Texas.
