= Doug DuBose =

American football player (born 1964)

No. 25, 40
- Position: Running back

Personal information
- Born: March 14, 1964 (age 62); New London, Connecticut, U.S.
- Listed height: 5 ft 11 in (1.80 m)
- Listed weight: 190 lb (86 kg)

Career information
- High school: Montville (Oakdale, Connecticut)
- College: Nebraska (1982–1986)
- NFL draft: 1987: undrafted

Career history
- San Francisco 49ers (1987–1988); San Francisco 49ers (1991)*; Sacramento Surge (1992)
- * Offseason or practice squad member only

Awards and highlights
- Super Bowl champion (XXIII); World Bowl champion (1992); Second-team All-American (1985); 2× First-team All-Big Eight (1984, 1985)

Career NFL statistics
- Rushing yards: 149
- Rushing average: 4.4
- Touchdowns: 2
- Return yards: 608
- Stats at Pro Football Reference

Donald Douglas DuBose (born March 14, 1964) is an American former professional football player who was a running back in the National Football League (NFL). He played college football for the Nebraska Cornhuskers and was a Heisman Trophy candidate before missing his entire senior year due to injury. He then played two seasons in the NFL with the San Francisco 49ers, and was a member of the 49ers team that won Super Bowl XXIII. He was banned from the NFL for one year after testing positive for cocaine for the third time. DuBose later played for the Sacramento Surge of the World League of American Football (WLAF).

== Early life ==
Donald Douglas DuBose was born on March 14, 1964, in New London, Connecticut. He played football, basketball, and baseball at Montville High School in Oakdale, Connecticut, earning all-state honors in all three sports.

== College career ==
DuBose played college football for the Nebraska Cornhuskers of the University of Nebraska–Lincoln. He rushed three times for four yards in 1982. He was listed as the team's No. 3 tailback during the 1983 preseason. DuBose ended up redshirting the 1983 season while Nebraska's No. 1 running back, Mike Rozier, won the Heisman Trophy. DuBose was then a two-year letterman from 1984 to 1985. He rushed 156 times for 1,040 yards and eight touchdowns in 1984 while also catching eight passes for 105 yards, earning Associated Press (AP) and United Press International (UPI) first-team All-Big Eight Conference honors. His 1,040 rushing yards were the most in the Big Eight that season. As a junior in 1985, DuBose recorded 203 carries for 1,161 yards and eight touchdowns, and five receptions for 65 yards. For the 1985 season, he garnered AP and UPI first-team All-Big Eight, and UPI second-team All-American recognition. Going into his senior year, DuBose was considered a Heisman Trophy candidate. However, he had knee surgery in spring 1986 and missed the entire 1986 season. DuBose majored in public relations at Nebraska. He received $19,700 from agents during his college career, which was against NCAA rules.

== Professional career ==
Pre-draft measurables
Height	Weight	Arm length	Hand span	Bench press
5 ft 11 in (1.80 m)	191 lb (87 kg)	29 1/2 in (0.75 m)	8 3/4 in (0.22 m)	11 reps
All values from NFL Combine

=== San Francisco 49ers ===
DuBose attended the 1987 NFL Scouting Combine but did not run the 40-yard dash due to his knee injury. Traces of cocaine were found in his urine sample at the combine, lowering his draft stock. He signed with the San Francisco 49ers on June 30, 1987, after going undrafted in the 1987 NFL draft. He was placed on injured reserve on September 8 with a shoulder injury and activated on October 12, 1987. He was one of the few NFL players who did not strike during the 1987 NFL players strike. He played in two games for the 49ers during the 1987 season, rushing ten times for 33 yards while also catching four passes for 37 yards, before being placed on injured reserve again on December 17, 1987.

After a July 1988 exhibition game in London, DuBose tested positive for cocaine again and was suspended for 30 days. He played in 14 games the next year in 1988, totaling 24 carries for 116 yards and two touchdowns, six receptions for 57 yards, and 32 kick returns for 608 yards. He suffered a season-ending knee injury on December 11, 1988, against the New Orleans Saints. On January 22, 1989, the 49ers won Super Bowl XXIII against the Cincinnati Bengals by a score of 20–16.

DuBose was waived by the 49ers on May 2, 1989. His knee was surgically repaired on August 16, 1989. DuBose was banned from the NFL for one year after testing positive for cocaine for the third time.

DuBose signed with the 49ers on April 25, 1991. He was released on May 31, 1991, with a 49ers representative stating "Doug's been out of football almost three years and we wanted to give the younger players some playing time at training camp."

=== Sacramento Surge ===
In February 1992, DuBose was selected by the Sacramento Surge of the World League of American Football (WLAF) in a supplemental draft. He played for the Surge during the 1992 WLAF season, rushing 62 times for 253 yards and three touchdowns while catching eight passes for 51 yards. On June 6, 1992, the Surge won World Bowl '92 against the Orlando Thunder 21–17.

== Later life ==
DuBose has two children. He worked at Cherenzia Excavation from 2000 to 2002 but was fired for "repeated absenteeism". He has been involved in numerous legal incidents, including a 2005 third-degree robbery charge for stealing a fish from a supermarket. DuBose was inducted into the Nebraska Football Hall of Fame as part of the class of 2020.
