= Camden Catholic High School =

Catholic high school in New Jersey, US

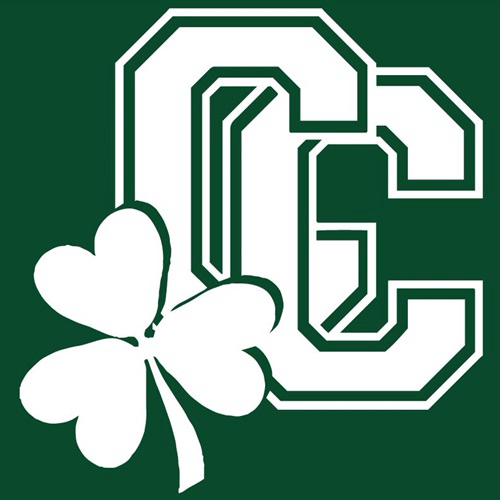

Location
- 300 Cuthbert Boulevard; Cherry Hill, Camden County, New Jersey 08002; United States; 39°56′20″N 75°3′7″W

Information
- Type: Private, parochial
- Motto: Honor, Faith, Loyalty
- Religious affiliation: Roman Catholic
- Established: 1887
- School district: Diocese of Camden
- NCES School ID: 00864796
- President: James I. Hozier
- Dean: James Keough
- Principal: Heather Crisci
- Faculty: 54.3 FTEs
- Grades: 9–12
- Gender: Coeducational
- Student to teacher ratio: 12.8:1
- Campus size: 33-acre (130,000 m^{2})
- Colors: Green and white
- Athletics conference: Olympic Conference
- Team name: Irish
- Rival: Camden High School
- Accreditation: Middle States Association of Colleges and Schools
- Tuition: $12,465 (2025-26)
- Alumni: 18,710
- Website: www.camdencatholic.org

Camden Catholic High School (CCHS) is a four-year comprehensive private coeducational Roman Catholic high school, located in the Philadelphia metropolitan area in Cherry Hill, Camden County, in the U.S. state of New Jersey. The school operates under the supervision of the Roman Catholic Diocese of Camden. The school has been accredited by the Middle States Association of Colleges and Schools Commission on Elementary and Secondary Schools since 1934. Camden Catholic students come from the local area and from Norway, Nigeria, Italy, Germany, Mexico, Vietnam, Korea, and China. Many of these students live on campus in the Nazareth House, a convent re-purposed to accommodate foreign students with full-time care-providers on staff, while others live with host families in the surrounding area.

As of the 2019–20 school year, the school had an enrollment of 695 students and 54.3 classroom teachers (on an FTE basis), for a student–teacher ratio of 12.8:1. The school's student body was 63.5% (441) White, 13.5% (94) Hispanic, 11.1% (77) Black, 8.6% (60) Asian, 3.2% (22) two or more races and 0.1% (1) Native Hawaiian/ Pacific Islander.

== History ==
When the Cathedral of the Immaculate Conception was built in 1862, space was set aside for the first parochial school in the city of Camden, which became the origin of the current high school. In 1920, the existing elementary school program was extended to include a four-year, high school program graduating 15 girls and 6 boys in June 1921. Camden Catholic High School opened in 1924 with an enrollment of 400 students.

After a fire on April 17, 1960, destroyed two buildings at the Camden campus, a decision was made that a new school would be constructed on a 33-acre (130,000 m^{2}) site in Delaware Township (now Cherry Hill).

In the 2012–13 school year, Camden Catholic celebrated its 125th anniversary as a school.

== Sports ==
The Camden Catholic High School Irish participate in the Olympic Conference, which is comprised of public and private high schools located in Burlington County and Camden County, and operates under the supervision of the New Jersey State Interscholastic Athletic Association. With 504 students in grades 10-12, the school was classified by the NJSIAA for the 2022–24 school years as Non-Public Group A for most athletic competition purposes (equivalent to Group II for public schools). The football team competes in the Constitution Division of the 94-team West Jersey Football League superconference and was classified by the NJSIAA as Non-Public Group B (equivalent to Group I/II for public schools) for football for 2024–2026, which included schools with 140 to 686 students.

The school participates in a joint ice hockey team with Paul VI High School as the host school / lead agency. The co-op program operates under agreements scheduled to expire at the end of the 2023–24 school year.

The boys basketball team won the Non-Public A state title in 1941 (vs. St. Patrick High School of Elizabeth), 1942 (vs. Saint Joseph of the Palisades High School), 2001 (vs. Seton Hall Preparatory School), 2003 (vs. Bergen Catholic High School) and 2010 (vs. St. Peter's Preparatory School of Jersey City). The 1941 team scored in the final seconds of the game to win the Group 2 (since recategorized as Non-Public A) state title with a 42–39 win against St. Patrick's in the championship game played at the Elizabeth Armory. The 2010 team won the Non-Public A state title with a 68–63 victory in the championship game against St. Peter's at the Ritacco Center and advanced into the Tournament of Champions as the top seed, defeating fourth seed Cherokee High School by a score of 47–34 in the semifinals before falling to number-two seed Trenton Catholic by 63–46 in the finals to finish the season with a record of 29–2.

The boys track team won the Non-Public Group A spring / outdoor track state championship in 1957 and 1962.

The boys' baseball team won the Non-Public A state championship in 1973, defeating Seton Hall Preparatory School in the tournament final.

The 1979 football team finished the season with a 9–2 record after winning the NJSIAA Non-Public A South state sectional title with a 20–7 victory against Holy Cross Preparatory Academy in the championship game, a turnaround from team's 0-9 record in 1978. The school has had a football rivalry since 1931 with Camden High School. Camden Catholic leads the series with an overall record of 35-29-2 through the 2017 season. NJ.com listed the rivalry as 28th on its 2017 list "Ranking the 31 fiercest rivalries in N.J. HS football"

The wrestling team won the Non-Public A South state sectional championship in 1980, 1994-2014 and 2018-2020. The team won the Non-Public A title in 1996, 1999-2002, 2004, 2005, 2007-2010 and won the Non-Public B title in 2011-2013, 2019, 2020 and 2023. The program's 17 state group championships are ranked third in the state.

The girls' field hockey team won the South Jersey Group III state sectional championships in 1981, 1984 and 1985, won the South Jersey Group II title in 2001, 2002, 2007 and 2012, won the Central Jersey Group II title in 2011, and won the Non-Public South title in 2019, 2021 and 2022. The team won the Group III state championship in 1985 (defeating Cranford High School in the tournament final) and the Non-Public state title in 2022 and 2023 (vs. Oak Knoll School of the Holy Child both years). In 2007, the field hockey team won the South Jersey, Group II state sectional championship with a 5–3 win over West Deptford High School in the tournament final. The team won the 2022 Non-Public state championship with a 2-1 win in the tournament final against Oak Knoll School of the Holy Child.

The girls' softball team won the Non-Public A state championships in 1986 vs. Paramus Catholic High School and won in 1990, 1991 and 1992, defeating Immaculate Heart Academy in the tournament finals all three years.

The girls swimming team won the Division B state championship in 1990, 1991 and 1993, and won the Division B title in 1994.

The girls soccer team won the 1990 Group III state title as co-champion with Ramapo High School in a scoreless tie after regulation and overtime to finish the season with a record of 18-2-2.

The wrestling team won the 2007 Group A state championship, defeating Don Bosco Preparatory High School 32–25 to take the title.

Wrestler Taylor Walsh, now wrestling at Indiana University, won the 2010 NJSIAA 145-pound championship defeating Frank Crocco of Passaic Valley Regional High School in the final. He had won the 2009 NJSIAA 135-pound championship defeating two-time runner up Kodie Silvestri of Walkill Valley. He placed second at 119 pounds in 2008 losing in the finals to two-time champion Vinnie Dellefave of Toms River East. Wrestler Anthony Trongone won the NJSIAA 171-pound championship in 2007. Trongone was a runner-up in 2005–06 season. Previous state champions from Camden Catholic are Bobby Stinson (in the 130 lb (59 kg). weight class in 2002) and Ed Giosa (125 lb. in 2003).

The boys' cross country team, under the coaching leadership of Dennis Quinn and Ralph Harris, took the division championship on October 10, 2007, beating Paul VI High School and ending Paul VI's 28-year, 244 match dual meet winning streak.

The boys' winter track team won the Non-Public Group B division state relay title in 2014.

== Notable alumni ==
- Don Amendolia (born 1944), actor
- Olivia Bent-Cole (born 2005, class of 2023) field hockey forward who has played for the United States women's national field hockey team
- William T. Cahill (1912–1996), Governor of New Jersey and United States Representative
- Don Casey (born 1937), former professional and collegiate basketball coach who was head coach in the NBA for the Los Angeles Clippers and New Jersey Nets
- Bill Conaty (born 1973), former NFL player
- James A. Corea (1937–2001), radio personality and specialist in nutrition, rehabilitation and sports medicine
- Krysten Cummings (born 1974/75, class of 1992), film and stage actress who appeared as Tina in the 1997 production of The Fix, and as Mimi in the 1998 version of the musical Rent
- William J. Fallon (born 1944), United States Navy Admiral who is the former Commander of United States Central Command
- Tom Flacco (born 1994), quarterback for the Saskatchewan Roughriders of the Canadian Football League, who transferred after one year
- Andy Gaskill (born 1951), animator, art director, and storyboard artist at Walt Disney Animation Studios, whose work includes Winnie the Pooh and Tigger Too, The Rescuers, The Fox and the Hound, The Little Mermaid, and The Lion King
- Zach Hicks (born 2003), basketball player for the Boston Celtics
- James John Hogan (1911–2005), Bishop of the Roman Catholic Diocese of Altoona-Johnstown from 1966–1986
- George Lehmann (1942–2024), National Basketball Association player
- John McCarthy (1916–1998; class of 1935), College All-American in 1941 at Saint Francis University, Loretto, Pennsylvania and former starting quarterback in National Football League
- Don McComb (1934–2018), defensive end who played for the Boston Patriots of the American Football League in the 1960 season
- George V. Murry, S.J. (1948–2020), Bishop of the Roman Catholic Diocese of Youngstown, installed in 2007
- Joseph A. Mussomeli (born 1952), diplomat who was United States Ambassador to Slovenia and United States Ambassador to Cambodia
- Kevin Owens (born 1980), professional basketball player who has played for the Cairns Taipans of the National Basketball League in Australia
- Jamal Parker (born 1998), professional gridiron football defensive back for the Winnipeg Blue Bombers of the Canadian Football League
- Scott Pilarz, S.J. (1959–2021), president of Marquette University and the University of Scranton
- Thomas J. Shusted (1926–2004, class of 1944), attorney and politician who served in the New Jersey General Assembly on two separate occasions, representing Legislative District 3D from 1970 to 1972 and the 6th Legislative District from 1978 to 1991
- Joseph C. Strasser (1940–2019, class of 1958), rear admiral of the United States Navy who served a tour as President of the Naval War College
- Theresa Anne Tull (born 1936), diplomat who served as the United States Ambassador to Guyana (1987–1990) and Brunei from 1993 until 1996
- Cris Vaccaro (born 1958; class of 1976), former professional soccer player
- Tara Vittese (born 1995), field hockey player who was added to the United States women's national field hockey team
- Barbara Walden (born 1930), founded one of the first American cosmetic companies offering products for Black women to be sold in major department stores
- Kevin D. Walsh, attorney who is the acting New Jersey State Comptroller
