= Greg Mark =

American football player and coach (born 1967)

No. 94, 91
- Position: Defensive end

Personal information
- Born: July 7, 1967 (age 59); Cherry Hill, New Jersey, U.S.
- Listed height: 6 ft 3 in (1.91 m)
- Listed weight: 252 lb (114 kg)

Career information
- High school: Pennsauken (Pennsauken Township, New Jersey)
- College: Miami
- NFL draft: 1990: 3rd round, 79th overall pick

Career history

Playing
- New York Giants (1990)*; Philadelphia Eagles (1990); Miami Dolphins (1990); Los Angeles Raiders (1991)*; Cleveland Browns (1991)*
- * Offseason or practice squad member only

Coaching
- Miami (FL) (1992) (GA); Utah State (1995) (DL); Miami (FL) (1996-2005) (DL)

Awards and highlights
- As player: 2× National champion (1987, 1989); Consensus All-American (1989); As coach: National champion (2001)

Career NFL statistics
- Games played: 6
- Stats at Pro Football Reference

Gregory S. Mark (born July 7, 1967) is an American former professional football player who was a defensive end and linebacker in the National Football League (NFL). He was selected by the New York Giants in the third round of the 1990 NFL draft. He played college football at Miami. Mark played in the NFL for the Philadelphia Eagles and Miami Dolphins. Mark was a defensive line coach for the Hurricanes from 1996 to 2005.

Born in Cherry Hill, New Jersey, Mark grew up in Merchantville and played football at Pennsauken High School.

== College career ==
Mark played college football at the University of Miami for the Miami Hurricanes. Mark was one of the players in Jimmy Johnson's first recruiting class. From 1986 to 1989, Greg Mark anchored one of the most punishing defensive lines in University of Miami football history, as well as in college football. Mark's five-year career at Miami culminated with First-team All-America honors by Kodak and the Associated Press in 1989, as well as a semifinalist nod for the prestigious Lombardi Award. Mark was also selected to play in both the Hula Bowl in Hawaii and East/West Shrine Game in Palo Alto, CA. Mark was also an important part of two national championship teams at UM, in 1987 and 1989. He finished his career with an overall record of 55–5, 35 starts, 253 tackles, 95 quarterback pressures and 34.5 total sacks. His sack total currently ranks him 2nd on the all-time UM career sack list. Mark was a player on teams that went to 5 New Year's Day bowl 2 Sugar Bowl, 2 Orange Bowl and 1 Fiesta Bowl.

== Professional career ==
Mark was selected by Bill Parcels of the New York Giants in the third round of the 1990 NFL draft with the 79th overall pick. While with the Giants he was moved to the interior line and asked to play a two gap nose guard. He was released by the Giants at the end of pre-season camp and quickly was signed by the Miami Dolphins. Don Shula, head coach of the Dolphins attempted to transform Mark into a middle linebacker once arriving into their Davie, FL facilities. Despite losing almost 40 lbs in a short time and playing a big role on special teams Mark was assigned to the waiver wire where he was intended to move to the Dolphins practice squad. Before clearing waivers Mark was picked up by the Philadelphia Eagles where he was moved back to his nature position of Defensive End. Mark appeared in six games for the Eagles and Miami Dolphins. While playing a road game against the Dallas Cowboys, Mark suffered a season ending shoulder injury. After attempting to finish the season with the injury he was assigned to the IR list and subsequently released. After off season shoulder surgery He later signed with the L.A. Raiders and finished with the Cleveland Browns. However, he never played a game for either the Raiders or Browns

== Coaching career ==
After his playing career in the NFL, Mark returned to the Miami Hurricanes in 1992 as a graduate assistant. In 1995, he was hired by Utah State to be their defensive line coach. The next year, he returned to the Hurricanes to be their defensive line coach in 1996. He held the positions until he was fired at midseason in 2005. He was a coaching staff member of the 2001 National Championship team. His efforts in coaching resemble those as a player, when he oversaw a group in 2001 that was a vital part of the Hurricanes' drive to the National Championship. Greg Mark, the UM defensive linemen, spearheaded a defense that led the nation in scoring defense, pass efficiency defense and turnover margin while ranking in the top 10 nationally in five statistical categories. During Mark's coaching tenure at The U he was able to develop and guide players like Warren Sapp, Kenny Holmes, Kenard Lang, Dwayne "The Rock" Johnson, Vince Wilfork, Jerome McDougal, Jamaal Greene, William Joseph and Calais Campbell.
