= Kevin Walsh =

Kevin Walsh may refer to:

- Kevin Walsh (English footballer) (1928–2012), English football wing half
- Kevin Walsh (Australian rules footballer) (born 1962), former Australian rules footballer
- Kevin Walsh (Gaelic footballer) (born 1969), Irish Gaelic football manager and former player
- Kevin Walsh (bowls) (born 1969), Australian lawn bowler
- Kevin D. Walsh, American attorney and acting New Jersey State Comptroller
- Kevin J. Walsh (born 1975), American film producer
- Kevin Walsh (boxer) (born 1992), American professional boxer
- Kevin Walsh (neuropsychologist), Australian pioneer of the profession of clinical neuropsychology
- Kevin Walsh (politician) (1925–2017), Canadian politician
- Kevin Walsh (born 1958), American journalist and founder of Forgotten NY
