= Zach Hicks =

American basketball player (born 2003)

No. 24 – Neftçi SC
- Position: Forward
- League: Azerbaijan Basketball League

Personal information
- Born: April 22, 2003 (age 23) Camden, New Jersey, U.S.
- Listed height: 6 ft 8 in (2.03 m)
- Listed weight: 200 lb (91 kg)

Career information
- High school: Camden Catholic (Cherry Hill, New Jersey)
- College: Temple (2021–2023); Penn State (2023–2025)
- NBA draft: 2025: undrafted
- Playing career: 2025–present

Career history
- 2025–2026: UCAM Murcia CB
- 2026: South Bay Lakers
- 2026–present: Neftçi SC

Career highlights
- AAC All-Freshman Team (2022)

Zachariah Charles Hicks (born April 22, 2003) is an American professional basketball player for the Neftçi SC of the Azerbaijan Basketball League. He played college basketball for the Temple Owls and Penn State Nittany Lions.

== High school career ==
Hicks attended Camden Catholic High School. He averaged 20 points and 9 rebounds per game as a junior. Hicks scored a career-high 38 points and had 15 rebounds in a 75-58 win against Paul VI High School. He earned second-team all-state honors as a senior. Hicks committed to play college basketball at Temple.

== College career ==
Hicks began his college basketball career at Temple, where he played two seasons and was named to the AAC All-Freshman Team in 2022. On December 22, 2021, he scored a career-high 35 points including a school-record 10 three-pointers in a 85-48 win over Delaware State. As a freshman, Hicks averaged 8.3 points and 4.1 rebounds per game. He averaged 9.6 points and 5.1 rebounds per game as a sophomore. Hicks transferred to Penn State for his junior season. He averaged 8.4 points and 3.9 rebounds per game as a junior and made a team-high 67 three-pointers. As a senior, Hicks averaged 11.6 points, 4.9 rebounds, 2.0 assists and 1.1 steals per game.

== Professional career ==
Hicks joined the Boston Celtics summer league team for the 2025 NBA Summer League.

On September 27, 2025, Hicks signed with UCAM Murcia CB. Joining UCAM Murcia CB, based in Spain, was his first professional basketball experience and first in Europe.

On January 21, 2026, Hicks was acquired by the South Bay Lakers from the NBA G League Player Pool. In the 2025-26 season, his first season in the G-League playing with South Bay, Hicks appeared in 15 games and averaged 2.8 points, 1.7 rebounds, and 0.6 assists per game.
