= Pennsauken High School =

High school in Camden County, New Jersey, US

Location
- 800 Hylton Road; Pennsauken Township, Camden County, New Jersey 08110; United States; 39.988014°N 75.028871°W

Information
- Type: Public high school
- Established: September 1959
- School district: Pennsauken Public Schools
- NCES School ID: 341287001610
- Principal: Richard Bonkowski
- Faculty: 103.0 FTEs
- Grades: 9-12
- Enrollment: 1,588 (as of 2024–25)
- Student to teacher ratio: 15.4:1
- Colors: Scarlet and Columbia Blue
- Athletics conference: Burlington County Scholastic League (general); West Jersey Football League (football)
- Team name: Indians
- Website: high.pennsauken.net

Pennsauken High School is a four-year comprehensive public high school in Pennsauken Township, Camden County, in the U.S. state of New Jersey, serving students in ninth through twelfth grades as the lone secondary school of the Pennsauken Public Schools.

As of the 2024–25 school year, the school had an enrollment of 1,588 students and 103.0 classroom teachers (on an FTE basis), for a student–teacher ratio of 15.4:1. There were 1,026 students (64.6% of enrollment) eligible for free lunch and 152 (9.6% of students) eligible for reduced-cost lunch.

== History ==
Constructed at a planned cost of $3.5 million (equivalent to $40.1 million in 2025) the school opened in September 1959 with students in ninth and tenth grades. Prior to the completion of the high school, Pennsauken students had been sent to schools outside the township at Merchantville High School.

Students from Merchantville had attended the high school as part of a sending/receiving relationship that began in 1972, when the borough's high school was closed. In 1992 Merchantville considered severing its send-receive relationship with Pennsauken School District so Merchantville could send them to Haddonfield Memorial High School instead, on the grounds that Merchantville saw Pennsauken High as outdated and Haddonfield Memorial as having superior facilities. Merchantville officials publicly stated in the 1980s and 1990s that they felt Pennsauken High had too many students and was too large. John Ellis, the New Jersey State Commissioner of Education, blocked Merchantville leaving the partnership on the grounds that it would cause more white students to leave Pennsauken High and turn Pennsauken High into a majority minority school. The Pennsauken District sought to recommit to ties with Merchantville.

In the wake of a 2015 decision by the New Jersey Department of Education, Merchantville students began attending Haddon Heights Junior/Senior High School starting in the 2015–2016 school year, as part of a transition that was fully in place in the 2018–2019 school year. Merchantville School District leaders argued that their decision to switch was due to low Annual Yearly Progress (AYP) rates at Pennsauken High. Dissatisfaction with Pennsauken High had, in the 2010s, created a campaign to have Merchantville borough merged into Cherry Hill, which would have also taken students from the borough area out of the Pennsauken High attendance zone.

== Awards, recognition and rankings ==
The school was the 298th-ranked public high school in New Jersey out of 339 schools statewide in New Jersey Monthly magazine's September 2014 cover story on the state's "Top Public High Schools", using a new ranking methodology. The school had been ranked 310th in the state of 328 schools in 2012, after being ranked 298th in 2010 out of 322 schools listed. The magazine ranked the school 290th in 2008 out of 316 schools. The school was ranked 292nd in the magazine's September 2006 issue, which surveyed 316 schools across the state.

== Athletics ==
The Pennsauken High School Indians participate in the Burlington County Scholastic League, which is comprised of public and private high schools located in Burlington County and operates under the supervision of the New Jersey State Interscholastic Athletic Association (NJSIAA). With 944 students in grades 10-12, the school was classified by the NJSIAA for the 2019–20 school year as Group III for most athletic competition purposes, which included schools with an enrollment of 761 to 1,058 students in that grade range. The football team competes in the Liberty Division of the 94-team West Jersey Football League superconference and was classified by the NJSIAA as Group IV South for football for 2024–2026, which included schools with 890 to 1,298 students.

The football team won the South Jersey Group IV state sectional championships in 1980, 1984, 1986 and 2011. In 1980, the team finished the season with a 10-1 record after winning the South Jersey Group IV state sectional championship with a 14-0 victory against Willingboro High School. The 1986 team finished with an 11-0 record after earning the South Jersey Group IV title with a 27-0 win against Cherokee High School in the tournament final. The 1986 team finished the season with an 11-0 record and was ranked 15th in the nation by USA Today after winning the South Jersey Group IV state sectional title with a 29-6 win against previously unbeaten Toms River High School South in front of 5,000 spectators in Toms River.

The girls' bowling team was the 1994 overall state champion.

The girls' track team won the indoor track Group IV state championship in 2000.

The boys' basketball team won the Central, Group IV state sectional championship in 2004 with an 83-59 victory in the championship game against Steinert High School.

The boys' track team won the Group III spring / outdoor track state championship in 2016 and 2021.

The boys' track team won the Group III state indoor relay championship in 2018 (as co-champion).

== Marching band ==
The school's marching band was Tournament of Bands Chapter One Champions in 1982 (Group 3) and 1985–1987 (Group 4). The band won the New Jersey state championships in 2008 Group 3 open, with the highest score of every band there.

Also, the school's marching band won state championships, Chapter One championships, and Atlantic Coast Class A championships in 2011 with their show titled "Side Show".

Pennsauken Indoor Drumline Ensemble won in 2015 at a Winter Guard International Regional in Open Class with a score of 98.5. In 2017 Pennsauken Indoor Guard went to WGI Championships for the first time in over a decade to Dayton, Ohio. They received 6th place out of 64 other color guards from around the world in their Independent A class.

== Administration ==
The school's principal is Richard Bonkowski. His administration team includes four assistant principals.

== Notable alumni ==
- Suzanne Cloud (born 1951), jazz singer, writer and teacher
- Al Fisher (born 1986), basketball player for Kent State University
- David Griggs (1967–1995), outside linebacker who played in the NFL for the San Diego Chargers
- Dwight Hicks (born 1956), retired San Francisco 49ers player and Super Bowl winner
- Yaxel Lendeborg (born 2002), basketball player for the Golden State Warriors team
- Greg Mark (born 1967), former defensive end and linebacker who played in the NFL for the Philadelphia Eagles and Miami Dolphins
- Todd McNair (born 1965), USC Trojans football coach and former NFL running back for the Kansas City Chiefs and Houston Oilers
- George Norcross (born 1956), businessman and political leader
- Delia Parr, author of historical fiction
- Allen Payne (born 1968), actor
- Steven M. Petrillo (born 1958, class of 1976), politician who served in the New Jersey General Assembly from 1994 to 1996
- Stephen M. Sweeney (born 1959), politician
- John Taylor (born 1962), wide receiver who played in the NFL for the San Francisco 49ers
- Keith Taylor (born 1964), retired NFL safety
- Ethan Van Sciver (born 1974, class of 1992), comics artist and social media personality
- William Wesley (born 1964), NBA consultant for Creative Artists Agency
- Darrell Wilson (born 1958), American football coach who is the defensive coordinator for the Wagner Seahawks football team
