= Kevin Owens (basketball) =

American basketball player, writer and podcaster

Personal information
- Born: June 9, 1980 (age 46) Cherry Hill, New Jersey
- Listed height: 208 cm (6 ft 10 in)
- Listed weight: 118 kg (264 lb)

Career information
- High school: Camden Catholic (Cherry Hill, New Jersey)
- College: Monmouth (1999–2021)
- NBA draft: 2003: undrafted
- Playing career: 2003–2010
- Position: Center
- Number: 8

Career history
- 2003–2006: Roanoke Dazzle
- 2006–2007: Cairns Taipans
- 2007: Ulsan Mobis Phoebus
- 2008: Wellington Saints
- 2009: Sigal Prishtina
- 2012: BC Kalev/Cramo

Kevin Owens (born June 9, 1980) is an American former professional basketball player, author and podcaster.

In 2009 Owens played with Sigal Prishtina of the Kosovo Super League. Prior to that Owens played for the Wellington Saints in Wellington, New Zealand and the Ulsan Mobis Phoebus in Ulsan, South Korea of the Korean Basketball League. In the 2006–2007 season Owens played for the Cairns Taipans in Cairns, Australia. Before playing in Australia, Owens played three seasons with the Roanoke Dazzle in the NBA Development League, a minor league system for the National Basketball Association.

Born in Haddonfield, New Jersey, Owens attended Camden Catholic High School in Cherry Hill, New Jersey. He played Division I college basketball at Monmouth University.

At the tail end of his career and immediately after, Owens was a basketball writer/contributor for a number of publications including SLAM Online and SB Nation.

In August 2021, Owens published a collection of stories about his overseas basketball experiences titled Overseas Famous, forwarded by former NBA star and Owens' former coach Chucky Brown, with advanced praise by Lang Whitaker.
