= William Wesley =

American basketball executive

New York Knicks
- Position: Executive Vice President – Senior Basketball Advisor

Personal information
- Born: August 14, 1964 (age 62) Camden, New Jersey, U.S.

Career highlights
- As executive: NBA champion (2026); NBA Cup champion (2025)

William Sydney "World Wide Wes" Wesley (born August 14, 1964) is an American sports executive who serves as the Executive Vice President – Senior Basketball Advisor for the New York Knicks. He is a former consultant for Creative Artists Agency. He is noted for his relationships with numerous high-profile NBA players and team owners, college basketball head coaches and agents. Considered a power broker and one of the most influential figures in the business side of basketball, he forged strong ties before being associated with any business entity.

Wesley has been associated with many of the league's most prominent players, including Richard Hamilton and Allen Iverson. Wesley is a longtime client of Iverson and LeBron James's agent, the Philadelphia attorney Leon Rose, who with him joined the New York Knicks' front office in 2020.

== Early years ==
Wesley was born in Camden, New Jersey. He played high school basketball for Pennsauken High School in Pennsauken Township, New Jersey. Playing for rival Camden High School was Milt Wagner, who later went on to the University of Louisville and the NBA. Wagner claims that Wesley became his friend and confidant during high school, and that he introduced Wesley to Michael Jordan, among other pro basketball luminaries.

Around the same time, Leon Rose played basketball for nearby Cherry Hill High School East in Cherry Hill, New Jersey. In 2005 Rose acknowledged having been Wesley's attorney "for 21 years."

In the early 1980s, Wesley worked as a salesperson at Pro Shoes Inc., an elite sneaker company, specializing in high-end basketball shoes, across the street from the Cherry Hill Mall.

== Involvement with current players and coaches ==
Wesley is involved with The Family, a Detroit-area youth basketball team supported by former Detroit Pistons guard Richard Hamilton, and counts among his closest friends Hamilton, Iverson, and Dajuan Wagner, the son of Milt Wagner and a first-round pick in the 2002 NBA draft. All are clients of Rose.

Wesley was also very visible in the months leading up to LeBron James' defection from agent Aaron Goodwin. Goodwin, who signed James out of high school, had helped him earn a lucrative contract with Nike. James signed with Rose during the summer of 2005.

While head coach at Memphis John Calipari stated, "Wes is a goodwill ambassador to our program.” After Kentucky claimed the title over Kansas, Kentucky Wildcats star Anthony Davis and Michael Kidd-Gilchrist climbed into the stands and shared a celebratory hug with Wesley, who was sitting in the Kentucky family section inside the Superdome.

On May 20, 2010 on Mike and Mike in the Morning, Jalen Rose told Mike and Mike that he coined Wesley's nickname "World Wide Wes".

On June 24, 2020 the New York Knicks announced they had hired Wesley as their new Executive Vice President.

== Personal life ==
Wesley has one daughter, Wynn.

== In popular culture ==
One of hip hop's biggest contemporary artists, Drake, referenced Wesley on his popular 2015 diss track "Back to Back", stating "I learned the game from William Wesley, you could never check me". Wesley was also referenced in Jay-Z's verse in the 2013 song "Pound Cake / Paris Morton Music 2". Shaquille O'Neal references Wesley in his 2017 song "LaVar Ball Diss Track".
