= John Taylor (American football) =

American football player (born 1962)

No. 82
- Positions: Wide receiver, return specialist

Personal information
- Born: March 31, 1962 (age 64); Pennsauken, New Jersey, U.S.
- Listed height: 6 ft 1 in (1.85 m)
- Listed weight: 185 lb (84 kg)

Career information
- High school: Pennsauken
- College: Delaware State
- NFL draft: 1986: 3rd round, 76th overall pick

Career history
- San Francisco 49ers (1987–1995)

Awards and highlights
- 3× Super Bowl champion (XXIII, XXIV, XXIX); Second-team All-Pro (1989); 2× Pro Bowl (1988, 1989); NFL 1980s All-Decade Team; Delaware Sports Hall of Fame; San Francisco 49ers Hall of Fame

Career NFL statistics
- Receptions: 347
- Receiving yards: 5,598
- Receiving touchdowns: 43
- Return touchdowns: 2
- Punt return yards: 1,517
- Kick return yards: 276
- Stats at Pro Football Reference

John Gregory Taylor (born March 31, 1962) is an American former professional football player who was a wide receiver and kick returner with the San Francisco 49ers of the National Football League (NFL). He attended Pennsauken High School and was one of six NFL players to come from PHS during the 1980s. Taylor attended Delaware State College and was a member of their football team, the Hornets. He was a member of the 49ers teams that won Super Bowls XXIII, XXIV, and XXIX. His younger brother is former safety Keith Taylor.

== College career ==
Taylor unsuccessfully attempted to walk-on at Johnson C. Smith University in Charlotte, North Carolina. He transferred to Delaware State the following year and was able to make the team. Taylor totaled 42 touchdowns (33 receiving) over the course of his career at Delaware State, including 15 (13 receiving) his senior season (in only 10 games—they only played 10 games/season during that time period), both conference records. He caught 10 touchdown passes in both his sophomore and junior seasons. He is tied with kicker David Parkinson for most career points (254) in the conference. His 223 receiving yards in one game is also a conference record, and he has the two longest receptions in conference history, 97 and 93 yards. His 24.3 yards/catch average was the NCAA record until Jerome Mathis eclipsed it recently with 26.4. One player has since slightly eclipsed his record in career receiving yardage (Albert Horsey with 2,491 to Taylor's 2,426), but he remains the most dominant and famous player to ever come out of the Mid-Eastern Athletic Conference (MEAC). He was named MEAC Offensive Player of the Year in 1985 and All-MEAC first-team in 1984 and 1985.

== Professional career ==
Taylor was selected by the San Francisco 49ers in the third round of the 1986 NFL draft with the 76th overall pick. This was ranked by ESPN as the 25th Greatest NFL Draft Steal of all time. Taylor played for the 49ers from 1987 to 1995 and was an exceptional counterpart to Hall of Fame teammate Jerry Rice during that time. He led the National Football League in punt return yards (556) in 1988, and he may be best known for catching the winning 10-yard touchdown pass from Joe Montana during the final seconds of Super Bowl XXIII in 1989. He also set Super Bowl records in the game for the most punt return yards (56) and highest punt return average (18.7 yards per return). Taylor also held the record for the longest punt return in Super Bowl history, with a 45-yard return in Super Bowl XXIII, until Denver Broncos' return specialist Jordan Norwood broke that record with a 61-yard return in Super Bowl 50.

By the conclusion of the 1988 season, which ended with his famous touchdown catch in the Super Bowl, Taylor had caught just 23 passes in his two years with the 49ers and was mainly used as punt and kick returner. But in the season after his Super Bowl-winning touchdown reception, Taylor established himself as one of the top receivers in the NFL. Despite not being the #1 receiver on his team, Taylor finished the 1989 season with 60 receptions for 1,077 yards and ten touchdowns (the fourth most touchdown receptions by a player in the NFL that year). In December 1989, on nationally televised Monday Night Football against the Los Angeles Rams, Taylor scored touchdowns on two receptions of over 90 yards (92 and 96), an NFL first. He also set a record for most receiving yards in back-to-back games with a total of 448, a record he held until November 2006 when Chad Johnson of the Cincinnati Bengals broke it with 450 receiving yards. He reached the 1,000 receiving yard milestone again in the 1991 season with 64 receptions for 1,011 yards and nine touchdowns (ranking him seventh in the NFL). In his nine NFL seasons, Taylor recorded 347 receptions for 5,589 yards (an average of 16.1 yards per catch) and 43 touchdowns. He also gained 1,517 yards and two touchdowns returning punts, and added another 276 yards returning kickoffs. He was selected to play in the NFL Pro Bowl twice, in 1988 and 1989. He also won three Super Bowl rings in his career with the 49ers, in 1988, 1989, and 1994. His combined total of 94 punt return yards in those three games are the most by any player in Super Bowl history, and his average of 15.7 yards per return is also the highest.

== Life after football ==
At one time, Taylor owned a trucking company but still drives a truck and leads a quiet life off the field. His only moments in any sort of spotlight come when he's participating in celebrity golf events such as ones sponsored by his Alma mater Delaware State. In 2005, he was inducted into the Delaware Sports Museum and Hall of Fame. He also worked in San Jose juvenile detention as a staff member in unit B-4.

== Hall of Fame nomination ==
Taylor was a nominee for the Pro Football Hall of Fame in 2018, but did not make it to the list of finalists.

== NFL career statistics ==
Legend
	Super Bowl champion
	Led the league
**Bold**	Career high

=== Regular season ===
Year	Team	Games		Receiving				
Year	Team	GP	GS	Rec	Yds	Avg	Lng	TD
1987	SF	12	2	9	151	16.8	34	0
1988	SF	12	3	14	325	**23.2**	73	2
1989	SF	15	15	60	**1,077**	18.0	95	**10**
1990	SF	14	14	49	748	15.3	78	7
1991	SF	**16**	**16**	**64**	1,011	15.8	**97**	9
1992	SF	9	8	25	428	17.1	54	3
1993	SF	**16**	**16**	56	940	16.8	76	5
1994	SF	15	15	41	531	13.0	35	5
1995	SF	12	12	29	387	13.3	40	2
Career		121	101	347	5,598	16.1	97	43
