= Pennsauken Public Schools =

School district in Camden County, New Jersey, US

Address
- 1695 Hylton Road Pennsauken Township, Camden County, New Jersey, 08110; United States
- Coordinates: 39.983177°N 75.028535°W

District information
- Grades: PreK to 12
- Superintendent: James Bevere
- Business administrator: John Ogunkanmi
- Schools: 10

Students and staff
- Enrollment: 4,828 (as of 2022–23)
- Faculty: 415.5 FTEs
- Student–teacher ratio: 11.6:1

Other information
- District Factor Group: CD
- Website: www.pennsauken.net
Ind.	Per pupil	District spending	Rank (*)	K-12 average	%± vs. average
1A	Total Spending	$18,644	55	$18,891	−1.3%
1	Budgetary Cost	14,178	46	14,783	−4.1%
2	Classroom Instruction	8,565	46	8,763	−2.3%
6	Support Services	1,790	19	2,392	−25.2%
8	Administrative Cost	1,459	55	1,485	−1.8%
10	Operations & Maintenance	2,019	84	1,783	13.2%
13	Extracurricular Activities	224	43	268	−16.4%
16	Median Teacher Salary	75,154	89	64,043
Data from NJDoE 2014 Taxpayers' Guide to Education Spending. *Of K-12 districts with more than 3,500 students. Lowest spending=1; Highest=103

The Pennsauken Public Schools is a comprehensive community public school district serving students in pre-kindergarten through twelfth grade from Pennsauken Township, in Camden County, in the U.S. state of New Jersey.

As of the 2022–23 school year, the district, comprised of 10 schools, had an enrollment of 4,828 students and 415.5 classroom teachers (on an FTE basis), for a student–teacher ratio of 11.6:1.

== History ==
Constructed at a planned cost of $3.5 million (equivalent to $40.1 million in 2025) the school opened in September 1959 with students in ninth and tenth grades. Prior to the completion of the high school, Pennsauken students had been sent to schools outside the township at Merchantville High School.

Students from Merchantville had attended the high school as part of a sending/receiving relationship that began in 1972, when the borough's high school was closed. For years, the Merchantville district had sought to end the relationship with the Pennsauken district. In the wake of a 2015 decision by the New Jersey Department of Education, Merchantville students began attending Haddon Heights High School starting in the 2015–16 school year, as part of a transition that was fully in place in the 2018–19 school year.

In the 2021-22 school year, Burling Elementary School (K-5) began its transition into Roosevelt STEM School. By 2023, Roosevelt was a K-6 school, expanding to K-8 in the 2024-25 school year.

The district had been classified by the New Jersey Department of Education as being in District Factor Group "CD", the sixth-highest of eight groupings. District Factor Groups organize districts statewide to allow comparison by common socioeconomic characteristics of the local districts. From lowest socioeconomic status to highest, the categories are A, B, CD, DE, FG, GH, I and J.

== Governance ==
In 1996 the district stated that a parent survey on school uniforms showed 68% of respondents favoring them.

== Schools ==
Schools in the district (with 2022–23 enrollment data from the National Center for Education Statistics) are:

Preschool

- Baldwin Early Childhood Learning Center (with 139 students in PreK)
  - Danielle McGowan, principal

Elementary schools

- G. H. Carson Elementary School (359; K–3)
  - Diane D. Joyce, principal
- Delair Elementary School (269; K–3)
  - Rosalyn Lawrence, principal
- George B. Fine Elementary School (285; PreK–3)
  - Thomas Honeyman, principal
- Benjamin Franklin Elementary School (373; PreK–3)
  - Susan P. Galloza, principal
- Pennsauken Intermediate School (645; 4–5)
  - Tanya Harmon, principal
- Roosevelt STEM School (K-8)
  - Chad Deitch, principal

Middle school

- Howard M. Phifer Middle School (1,010; 6–8)
  - Jon Reising, principal

High schools

- Pennsauken High School (1,558; 9–12)
  - Richard Bonkowski, principal
- Alfred E. Burling Alternative High School (Note: After numerous years as an elementary school, Burling was reorganized as a high school for two consecutive years. The original building re-opened as an elementary school for the 2021-2022 school year.) (35; 6–12)
  - Michael McCoach, principal

== Administration ==
Core members of the district's administration are:

- Caroline Steer, acting superintendent
- John Ogunkanmi, business administrator and board secretary

== Board of education ==
The district's board of education, comprised of nine members, sets policy and oversees the fiscal and educational operation of the district through its administration. As a Type II school district, the board's trustees are elected directly by voters to serve three-year terms of office on a staggered basis, with three seats up for election each year held (since 2012) as part of the November general election. The board appoints a superintendent to oversee the district's day-to-day operations and a business administrator to supervise the business functions of the district.
