= Matthew Boxer =

American politician

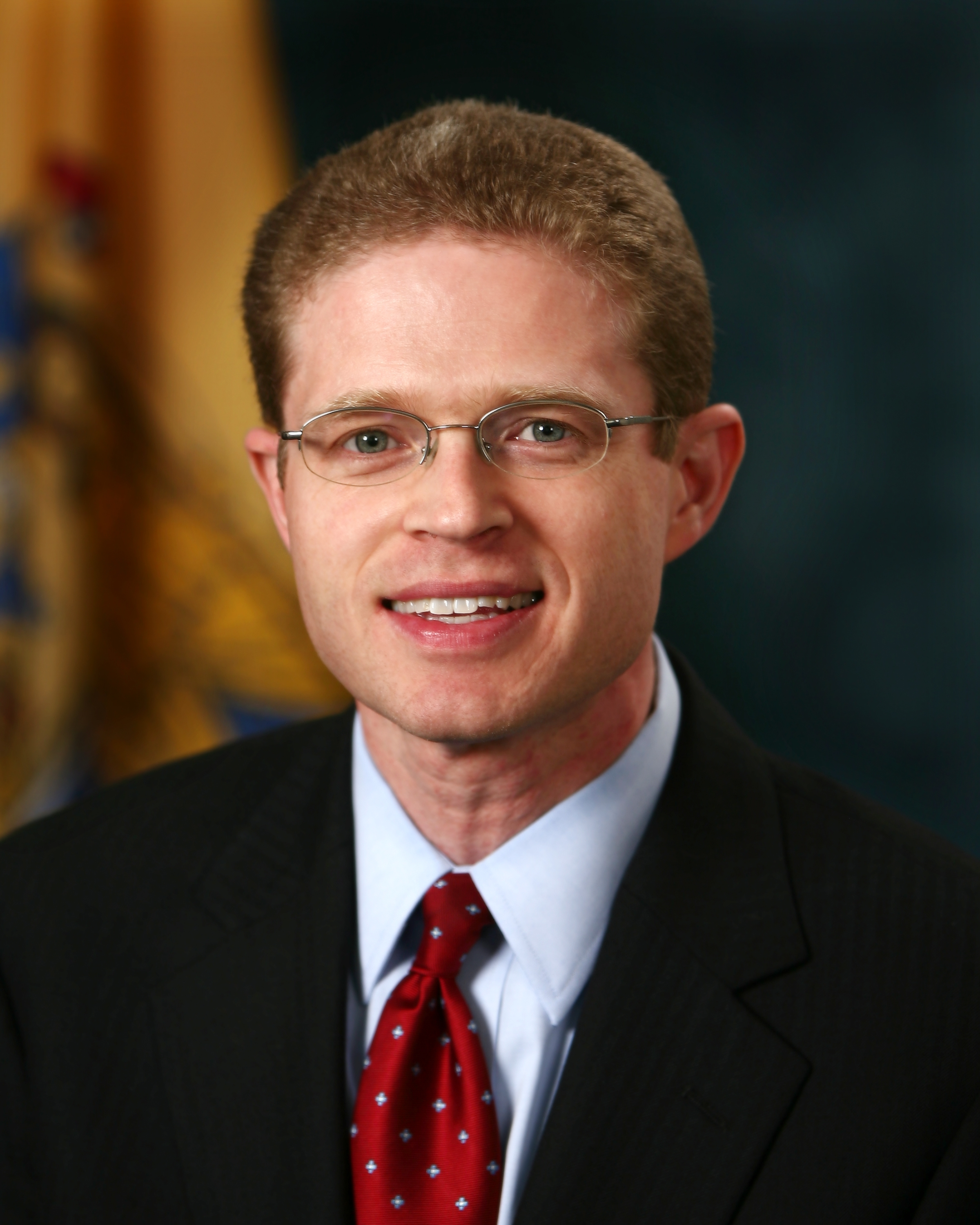
- Official portrait, 2008

1st Comptroller of New Jersey
- In office January 17, 2008 – December 31, 2013
- Governor: Jon Corzine; Chris Christie
- Preceded by: Position established
- Succeeded by: Marc Larkins (acting)

Personal details
- Education: Princeton University (AB); Columbia University (JD)

Matthew Boxer (born October 1970) is an American attorney who served as New Jersey State Comptroller. He was sworn in as New Jersey's first independent state comptroller on January 17, 2008 after the recreation of the office in 2007. He served in this position until the end of his term in December 2013.

Boxer led a staff responsible for overseeing audits and performance reviews at all levels of New Jersey government. The office audits government finances, examines the efficiency of government programs and scrutinizes government contracts. "The mission of the office is clear,"' Boxer said after his swearing-in. '"The Comptroller's Office exists to bring greater efficiency and transparency to the operation of all levels of New Jersey's government: from our town halls and schools, to our state agencies and our independent state authorities. Simply put, this state cannot afford to have its governmental entities wasting money that comes from the hard work of the taxpayers of this state."

== Biography ==
Boxer graduated from Lakewood High School in 1988 and graduated magna cum laude from Princeton University in 1992 with an A.B. in politics after completing a 132-page long senior thesis titled "White Lie, White Power: The Myth of Harmonious Race Relations in Lakewood, New Jersey." He then earned a J.D. from Columbia University School of Law in 1995. Boxer began his career as a law clerk for New Jersey Supreme Court Justice Gary S. Stein and then for U.S. District Court Judge Jerome B. Simandle. He went on to spend four years as an attorney with the Lowenstein Sandler law firm, where he litigated criminal and complex civil cases with an emphasis on securities fraud.

As a federal prosecutor from 2001 to 2006, Boxer served in the terrorism unit, the criminal division and the special prosecutions division of the U.S. Attorney's Office. While there, he oversaw the investigation and prosecution of numerous public officials on corruption charges including Operation Bid Rig.

In January 2006, Gov. Jon Corzine chose Boxer to direct the state Authorities Unit, where he developed new regulations concerning procurement reform and ethics reform that led to greater transparency and efficiency at New Jersey's 58 independent state authorities. He was reappointed by Chris Christie.

After completing his term as State Comptroller, Boxer joined the firm Lowenstein Sandler in Roseland, NJ as a partner and chairman of its corporate investigations and integrity practice.

He is a resident of Bridgewater Township.
