= Super Bowl XXIII =

1989 Edition of the Super Bowl

| Cincinnati Bengals (1) (AFC) (12–4) | San Francisco 49ers (2) (NFC) (10–6) |
|---|---|
| 16 | 20 |
| Head coach: Sam Wyche | Head coach: Bill Walsh |
| | 1 | 2 | 3 | 4 | Total |
|---|---|---|---|---|---|
| CIN | 0 | 3 | 10 | 3 | 16 |
| SF | 3 | 0 | 3 | 14 | 20 |
- Date: January 22, 1989
- Kickoff time: 5:18 p.m. EST (UTC-5)
- Stadium: Joe Robbie Stadium; Miami, Florida
- MVP: Jerry Rice, wide receiver
- Favorite: 49ers by 7
- Referee: Jerry Seeman
- Attendance: 75,129

Ceremonies
- National anthem: Billy Joel
- Coin toss: Nick Buoniconti, Bob Griese, and Larry Little
- Halftime show: "Be Bop Bamboozled" – South Florida-area dancers and performers including Elvis Presto, and 3D effects

TV in the United States
- Network: NBC
- Announcers: Dick Enberg and Merlin Olsen
- Nielsen ratings: 43.5 (est. 81.6 million viewers)
- Market share: 68
- Cost of 30-second commercial: $675,000

Radio in the United States
- Network: CBS Radio
- Announcers: Jack Buck and Hank Stram

Super Bowl XXIII was an American football game between the American Football Conference (AFC) champion Cincinnati Bengals and the National Football Conference (NFC) champion San Francisco 49ers to decide the National Football League (NFL) champion for the 1988 season. The 49ers defeated the Bengals 20–16, winning their third Super Bowl. The game was played on January 22, 1989, at Joe Robbie Stadium in Miami (now part of the suburb of Miami Gardens, which became a separate city in 2003). This was the first Super Bowl hosted in the Miami area in 10 years, and the first in Miami not held at the Orange Bowl.

This was the second meeting between these two teams in the Super Bowl; their first meeting was seven years earlier. The game was also the third rematch between Super Bowl teams after Super Bowl XIII and Super Bowl XVII. This was the Bengals' second Super Bowl appearance after finishing the regular season with a 12–4 record. The 49ers were making their third Super Bowl appearance after posting a 10–6 regular season record.

The game is best remembered for the 49ers' fourth-quarter game-winning drive. Down 16–13, San Francisco got the ball on their own 8-yard line with 3:10 on the clock and marched 92 yards down the field in under three minutes. They then scored the winning touchdown on a Joe Montana pass to John Taylor with just 34 seconds left in the game. The game was tight throughout. The teams combined for five field goals, and battled to a 3–3 score by the end of the second quarter, the first halftime tie in Super Bowl history. Cincinnati's only touchdown, a 93-yard kickoff return by Stanford Jennings in the third quarter, was quickly answered by a four-play, 85-yard drive that ended with San Francisco wide receiver Jerry Rice's 14-yard touchdown reception. The touchdown came one play after Cincinnati cornerback Lewis Billups dropped what would have been a drive-ending interception in the end zone. Rice, who was named the Super Bowl MVP, caught 11 passes for a Super Bowl record 215 yards and a touchdown, while also rushing once for five yards.

== Background ==
=== Host selection process ===
NFL owners voted to award Super Bowl XXIII to Miami, Florida on March 14, 1985, during their March 10–15, 1985 meetings held in Phoenix. This was the sixth time that Miami hosted the game, and the first at Joe Robbie Stadium; the 5 previous Super Bowls in the area were played at the Miami Orange Bowl.

Originally, the selection was to be voted on during the May 23–25, 1984 meetings. However, after balloting for XXI took more than two hours, voting for XXIII was rescheduled. Twelve cities were part of the bidding process, which was scheduled to award two Super Bowls (XXIII and XXIV). The bidding cities included: Anaheim, Detroit, Houston, Jacksonville, Miami, Minneapolis, New Orleans, Philadelphia, San Francisco, Seattle, Tampa, and Tempe. Miami entered as the favorite.

This was the last Super Bowl played on the second to last Sunday in January. From 1990 to 2001, the game was played on the last Sunday of January, and from 2002 to 2021, on the first Sunday in February (with the exception of Super Bowl XXXVII, which was played on January 26, 2003). This was also the last east coast Super Bowl that began under daylight.

=== San Francisco 49ers ===
For the 49ers, it was their first Super Bowl appearance since they defeated the Miami Dolphins in Super Bowl XIX. They had made the playoffs in the three seasons between Super Bowl XIX and Super Bowl XXIII, but were eliminated each time in the first round, primarily because of the poor performances by their offensive stars in those games; quarterback Joe Montana, receiver Jerry Rice, and running back Roger Craig all failed to produce a single touchdown. The previous season's 36–24 playoff loss to the Minnesota Vikings had been a particularly low point for Montana, who had played so poorly that head coach Bill Walsh had benched him early in the third quarter.

In the 1988 season, San Francisco won the NFC West with a 10–6 regular season record and earned the #2 playoff seed, but it was a long uphill battle. Two other teams in their division, the Los Angeles Rams and New Orleans Saints had also recorded 10–6 records, meaning not only did they earn a first-round bye with the narrowest possible margin, but a one more loss would have caused them to miss the playoffs altogether. The team had a quarterback controversy with Montana and Steve Young each starting during the season. Young had started three games during the year, in which the 49ers went 2–1, including a crucial 24–21 week 9 win over the Vikings in which Young scored the game winning touchdown on a dynamic 49-yard run with time running out in the 4th quarter. But after a 6–5 start, Montana led the 49ers to win four of their final five regular season games.

Montana finished the regular season with 238 completions for 2,981 yards and 18 touchdowns, and also added 132 rushing yards. His favorite target was Rice, who recorded 64 receptions for 1,306 yards (a 20.4 yards per catch average) and 9 touchdowns. Craig was also a key contributor, leading the team in receptions (76) while finishing the season with a total of 2,036 combined rushing and receiving yards and 10 touchdowns, earning him the NFL Offensive Player of the Year Award. Fullback Tom Rathman also made a big impact, rushing for 427 yards and catching 42 passes for 387 yards. San Francisco also had a major special teams threat in second-year receiver John Taylor, who led the NFL in punt return yards (556), yards per return, (12.6), and touchdowns (2). He also gained 228 yards on kickoff returns and 325 receiving yards on just 14 receptions (a 23.2 yards per catch average).

The 49ers' defense was led by defensive backs Ronnie Lott, Eric Wright, Jeff Fuller, and Tim McKyer, who recorded a combined total of 18 interceptions. McKyer led the team with 7, while Lott recorded 5, along with 3 forced fumbles and 4 fumble recoveries. Linebacker Charles Haley was also a big contributor with 11.5 sacks and 2 fumble recoveries. The 49ers also had a solid defensive line, featuring Michael Carter (6.5 sacks), Danny Stubbs (6 sacks), Larry Roberts (6 sacks), and Pierce Holt (5 sacks).

=== Cincinnati Bengals ===
The Bengals were also a team on the rebound. During the strike-shortened 1987 season, quarterback Boomer Esiason and head coach Sam Wyche had openly feuded, and the team finished with a miserable 4–11 record, including 0–3 in games played by replacement players. The coach and quarterback worked out their differences in the offseason, and Esiason ended up having the best season of his career en route to Super Bowl XXIII. During the regular season, he threw for 3,572 yards and 28 touchdowns with only 14 interceptions, while also rushing for 248 yards and a touchdown on 43 carries. Esiason's performance made him the top-rated quarterback in the league with a 97.4 passer rating and earned him the NFL Most Valuable Player Award.

Cincinnati had a number of offensive weapons, boasting six Pro Bowl selections. Wide receiver Eddie Brown was the top receiver on the team, with 54 receptions for 1,273 yards and 9 touchdowns, setting franchise records for most receiving yards in season, highest yards per catch average in a season (24.0) and most receiving yards in a single game (216 against the Pittsburgh Steelers). Wide receiver Tim McGee and Pro Bowl tight end Rodney Holman were also major threats, combining for 75 receptions, 1,213 yards, and 9 touchdowns. Rookie fullback Ickey Woods was their top rusher with 1,066 yards and 15 touchdowns, while also catching 21 passes for 199 yards and gaining a lot of media attention with his "Ickey Shuffle", a dance routine he did in the end zone to celebrate his touchdowns. Multi-talented running back James Brooks was also a key contributor, gaining a total of 1,218 combined rushing and receiving yards and 14 touchdowns. And the Bengals' offensive line was led by such Pro Bowl players as right guard Max Montoya and left tackle Anthony Muñoz. Muñoz was named the NFL Offensive Lineman of the Year for the third time in his career, and was selected to play in the Pro Bowl for the 8th season in a row. With all these weapons, Cincinnati's offense led the NFL in scoring (448 points), rushing yards (2,710), and total yards (6,302).

The Bengals' defense ranked 17th in the league, allowing 5,556 yards and 329 points during the regular season. Cincinnati had a superb defensive line, led by Pro Bowl defensive tackle Tim Krumrie (3 sacks and 3 fumble recoveries), along with linemen Jim Skow (9.5 sacks), David Grant (5 sacks), and Jason Buck (6 sacks). Their linebacking corps was led by 13-year veteran Reggie Williams, one of six players remaining from their 1981 Super Bowl team. Pro Bowl defensive backs Eric Thomas and David Fulcher combined for 12 interceptions, while safety Lewis Billups added 4 interceptions and 2 fumble recoveries. The team ended up winning the AFC Central with a 12–4 record.

=== Playoffs ===
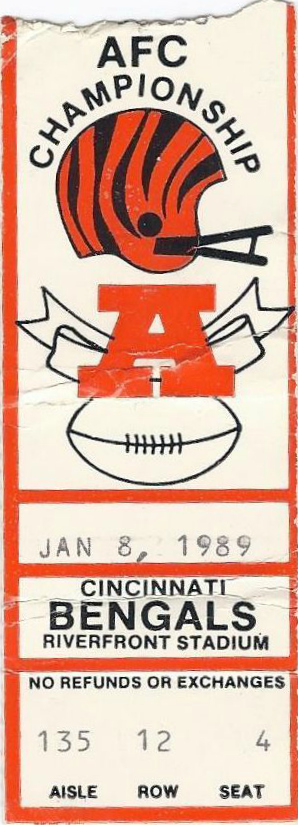
The Bengals defeated the Bills in the AFC Championship Game.

The Bengals went on to defeat the Seattle Seahawks in the AFC Divisional playoff game 21–13, and the Buffalo Bills in the AFC Championship Game 21–10. Woods was the key contributor in both wins, rushing for a combined total of 228 yards and 3 touchdowns. Cincinnati's 17th-ranked defense during the season made a major improvement in the playoffs, holding both their opponents to a combined total of 23 points and recording 5 interceptions.

Meanwhile, Bill Walsh guided the 49ers to crushing playoff wins over the Minnesota Vikings, 34–9 and the Chicago Bears, 28–3. With the win over the Bears, the 49ers became the first road team to win an NFC Championship Game since the 1979 season.

== Super Bowl pregame news ==
Despite the Bengals' superior regular season record and Esiason's MVP award, the 49ers were heavily favored to win the Super Bowl, mainly because of Montana. Montana had already led the 49ers to two previous Super Bowls and both times left with a championship ring and Super Bowl MVP honors. Esiason was also suffering from a sore left (throwing) shoulder, although the Bengals tried to keep it under wraps and made up for a lack of big-play passing attack with a run-heavy offense led by Woods and Brooks against their first two playoff opponents, Seattle and Buffalo.

While Montana had his ups and downs during the regular season, he appeared to be playing his best in the postseason, throwing for 466 yards and 5 touchdowns in his two playoff games, with only 1 interception. In contrast, the sore-shouldered Esiason had thrown for only 202 yards and 1 touchdown, with 2 interceptions, in the Bengals' two playoff victories.

While in Miami, Cincinnati suffered a major blow even before the game began. On the night before the Super Bowl, Stanley Wilson, the Bengals' best fullback and their third-leading rusher during the season with 398 yards, was caught using cocaine in his hotel room. The Bengals had no choice but to leave him off the roster. It was Wilson's third violation of the league's drug policy, and as a result he was banned from the league for life.

Both coaches had a long history with each other. In 1979, 49ers coach Bill Walsh had talked Sam Wyche out of retirement to come and join the team as an assistant coach. Wyche remained on Walsh's coaching staff until 1982, winning a Super Bowl ring against the Bengals in Super Bowl XVI.

The rematch was the third time in Super Bowl history two teams were meeting for a second time. Miami and Washington met in Super Bowls VII and XVII, with the teams splitting the games. Dallas and Pittsburgh met in Super Bowls X and XIII, with Pittsburgh winning both of those games. Both Dallas-Pittsburgh matchups were in Miami at the Orange Bowl. Pittsburgh and Dallas would later meet in Super Bowl XXX (which the Cowboys won by 10) to become the first two teams to ever meet three times in the Super Bowl. The Cowboys and Bills (Super Bowls XXVII and XXVIII), Rams and Patriots (Super Bowls XXXVI and LIII), Eagles and Patriots (Super Bowls XXXIX and LII), Giants and Patriots (Super Bowls XLII and XLVI), 49ers and Chiefs (Super Bowls LIV and LVIII) and Eagles and Chiefs (Super Bowls LVII and LIX) have also met in two Super Bowls each.

The 49ers, as the designated home team in the annual rotation between AFC and NFC teams, wore their home red uniforms with gold pants. The Bengals, on the other hand, wore their all-white road uniforms.

=== Overtown rioting ===
On January 16, a Hispanic Miami police officer shot and killed a speeding black motorcyclist in the Overtown section of Miami. A large crowd gathered and turned violent, leading to rioting and looting which lasted into January 18. A television van and several automobiles and buildings were set on fire, and police used tear gas against the rioters. A teenager was shot and killed in the melee and more than $1 million worth of damage was done.

Rumors began that the Super Bowl might be moved to Tampa, and the incident later prompted the NFL to look at the league's hiring of minorities and its lack of black coaches at the time (the following season Art Shell became the first African-American NFL head coach of the modern era with the Los Angeles Raiders).

== Broadcasting ==
The game was broadcast in the United States by NBC with Dick Enberg handling the play-by-play duties and color commentator Merlin Olsen in the broadcast booth. This would be Olsen's final Super Bowl broadcast, as he was demoted the following season to make room for retiring 49ers head coach Bill Walsh. Bob Costas and Gayle Gardner hosted the Super Bowl Live! pregame (2 hours), halftime, and postgame coverage with analysts Paul Maguire and then-Miami Dolphins head coach Don Shula. Also assisting with NBC's coverage were pregame roving reporter Jim Gray (who was also working as a researcher for NBC Sports at the time), Al Roker, who did a brief weather report at the beginning of the pregame show (Roker was already in Miami due to NBC News having sent him there as part of the Sunday Today coverage) and Marv Albert, who interviewed Sam Wyche and Boomer Esiason after the game. Meanwhile, during NBC's pregame coverage, Ahmad Rashad and John Candy hosted the Diet Pepsi Talent Challenge at the Miami Seaquarium. Also, Frank Deford narrated a special segment profiling recently deceased Pittsburgh Steelers owner Art Rooney.

This was also the first NFL game that NBC covered with their new "Quantel Cypher" graphics system, which was introduced during their coverage of the 1988 Seoul Olympics (they had used Chyron for their graphics prior to Super Bowl XXIII; the Cypher was also used for the network's presentation of the 1988 World Series). NBC also introduced their "cursive font" logo during this broadcast. Before, it was just the 1986 peacock logo with "NBC SPORTS" in their generic corporate font.

With the win, the 49ers became the first team to win Super Bowls televised on three different networks (CBS–XVI, ABC–XIX, and NBC). Since then, the Washington Redskins (in Super Bowl XXVI), the Green Bay Packers (in Super Bowl XXXI), the Pittsburgh Steelers (in Super Bowl XL), the New York Giants (in Super Bowl XLII), and the New England Patriots (in Super Bowl XLIX) have accomplished this same feat.

At the end of NBC's telecast, they played Rod Stewart's "Forever Young" against highlights of the past few months of sporting events to air on the network: The Summer Olympics from Seoul, the World Series between the Los Angeles Dodgers and Oakland Athletics, the Fiesta Bowl between the Notre Dame Fighting Irish and West Virginia Mountaineers, and finally Super Bowl XXIII. During the closing credits, NBC used the instrumental tune "Everglade Run" by Yanni.

This game also marked the debut of the USA Today Super Bowl Ad Meter. The first winner of the annual survey was an ad from American Express starring Saturday Night Live stars Dana Carvey and Jon Lovitz, who went to the game with different credit cards – Carvey with American Express, Lovitz with AmEx rival Visa.

The game aired on Channel 4 in the United Kingdom and was simulcast on CTV in Canada and Televisa's Canal de las Estrellas in Mexico. For viewers watching the game on AFN TV Europe (Armed Forces Network), AFN and NBC broke for a commercial just before the Montana-Taylor touchdown play. AFN continued their announcements and did not get back to the game until after the touchdown. AFN viewers saw the winning touchdown in replay.

On radio, the game was broadcast in the United States by CBS with Jack Buck handling the play-by-play duties and color commentator Hank Stram in the broadcast booth. Brent Musburger hosted the pregame, halftime, and postgame coverage with analysts Dick Butkus, Irv Cross and Will McDonough, all from CBS' The NFL Today. Locally, Super Bowl XXIII was broadcast by WKRC-AM in Cincinnati with Phil Samp and former Bengals Ken Anderson and Dave Lapham, and by KGO-AM in San Francisco with Lon Simmons (calling his final game as 49ers play-by-play announcer), Wayne Walker and Joe Starkey (who filled in for Simmons in 1987 and '88 for games which conflicted with the San Francisco Giants before taking over play-by-play full-time in 1989).

== Entertainment ==
The pregame festivities honored the Miami and South Florida areas, along with a tribute to NASA.

Singer Billy Joel later sang the national anthem. He also sang the national anthem at Super Bowl XLI, which coincidentally was held at the same venue. The anthem concluded with a flyover by F-16 Fighting Falcons from the 31st Tactical Fighter Wing at Homestead Air Force Base.

The coin toss ceremony featured former Miami Dolphins players Nick Buoniconti, Bob Griese, and Larry Little.

This was the last outdoor Super Bowl to start earlier than 6 p.m. Eastern Standard Time, as it started just after 5 p.m.

=== Halftime show ===
The halftime show was titled "Be Bop Bamboozled in 3-D" and featured an Elvis impersonator, played by then-Solid Gold dancer Alex Cole, and hundreds of South Florida-area dancers and performers. Two portions of Elvis Presley songs were performed ("Blue Suede Shoes" and "Burning Love"), and the rest of the show instead featured songs from musicals among other tunes. Several scenes included computer-generated 3D images. Prior to the game, Coca-Cola distributed 3D glasses at retailers for viewers to use. At the onset of the halftime show, primary sponsor Diet Coke aired the first commercial in 3D. Coca-Cola had originally planned to use the 3D Diet Coke commercial as part of the Moonlighting season finale, which was also aired in 3D, but withdrew plans due to the 1988 Writers Guild of America Strike.

== Game summary ==
=== First quarter ===
Super Bowl XXIII started out with devastating injuries on both sides. On the third play of the game, 49ers tackle Steve Wallace was taken off the field with a broken ankle and replaced by Bubba Paris. On the 14th play of the game, Bengals defensive lineman Tim Krumrie twisted his ankle nearly 180 degrees, shattering two bones in his left leg. Krumrie was replaced by rookie David Grant.

After the two teams traded punts on their first drives of the game, the 49ers, aided by a roughing the passer penalty and a 17-yard screen pass to fullback Tom Rathman on 3rd-and-10, marched 73 yards from their own 3-yard line to the Bengals 24. But dropped passes, including one by receiver Mike Wilson on the 2-yard line (the first time in a Super Bowl that instant replay was used to reverse a call), forced them to settle for a 41-yard field goal from kicker Mike Cofer.

On the 49ers' next drive, Montana threw a pass to wide receiver Jerry Rice, who first tipped it to himself and then made a one-handed catch before stepping out of bounds at the San Francisco 45-yard line.

=== Second quarter ===
Then after reaching the Cincinnati 42-yard line, Montana spotted defensive back Lewis Billups trying to cover Rice one-on-one and made him pay for it by completing a pass to the receiver at the 10. But two plays later on a third-down play, Bengals safety David Fulcher made a touchdown saving tackle at the 2 to keep Rathman from scoring. Cofer then attempted a 19-yard field goal, but a poor snap from center Randy Cross, in his final game, (though NBC's Dick Enberg initially blamed backup guard Chuck Thomas; who lined up next to Cross and split long-snapping duties; primarily on punts) threw off the kicker's timing and his kick sailed wide left. Cofer succeeded Rich Karlis, who missed a 21-yard field goal in Super Bowl XXI, as the kicker with the shortest missed field goal in Super Bowl history, a record that still holds.

The 49ers then forced the Bengals to punt on their next drive. On the play, San Francisco Pro Bowl punt returner John Taylor misplayed punter Lee Johnson's kick, and it sailed over his head, bouncing all the way to the 49ers 9 to make it a then-Super Bowl record 63-yard punt. But Taylor made up for his mistake by chasing the ball down and returning it for a then-Super Bowl record 45 yards to the Bengals 46. Thanks to Taylor, a seemingly routine punt had turned into a double record setter. Taylor's Super Bowl record for longest punt return stood for 27 seasons until Super Bowl 50, when Denver Broncos' return specialist Jordan Norwood had a 61-yard return. Johnson's Super Bowl record for longest punt stood for 30 seasons until Super Bowl LIII, when Los Angeles Rams' punter Johnny Hekker had a 65-yard punt.

However, the 49ers were unable to take advantage of their excellent starting field position. On first down, running back Harry Sydney fumbled a pitch from Montana and was downed for a 10-yard loss after he dove on the ball. On the next play, Montana was sacked by defensive lineman David Grant (who replaced Krumrie at nose tackle). Then on third down, Fulcher forced a fumble from 49ers running back Roger Craig, and Bengals defensive end Jim Skow recovered the ball on his own 41. Cincinnati then drove to the San Francisco 42, but after two incomplete passes and defensive end Danny Stubbs's eight-yard sack on Bengals quarterback Boomer Esiason, they were forced to punt. However, Johnson pinned the 49ers back at their own 11. Then the Cincinnati defense limited the 49ers to just one yard on their ensuing drive, and ended up with great field position after defensive back Ray Horton returned San Francisco punter Barry Helton's 37-yard punt five yards to the 49ers 44.

On their ensuing drive, the Bengals managed to get into scoring range by driving 28 yards to the San Francisco 16, assisted by an 18-yard completion from Esiason to receiver Tim McGee. But after Esiason's third down pass intended for wide receiver Eddie Brown was overthrown, they were forced to settle for kicker Jim Breech's 34-yard field goal with 1:15 left in the half.

The two teams went into their locker rooms tied 3–3, the first halftime tie in Super Bowl history, and the lowest halftime score since the Pittsburgh Steelers took a 2–0 halftime lead over the Minnesota Vikings in Super Bowl IX.

=== Third quarter ===
On their opening possession in the second half, the Bengals managed to get a sustained drive going, moving the ball 61 yards in 12 plays and taking 9:15 off the clock. Esiason, who completed only 4 of 12 passes for 48 yards in the first half, completed 3 of 4 passes for 54 yards on the drive, including a 20-yard completion to James Brooks and 23-yard and 11-yard completions to Cris Collinsworth (who was playing in his final game), setting up a 43-yard field goal from Breech to give the Bengals their first lead of the game, 6–3. Cincinnati then forced San Francisco to punt, but on the first play of their next drive, 49ers rookie linebacker Bill Romanowski intercepted a pass from Esiason at the Bengals 23. However, after a dropped pass by Rice, the 49ers' offense could not get a first down, and they had to settle for Cofer's 32-yard field goal to tie the game, 6–6.

With less than a minute left in the third quarter, it appeared that this would become the first Super Bowl ever to go three quarters without either team scoring a touchdown. But on the ensuing kickoff, Stanford Jennings received the ball at the 7, ran straight up the middle behind a wedge of blockers, and burst out of the pack into the open field. 49ers receiver Terry Greer managed to chase him down and trip him up at the 1, but he still fell into the end zone for a 93-yard touchdown return, giving the Bengals a 13–6 lead. Jennings joined Fulton Walker as the only other player at that time to return a kickoff for a touchdown in the Super Bowl. In the next three Super Bowls played in what is now Hard Rock Stadium, players duplicated Jennings' feat: Andre Coleman returned a kickoff against the 49ers in Super Bowl XXIX for the San Diego Chargers, Tim Dwight did so for the Atlanta Falcons against the Denver Broncos in Super Bowl XXXIII, and Devin Hester did so for the Chicago Bears against the Indianapolis Colts in Super Bowl XLI.

But the 49ers immediately responded with a touchdown of their own on an 85-yard, 4-play drive. First, Montana threw a short pass to Rice, who turned it into a 31-yard gain.

=== Fourth quarter ===
Then the San Francisco quarterback completed a 40-yard pass to Craig on the first play of the fourth quarter, moving the ball to the Bengals 14. Montana's next pass was nearly intercepted but dropped by Cincinnati cornerback Lewis Billups in the end zone. On the next play, Montana threw a 14-yard touchdown pass to Rice to tie the game at 13.

Cofer's ensuing kickoff went out of bounds, giving the Bengals the ball at their own 35. But they could only reach their 43 before being forced to punt. Taylor nearly turned the ball over by fumbling Johnson's punt, but teammate Darryl Pollard recovered the ball at the San Francisco 18. On the first play of the ensuing drive, Montana completed a 44-yard pass to Rice, and then Craig ran for seven yards, moving the ball to the Bengals 31. But after Craig was tackled for a one-yard loss on the next play, Fulcher broke up a third-down pass intended for Taylor, and then Cofer's 49-yard field attempt sailed wide right.

The Bengals took over from their own 32 and regained the lead with a 10-play, 46-yard drive, featuring a 17-yard reception by backup receiver Ira Hillary on third and 13, along with 21 yards on three carries from Ickey Woods and a 12-yard play-action sideline pass to James Brooks. At the end of the drive, Breech kicked a 40-yard field goal, giving the Bengals a 16–13 lead with 3:20 left in the game. The 49ers returned the ensuing kickoff to their own 15 with 3:10 on the clock, but an illegal block penalty on the play pushed the ball back half the distance to the goal line to the 8.

Montana then led an 11-play, 92-yard drive to score the winning touchdown. In order to calm his teammates in the huddle just before the final game-winning drive, Montana pointed into the stadium crowd and said, "Hey, isn't that John Candy?" The tactic worked, and the 49ers were able to drive down the field for the win. It became the defining moment of Montana's "Joe Cool" reputation. Assuming that the Bengals would expect him to throw the ball near the sidelines (to enable the receivers to step out of bounds to immediately stop the clock), Montana first threw a pair of completions in the middle of the field, one to Craig and one to tight end John Frank. His next pass went to the right sideline, 7 yards to Rice, which was then followed up by a pair of runs by Craig to reach their own 35-yard line. Montana then completed a 17-yard pass to Rice to advance to the Bengals 48-yard line, and followed it up with a 13-yard completion to Craig to move them to the 35-yard line.

On the next play, Montana threw his first incomplete pass of the drive, overthrowing Rice. After that, Cross committed an illegal man downfield penalty, which at the time was a 10-yard foul, moving the ball back to the 45 and bringing up second down and 20 with just 1:15 left in the game. But on the next play, Montana hit Rice with a 27-yard completion giving the 49ers the ball at the Cincinnati 18. An eight-yard pass to Craig then advanced San Francisco to the 10. Then with 39 seconds left, Montana finished the drive with a 10-yard TD pass to Taylor on a post pattern down the middle of the field, giving the 49ers a 20–16 lead with just 34 seconds remaining.

The Bengals returned the kickoff to the 25-yard line, and began their desperation drive with a five-yard completion to the sideline and a 3-yard sack, forcing them to use a timeout with 17 seconds remaining. On third down and eight from their own 27-yard line, Esiason just missed Collinsworth at the San Francisco 45-yard line, with the pass bouncing off Collinsworth's hands as he neared the sideline. On fourth down with ten seconds remaining, Esiason's desperation heave to a big crowd down the left sideline fell incomplete near the San Francisco 25-yard line as time expired, officially securing the victory for the 49ers.

Although Jerry Rice was named MVP, Montana had an MVP-worthy performance, completing 23 of 36 passes for a Super Bowl record 357 yards, throwing for two touchdowns, and gaining 14 rushing yards. Craig finished with 71 yards rushing, and eight receptions for 101 receiving yards. He was the first running back in Super Bowl history to gain 100 receiving yards. Taylor finished the game with a Super Bowl record 56 punt return yards. His 18.7 yards per return was also the highest average in Super Bowl history. Linebacker Charles Haley had six tackles and two sacks. For Cincinnati, Jennings rushed one time for three yards, and gained 117 yards and a touchdown on two kickoff returns. Woods had a game-high 79 rushing yards. The sore-armed Esiason was limited to completing 11 out of 25 passes for 144 yards and an interception. Collinsworth (who retired after the game) was the Bengals' top receiver of the game, but with just three catches for 40 yards.

The 49ers became the sixth team to win the Super Bowl over a team with a better regular season record. The 49ers also became the first team since the NFL went to a 16-game schedule in 1978 to win the Super Bowl after winning only 10 games during the regular season. Their six regular season losses were tied for the most ever by a Super Bowl champion, until the 9–7 New York Giants won Super Bowl XLVI following the 2011 season. Additionally, the 49ers' 13 combined regular season and postseason wins are tied for the lowest ever for a league champion, also tied with the 2011 New York Giants.

=== Box score ===
Super Bowl XXIII: San Francisco 49ers 20, Cincinnati Bengals 16

| Quarter | 1 | 2 | 3 | 4 | Total |
|---|---|---|---|---|---|
| Bengals (AFC) | 0 | 3 | 10 | 3 | 16 |
| 49ers (NFC) | 3 | 0 | 3 | 14 | 20 |

at Joe Robbie Stadium, Miami, Florida

- Date: January 22, 1989
- Game time: 5:18 p.m. EST
- Game weather: 76 °F (24 °C), cloudy with winds of 25–30 MPH

Scoring summary

| Quarter | Time | Drive | | | Team | Scoring information | Score | |
| Quarter | Time | Plays | Yards | TOP | Team | Scoring information | CIN | SF |
|---|---|---|---|---|---|---|---|---|
| 1 | 3:14 | 13 | 73 | 5:02 | SF | 41-yard field goal by Mike Cofer | 0 | 3 |
| 2 | 1:15 | 6 | 28 | 2:49 | CIN | 34-yard field goal by Jim Breech | 3 | 3 |
| 3 | 5:39 | 13 | 61 | 9:21 | CIN | 43-yard field goal by Breech | 6 | 3 |
| 3 | 0:50 | 4 | 8 | 1:30 | SF | 32-yard field goal by Cofer | 6 | 6 |
| 3 | 0:34 | — | — | — | CIN | Stanford Jennings 93-yard kickoff return for a touchdown, Breech kick good | 13 | 6 |
| 4 | 14:03 | 4 | 85 | 1:31 | SF | Jerry Rice 14-yard touchdown reception from Joe Montana, Cofer kick good | 13 | 13 |
| 4 | 3:20 | 11 | 46 | 5:27 | CIN | 40-yard field goal by Breech | 16 | 13 |
| 4 | 0:34 | 11 | 92 | 2:46 | SF | John Taylor 10-yard touchdown reception from Montana, Cofer kick good | 16 | 20 |
| "TOP" = time of possession. For other American football terms, see Glossary of American football. | | | | | | | 16 | 20 |

== Aftermath ==
This was the final NFL game coached by the 49ers' Bill Walsh, as he retired from NFL coaching. After spending the next three seasons as a broadcaster for NBC, he then coached Stanford from 1992 to 1994. Walsh then returned to the 49ers' front office, first serving as the team's vice president and general manager from 1999 to 2001, and as a consultant from 2002 to 2004.

49ers center Randy Cross and Bengals wide receiver Cris Collinsworth both retired as players after the game and both subsequently became broadcasters (Cross on CBS, while Collinsworth joined HBO on their show Inside The NFL); though between 1994 and 1997, both Cross and Collinsworth would be employed as broadcasters for NBC.

This was also the final Super Bowl that Pete Rozelle presided over as NFL Commissioner. Paul Tagliabue was selected by league owners as Rozelle's successor in 1989, taking over the post midway through the 1989 season.

The Bengals would not appear in another Super Bowl until Super Bowl LVI.

On January 26, 2006, NFL.com ranked this game Number 1 on its list of the top 10 Super Bowls of all time. In 2019, in celebrating the 100th season, the NFL ranked the game as the 19th greatest game in NFL history.

== Final statistics ==
Sources: NFL.com Super Bowl XXIII, Super Bowl XXIII Play Finder SF, Super Bowl XXIII Play Finder Cin, Super Bowl XXIII Play by Play, The Football Database Super Bowl XXIII

=== Statistical comparison ===
| | Cincinnati Bengals | San Francisco 49ers |
|---|---|---|
| First downs | 13 | 23 |
| First downs rushing | 7 | 6 |
| First downs passing | 6 | 16 |
| First downs penalty | 0 | 1 |
| Third down efficiency | 4/13 | 4/13 |
| Fourth down efficiency | 0/1 | 0/0 |
| Net yards rushing | 106 | 111 |
| Rushing attempts | 28 | 28 |
| Yards per rush | 3.8 | 4.0 |
| Passing – Completions/attempts | 11/25 | 23/36 |
| Times sacked-total yards | 5–21 | 3–14 |
| Interceptions thrown | 1 | 0 |
| Net yards passing | 123 | 343 |
| Total net yards | 229 | 454 |
| Punt returns-total yards | 2–5 | 3–56 |
| Kickoff returns-total yards | 3–132 | 5–77 |
| Interceptions-total return yards | 0–0 | 1–0 |
| Punts-average yardage | 5–44.2 | 4–37.0 |
| Fumbles-lost | 1–0 | 4–1 |
| Penalties-total yards | 7–65 | 4–32 |
| Time of possession | 32:43 | 27:17 |
| Turnovers | 1 | 1 |

=== Individual statistics ===
Bengals passing
| | C/ATT^{1} | Yds | TD | INT | Rating |
|---|---|---|---|---|---|
| Boomer Esiason | 11/25 | 144 | 0 | 1 | 46.1 |
Bengals rushing
| | Car^{2} | Yds | TD | LG^{3} | Yds/Car |
| Ickey Woods | 20 | 79 | 0 | 10 | 3.95 |
| James Brooks | 6 | 24 | 0 | 11 | 4.00 |
| Stanford Jennings | 1 | 3 | 0 | 3 | 3.00 |
| Boomer Esiason | 1 | 0 | 0 | 0 | 0.00 |
Bengals receiving
| | Rec^{4} | Yds | TD | LG^{3} | Target^{5} |
| Cris Collinsworth | 3 | 40 | 0 | 23 | 6 |
| Eddie Brown | 3 | 32 | 0 | 17 | 6 |
| James Brooks | 2 | 32 | 0 | 20 | 3 |
| Tim McGee | 2 | 23 | 0 | 18 | 6 |
| Ira Hillary | 1 | 17 | 0 | 17 | 1 |
| Rodney Holman | 0 | 0 | 0 | 0 | 1 |
| Jim Riggs | 0 | 0 | 0 | 0 | 1 |

49ers passing
| | C/ATT^{1} | Yds | TD | INT | Rating |
|---|---|---|---|---|---|
| Joe Montana | 23/36 | 357 | 2 | 0 | 115.2 |
49ers rushing
| | Car^{2} | Yds | TD | LG^{3} | Yds/Car |
| Roger Craig | 17 | 71 | 0 | 13 | 4.18 |
| Tom Rathman | 5 | 23 | 0 | 11 | 4.60 |
| Joe Montana | 4 | 13 | 0 | 11 | 3.25 |
| Jerry Rice | 1 | 5 | 0 | 5 | 5.00 |
49ers receiving
| | Rec^{4} | Yds | TD | LG^{3} | Target^{5} |
| Jerry Rice | 11 | 215 | 1 | 44 | 15 |
| Roger Craig | 8 | 101 | 0 | 40 | 12 |
| John Frank | 2 | 15 | 0 | 8 | 3 |
| Tom Rathman | 1 | 16 | 0 | 16 | 1 |
| John Taylor | 1 | 10 | 1 | 10 | 4 |
| Mike Wilson | 0 | 0 | 0 | 0 | 1 |

^{1}Completions/attempts ^{2}Carries ^{3}Long gain ^{4}Receptions ^{5}Times targeted

=== Records set ===
The following records were set in Super Bowl XXIII, according to the official NFL.com boxscore and the Pro-Football-Reference.com game summary.
Some records have to meet NFL minimum number of attempts to be recognized. The minimums are shown (in parentheses).

Player records set
Passing records
| Highest completion percentage, career, (40 attempts) | 65.6% (61–93) | Joe Montana (San Francisco) |
| Most passing yards, game | 357 | Joe Montana (San Francisco) |
| Most attempts, without interception, game | 36 | Joe Montana (San Francisco) |
Receiving records
| Most yards, game | 215 | Jerry Rice (San Francisco) |
Special Teams
| Longest punt return | 45 yards | John Taylor (San Francisco) |
| Most punt return yards gained, game | 56 yards | John Taylor (San Francisco) |
| Most punt return yards gained, career | 56 yards | John Taylor (San Francisco) |
| Highest average, punt return yardage, game (3 returns) | 18.7 yards (3–56) | John Taylor (San Francisco) |
| Longest punt | 63 yards | Lee Johnson (Cincinnati) |
| Most 40-plus yard field goals, game | 2 | Jim Breech (Cincinnati) |
Records tied
| Most pass completions, career | 61 | Joe Montana (San Francisco) |
| Lowest percentage, passes had intercepted, career, (40 attempts) | 0% (0–93) | Joe Montana (San Francisco) |
| Most pass receptions, game | 11 | Jerry Rice (San Francisco) |
| Most kickoff returns for touchdowns, game | 1 | Stanford Jennings (Cincinnati) |

Team records set
| Most yards passing (net) | 341 yards | 49ers |
| Highest average gain, kickoff returns (3 returns) | 44.0 yards (132–3) | 49ers |
| Most yards gained, punt returns | 56 yards | 49ers |
| Highest average gain, punt returns (3 returns) | 18.7 yds (56–3) | 49ers |
Records tied
| Most points, fourth quarter | 14 points | 49ers |
| Fewest rushing touchdowns | 0 | Bengals; 49ers |
| Fewest passing touchdowns | 0 | Bengals |
| Most kickoff returns for touchdowns | 1 | Bengals |

Records set, both team totals
| | Total | 49ers | Bengals |
|---|---|---|---|
| Most field goals made | 5 | 2 | 3 |
Records tied, both team totals
| Most field goals attempted | 7 | 4 | 3 |
| Fewest rushing touchdowns | 0 | 0 | 0 |
| Fewest times intercepted | 1 | 0 | 1 |
| Fewest interceptions by | 1 | 1 | 0 |

== Starting lineups ==
Hall of Fame ‡

| Cincinnati | Position | Position | San Francisco |
|---|---|---|---|
Offense
| Tim McGee | WR | | John Taylor |
| Anthony Muñoz‡ | LT | | Steve Wallace |
| Bruce Reimers | LG | | Jesse Sapolu |
| Bruce Kozerski | C | | Randy Cross |
| Max Montoya | RG | | Guy McIntyre |
| Brian Blados | RT | | Harris Barton |
| Rodney Holman | TE | | John Frank |
| Eddie Brown | WR | | Jerry Rice‡ |
| Boomer Esiason | QB | | Joe Montana‡ |
| James Brooks | RB | | Roger Craig‡ |
| Ickey Woods | FB | | Tom Rathman |
Defense
| Jim Skow | LE | | Larry Roberts |
| Tim Krumrie | NT | | Michael Carter |
| Jason Buck | RE | | Kevin Fagan |
| Leon White | LOLB | | Charles Haley‡ |
| Carl Zander | LILB | | Jim Fahnhorst |
| Joe Kelly | RILB | | Michael Walter |
| Reggie Williams | ROLB | | Keena Turner |
| Lewis Billups | LCB | | Tim McKyer |
| Eric Thomas | RCB | | Don Griffin |
| David Fulcher | SS | | Jeff Fuller |
| Solomon Wilcots | FS | | Ronnie Lott‡ |

== Officials ==
- Referee: Jerry Seeman #70 first Super Bowl on field; alternate for XIV; officiated Super Bowl XXV two years later before becoming NFL Vice President of Officiating
- Umpire: Gordon Wells #89 second Super Bowl (XVIII)
- Head linesman: Jerry Bergman #17 fourth Super Bowl (XIII, XVI, XVIII)
- Line judge: Bob Beeks #59 fifth Super Bowl (XIV, XVI, XVIII, XXI)
- Back judge: Paul Baetz #22 first Super Bowl
- Side judge: Gary Lane #120 first Super Bowl
- Field judge: Bobby Skelton #73 first Super Bowl
- Alternate referee: Gene Barth #14 referee for Super Bowl XVIII
- Alternate umpire: Ed Fiffick #57 alternate for Super Bowl XIX

Bob Beeks became the third person, and first African-American, to officiate five Super Bowls, joining Tom Kelleher and Jack Fette. He was selected for five Super Bowls in ten seasons from 1979-88.
