= Todd McNair =

American football player and coach (born 1965)

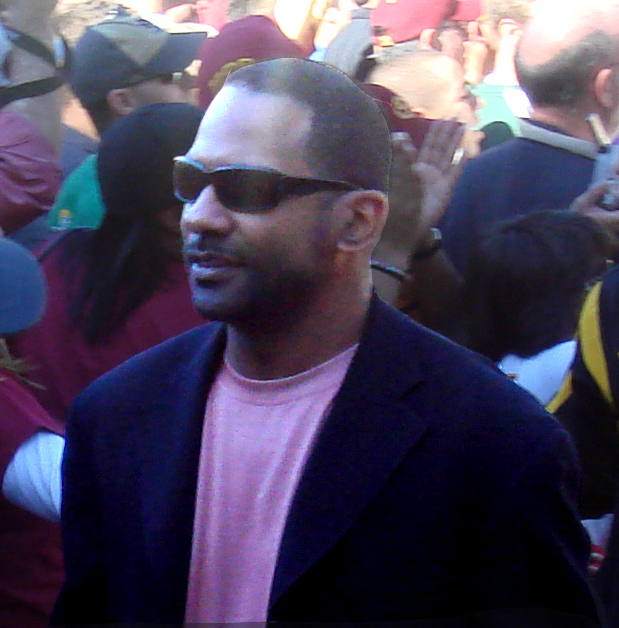
- McNair walking with the USC Trojans to a stadium before a game

Profile
- Position: Running back

Personal information
- Born: August 16, 1965 (age 61); Camden, New Jersey, U.S.
- Listed height: 6 ft 1 in (1.85 m)
- Listed weight: 196 lb (89 kg)

Career information
- High school: Pennsauken (NJ)
- College: Temple
- NFL draft: 1989: 8th round, 220th overall pick

Career history

Playing
- Kansas City Chiefs (1989–1993); Houston Oilers (1994–1995); Kansas City Chiefs (1996)

Coaching
- Cleveland Browns (2001–2003) Running backs coach; USC (2004–2010) Running backs coach; Tampa Bay Buccaneers (2019–2022) Running backs coach

Awards and highlights
- Super Bowl champion (LV); Second-team All-East (1987)

Career NFL statistics
- Rushing yards: 803
- Rushing touchdowns: 3
- Receptions: 254
- Receiving yards: 2,435
- Receiving touchdowns: 7
- Kick return yards: 1,100
- Stats at Pro Football Reference

Todd Darren McNair (born August 16, 1965) is an American football coach and former player who was most recently the running backs coach for the Tampa Bay Buccaneers of the National Football League (NFL). He previously served as the running backs coach at the University of Southern California from 2004 to 2010, until the NCAA issued a one-year show-cause penalty against him as part of sanctions related to the ineligibility of one of his former players, Reggie Bush. McNair had a long-running lawsuit pending against the NCAA for libel, slander, breach of contract and four other alleged offenses. The lawsuit finally was settled through mediation after ten years.

== Early life ==
McNair was born in Camden, New Jersey, to Todd McNair Sr. and Carole Y. McNair. He lived in Pennsauken Township, New Jersey and played high school football at Pennsauken High School. He was a 1988 graduate of Temple University, where he played football.

McNair is the uncle of former Pittsburgh Steelers running back Isaac Redman. Younger brother Scott McNair was also a running back at Temple.

== Professional career ==
McNair was drafted by the Kansas City Chiefs in the eighth round of the 1989 NFL Draft. McNair played professionally in the National Football League (NFL) for the Kansas City Chiefs and the Houston Oilers. During his career he filled a variety of roles, including acting as lead blocker, special teams, and third-down back. By the end of his career, he ran for 803 yards with 3 touchdowns, caught 252 passes with 7 touchdowns and averaged 18.6 yards on kickoff returns, retiring as the Chiefs' 10th all-time receiver.

== NFL career statistics ==
Legend
**Bold**	Career high

=== Regular season ===
Year	Team	Games		Rushing					Receiving				
Year	Team	GP	GS	Att	Yds	Avg	Lng	TD	Rec	Yds	Avg	Lng	TD
1989	KAN	14	0	23	121	5.3	25	0	34	372	10.9	24	1
1990	KAN	15	1	14	61	4.4	13	0	40	**507**	**12.7**	**65**	**2**
1991	KAN	14	0	10	51	5.1	11	0	37	342	9.2	36	1
1992	KAN	**16**	0	21	124	5.9	30	1	44	380	8.6	36	1
1993	KAN	15	1	**51**	**278**	5.5	**47**	**2**	10	74	7.4	24	0
1994	HOU	**16**	1	0	0	0.0	0	0	8	78	9.8	21	0
1995	HOU	15	**7**	19	136	**7.2**	22	0	**60**	501	8.4	25	1
1996	KAN	**16**	0	9	32	3.6	9	0	21	181	8.6	29	1
Total		121	10	147	803	5.5	47	3	254	2,435	9.6	65	7

=== Playoffs ===
Year	Team	Games		Rushing					Receiving				
Year	Team	GP	GS	Att	Yds	Avg	Lng	TD	Rec	Yds	Avg	Lng	TD
1990	KAN	1	0	2	7	3.5	**8**	0	3	22	7.3	13	0
1991	KAN	2	0	1	3	3.0	3	0	**5**	**52**	**10.4**	14	0
1992	KAN	1	**1**	**3**	**18**	**6.0**	6	0	4	35	8.8	13	0
1993	KAN	**3**	0	2	9	4.5	**8**	0	**5**	51	10.2	**31**	0
Total		7	1	8	37	4.6	8	0	17	160	9.4	31	0

== Coaching career ==
McNair retired from professional football in 1996 and began coaching at Camden High School in Camden, New Jersey. McNair was the running backs coach for the Cleveland Browns from 2001 to 2003, and joined USC Trojans from 2004 to 2009. In his first season, he served as Running Backs Coach, and took on the additional position of Special Teams Coordinator in 2005. McNair was considered one of the most effective recruiters in college football. He was named one of the nation's top-25 recruiters by Rivals.com.

McNair's contract at USC expired June 30, 2010 and was not renewed after 6 years. He played a key part in the NCAA's investigation of the school's athletic department dealing with former Trojans running back Reggie Bush.

The 2004 and 2005 USC Trojans football teams have had wins vacated and a BCS National Championship stripped following NCAA rulings that running back Reggie Bush was ineligible due to improper benefits. These sanctions have been criticized by some NCAA football writers, including ESPN's Ted Miller, who wrote, "It's become an accepted fact among informed college football observers that the NCAA sanctions against USC were a travesty of justice, and the NCAA's refusal to revisit that travesty are a massive act of cowardice on the part of the organization." It bears mentioning that Miller wrote this, not in the context of a commentary on the NCAA's legitimacy, but in a lamentation on that season's PAC10 title game matchup.

The NCAA ruled that McNair had engaged in unethical conduct, claiming that McNair had known about some of Bush's improperly received benefits, and sanctioned him with a show-cause penalty, prohibiting his interactions with football recruits for one year. Following a failed appeal of his sanctions, McNair announced an intent to sue the NCAA, accusing the body of libel, slander and misconduct.

On January 20, 2013, it was reported that McNair would be the new running backs coach of the Arizona Cardinals. However, 12 days later, McNair stated that he would not be joining the Cardinals' coaching staff. On January 10, 2019, McNair agreed to terms to become the new running backs coach for the Tampa Bay Buccaneers. McNair earned his first Super Bowl title when the Buccaneers won Super Bowl LV. The Buccaneers fired McNair on January 19, 2023.

== Lawsuit against the NCAA ==
On June 6, 2011, McNair filed suit against the NCAA, alleging that the collegiate athletics governing body wrongfully caused him to lose his job with the Trojans because of punishment handed down in 2010 in the Reggie Bush case. The suit, filed in Los Angeles Superior Court, sought unspecified damages for libel, slander, breach of contract and four other alleged offenses. It also took issue with the one-sided examination policy established by the NCAA, which doesn't allow those targeted by investigations to cross-examine witnesses used.

The disputed issues in McNair's appeal centered on the believability of one of the NCAA's key witnesses in the case, Lloyd Lake, the would-be sports marketer who allegedly provided substantial amounts of money to Bush's family over a two-year period while the star running back played for the Trojans. McNair, the NCAA ruled, either knew or should have known about Bush's relationship with Lake and purposely misled investigators. But McNair said that he did not know about the relationship between Lake and Bush, and that the NCAA itself committed misconduct in the process of its investigation.

In November 2012, Los Angeles Superior Court Judge Frederick Shaller ruled that the NCAA was "malicious" in its investigation of McNair. In his ruling, the Judge stated that e-mails between an investigative committee member, an NCAA worker, and a person who works in the agency's appeals division "tend to show ill will or hatred" toward McNair. In an e-mail, one staffer called McNair "a lying morally bankrupt criminal, in my view, and a hypocrite of the highest order." Judge Shaller said he would unseal the entire inquiry into McNair in December.

On December 3, 2018, McNair petitioned for a new trial, which was granted in January 2019 with the Los Angeles Times noting, "The judge wrote that the infractions committee's report was false "in several material ways."

In July 2021, McNair and the NCAA settled the lawsuit through mediation. Financial terms of the settlement were not disclosed. The USC wins remained vacated, as announced by the NCAA two days later.
