= 3Breezy =

American rapper, singer and songwriter

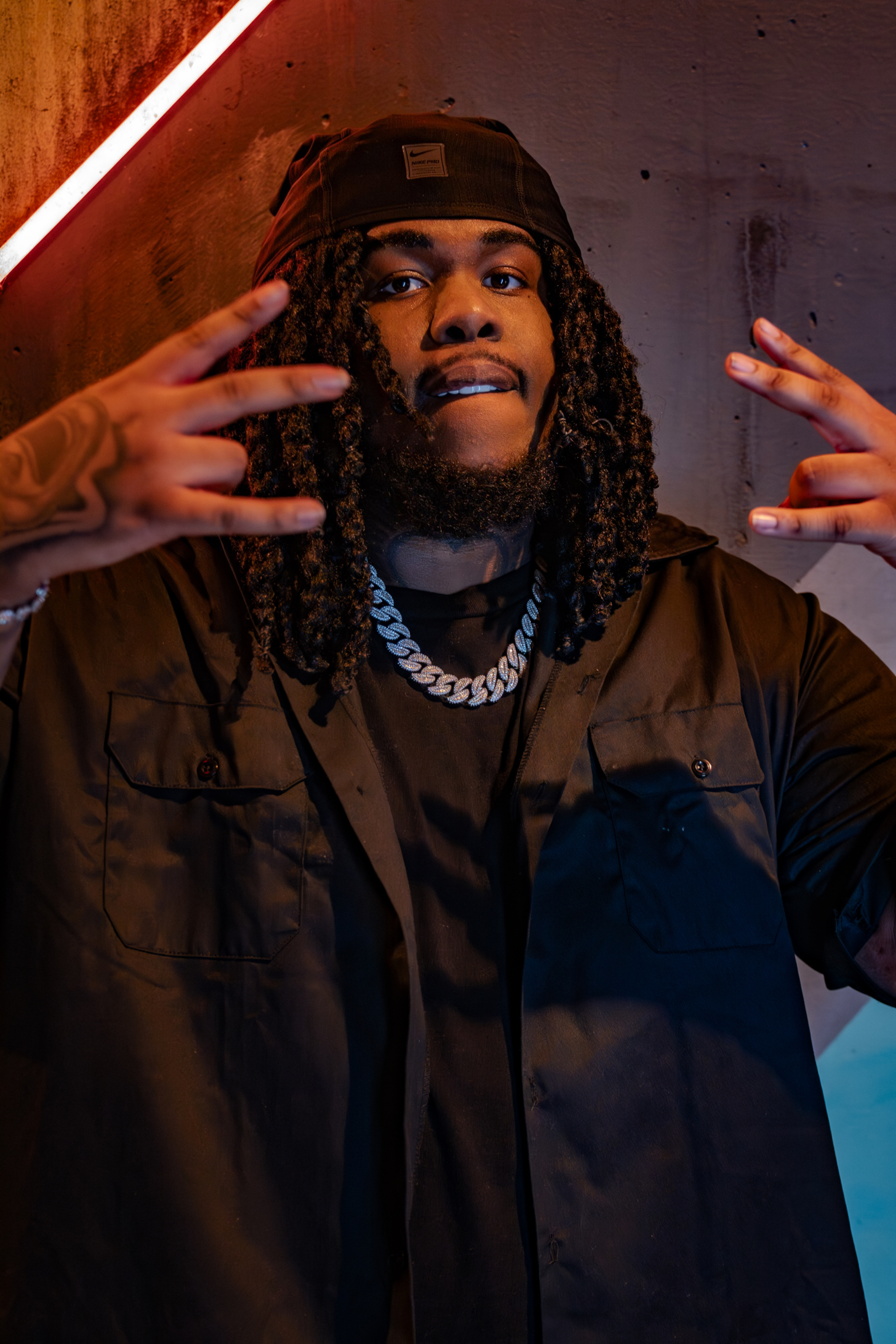

Background information
- Also known as: Big Breeze
- Born: Nihee Joshua Wesley; August 23, 1999 (age 27); Pennsauken Township, New Jersey, U.S.
- Genres: Hip hop; R&B; melodic rap
- Occupation: Rapper
- Years active: 2020–present
- Label: Capitol (former)
- Website: www.3breezy.com

Nihee Joshua Wesley (born August 23, 1999), known professionally as 3Breezy, is an American rapper, singer and songwriter.

Wesley began his music career in 2020 and rose to prominence with singles "Message to Her" and "Gangsta wit It", both of which would garner millions of streams and go viral on TikTok, the former being a lead single for his debut project, Murda She Wrote.

Formerly signed to Capitol Records, Wesley now releases music as an independent artist.

== Early life ==
Nihee Joshua Wesley was born in Pennsauken Township, New Jersey, in a house surrounded by women, and the influence of his sisters and aunts would come to shape themes found in his music later down the line.

Wesley grew up listening to artists like Chris Brown and Ne-Yo, though he originally wanted to pursue being a veterinarian tech, from his experience at a dog daycare in high school and later earning his license at a local community college. He would pick up music during the COVID-19 pandemic lockdowns.

== Career ==
=== 2020–21: Career beginnings, Gangsta Wit It and TikTok success ===
3Breezy released his first song "Soul To Keep" on SoundCloud in 2020. He would continue to independently release music, some of which he would go on to tease on TikTok, which would lead to the release of his biggest song "Gangsta wit It", a song he would release in November. Following the success of "Gangsta Wit It, 3Breezy would finish off the month with his debut mixtape Murda She Wrote, which would contain another one of 3Breezy's most successful songs, "Message to Her", another song that would go viral on TikTok.

Following the success of Murda She Wrote, 3Breezy would be signed to Capitol Records who would re-release the mixtape under the tutelage of the label.

=== 2021–22: Continued success, Catch a Breeze and Heart on Display ===
Throughout 2021, 3Breezy would see more success with singles "Love No More", "Broken Insecurities" and the release of his extended play, titled Message from Breezy, released in February and would continue his roll of singles with "Took Advantage", "Move On" and "Love Hurts". His singles "Self Love" and "Can't FWU" would be released as the lead singles to his major label debut, Catch a Breeze, which was released on November 12 and would feature KB Mike, Sally Sossa and Rocko Ballin.

3Breezy would release the sequel to "Gangsta Wit It", titled "Gangsta wit It Pt. 2" which would feature label-mate Toosii to start off the summer of 2022. The single would serve as a lead single to 3Breezy's second album under Capitol titled Heart on Display, which would also feature lead singles "Sneaky Link", "All Of Me" and "2FarGone", featuring frequent collaborator, Hayward, California native, Yatta Bandz.

Heart on Display, which would be 3Breezy's final album released under Capitol, would be released on November 4, 2022, followed by a six-song deluxe edition a month later in December.

== Artistry ==
3Breezy's music is characterized by his tender lyrics and songwriting that is often catered to women and the idea of self-love and self-empowerment, though he feels men can relate to his messaging too. 3Breezy has also spoken on his wishes to further expand his sound and his messages in his music. Speaking to American Songwriter, Breezy would state "I've been trying to expand my sound," Breezy says. "I've been trying a lot of different beats, different melodies, different topics that I had not touched on previously".

== Discography ==
Studio albums

- Catch a Breeze (2021)
- Heart on Display (2022)
- Message From Breezy 2 (2025)

Mixtapes

- Murda She Wrote (2020)

EPs

- Message from Breezy (2020)
