= Darrell Wilson =

American football player and coach (born 1958)

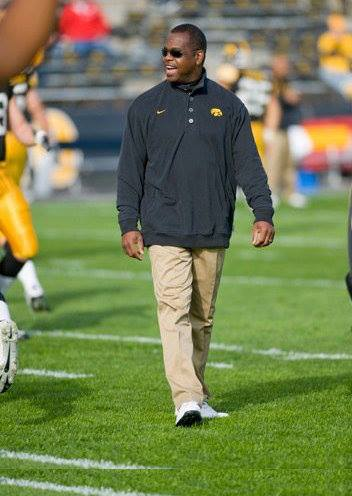
- Wilson with Iowa in 2011

No. 47
- Position: Defensive back

Personal information
- Born: July 28, 1958 (age 68); Camden, New Jersey, U.S.
- Listed height: 5 ft 11 in (1.80 m)
- Listed weight: 180 lb (82 kg)

Career information
- High school: Pennsauken (Pennsauken Township, New Jersey)
- College: Connecticut (1976–1980)
- NFL draft: 1981: undrafted

Career history

Playing
- New England Patriots (1981); Toronto Argonauts (1982–1986)

Coaching
- Woodrow Wilson HS (NJ) (1988–1995) Head coach; Rhode Island (1996–1998) Wide receivers coach & defensive backs coach; Rutgers (1999) Running backs coach; Wisconsin (2000–2001) Special teams coordinator & outside linebackers coach; Iowa (2002–2007) Special teams coordinator & outside linebackers coach; Iowa (2008–2011) Special teams coordinator & linebackers coach; Iowa (2012) Special teams coordinator & defensive backs coach; Rutgers (2013–2015) Defensive backs coach; Wagner (2018–2021) Assistant head coach, special teams coordinator, & defensive pass game coordinator; Wagner (2022) Defensive coordinator & defensive backs coach; Delaware State (2023–2024) Assistant head coach, defensive coordinator, & safeties coach

Awards and highlights
- Grey Cup champion (1983)
- Stats at Pro Football Reference

Darrell Wilson (born July 28, 1958) is an American football coach and former player. He played college football for Connecticut and professionally for the New England Patriots of the National Football League (NFL) and the Toronto Argonauts of the Canadian Football League (CFL) as a defensive back. He was the head football coach for Woodrow Wilson High School from 1988 to 1995.

Wilson also coached for Rhode Island, Rutgers, Wisconsin, Iowa, Wagner, and Delaware State.

== Playing career ==
Born in Camden, New Jersey, Wilson was raised in nearby Pennsauken Township and played prep football at Pennsauken High School.

A former honorable mention Division I-AA All-America defensive back for Connecticut (1976–1980), Wilson was named to the Huskies' 100th-anniversary all-time team in 1998. He played one year with the New England Patriots (1981) and five seasons (1982–1986) with the CFL's Toronto Argonauts. He was a member of the 1983 squad that won the CFL's Grey Cup.

== Coaching career ==
Wilson has spent 16 seasons coaching in the Big Ten (11 at Iowa, two at Wisconsin, three at Rutgers), while having over 20 years of coaching experience.

Before his collegiate coaching career began, Darrell Wilson compiled a 65-18 record as head coach at Woodrow Wilson High School in Camden, N.J. (1988–1995). His teams won five conference championships and four times advanced to the South Jersey Group III state finals. Along with the success of his teams on the football field, Wilson was named Camden's "Citizen of the Year" by the Rotary Club in 1992.

Darrell Wilson's first collegiate coaching position was at Rhode Island (1996–1998), where he coached the secondary and wide receivers. He then coached running backs at Rutgers (1999).

Wilson joined the Iowa staff after serving as outside linebacker coach and special teams coordinator at Wisconsin for two years (2000–01). While at Iowa, Wilson coached special teams and outside linebackers in his first six seasons. He then worked with all the linebacker positions and special teams for the four seasons. In 2012, Wilson took over coaching the secondary while assisting with special teams.

He was named by Rivals.com in February 2011 as one of the top 25 recruiters in the nation, primarily recruiting New Jersey, Maryland and Pennsylvania. Under Wilson's coaching, Iowa ranked among national leaders in interceptions. The Hawkeyes collected 10 interceptions in 2012, returning two of those for touchdowns. Cornerback Micah Hyde was honored with the Tatum-Woodson Defensive Back of the Year award, presented by the Big Ten, while earning First-team All-Big Ten honors. Throughout Wilson's tenure, Iowa won 89 games, with 52 Big Ten victories. While at Iowa, the program participated in 10 bowl games with six taking place in January. The Hawkeyes finished ranked in the final top 10 of both major polls four times in his 11 seasons.

Wilson then coached at Rutgers (2013–2015) as the defensive backs coach. In 2013, Wilson helped develop a unit that saw five freshmen start at cornerback. At Rutgers, Wilson primarily recruited New Jersey, Maryland, and Pennsylvania.
