= Pennsauken Township, New Jersey =

Township in Camden County, New Jersey, US

- Township
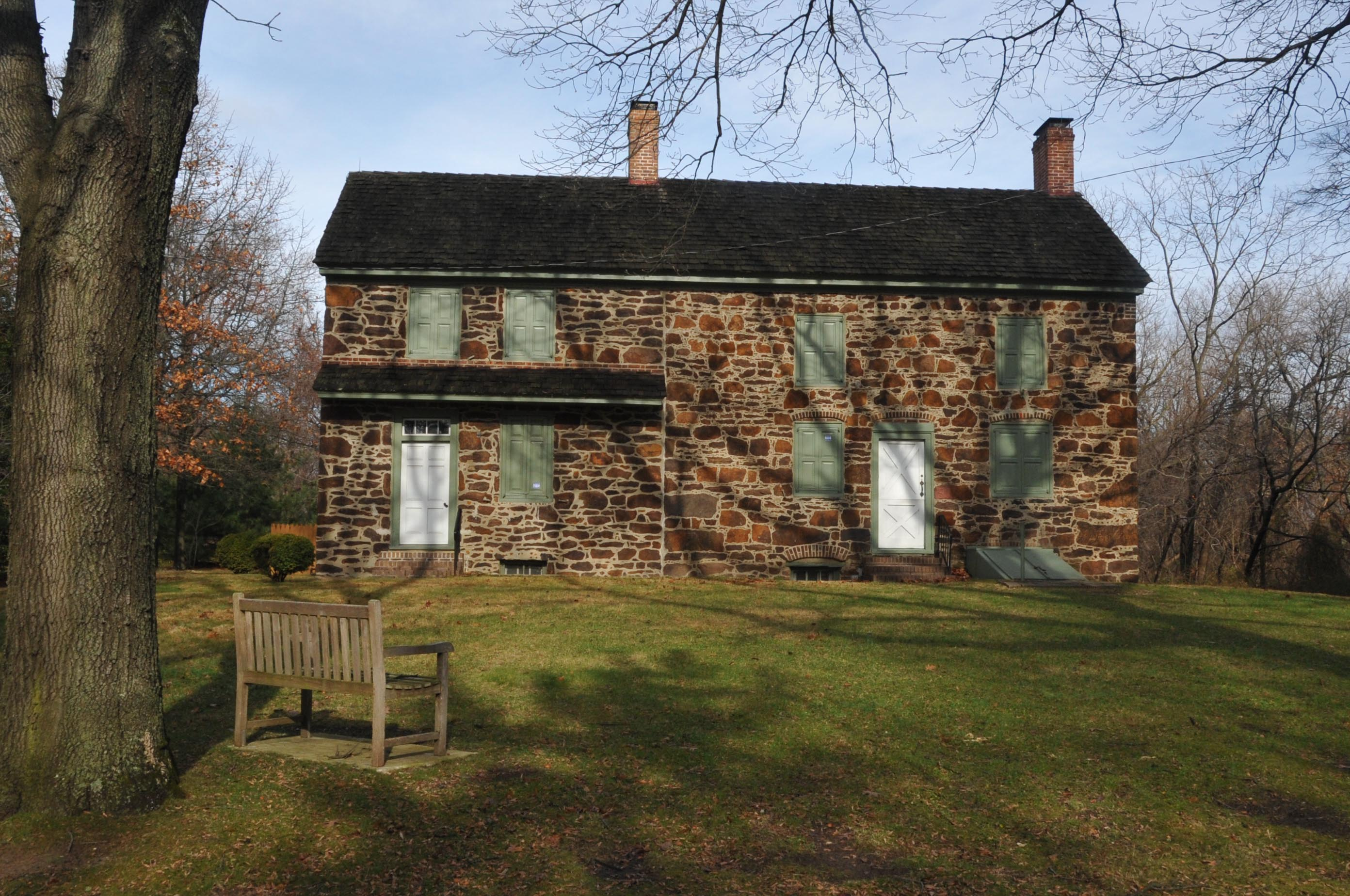
- Burrough-Dover House

- Seal
- Motto: A Great Place to Grow, Dream and Prosper!
- Location of Pennsauken Township in Camden County highlighted in red (right). Inset map: Location of Camden County in New Jersey highlighted in orange (left).

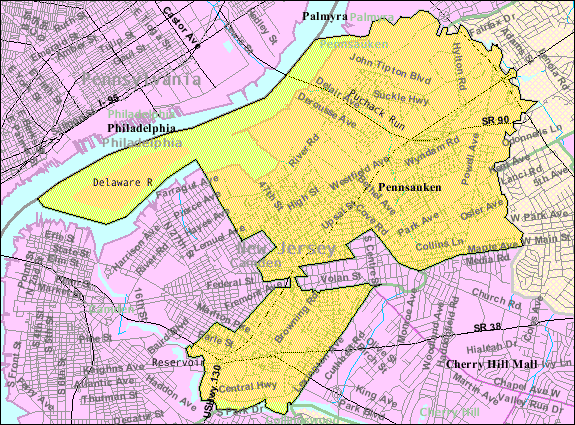
- Census Bureau map of Pennsauken Township, New Jersey Interactive map of Pennsauken, New Jersey

- Location in Camden County Location in New Jersey Location in the United States
- Coordinates: 39.968392°N 75.057942°W
- Country: United States
- State: New Jersey
- County: Camden
- Incorporated: February 18, 1892

Government
  - Type: Township
  - Body: Township Committee
  - Mayor: Nicole Roberts (D, term ends December 31, 2025)
  - Administrator: Tim Killion
  - Municipal clerk: Pamela Scott-Forman

Area
  - Total: 12.13 sq mi (31.41 km^{2})
  - Land: 10.48 sq mi (27.14 km^{2})
  - Water: 1.65 sq mi (4.27 km^{2}) 13.59%
  - Rank: 189th of 565 in state 5th of 37 in county
- Elevation: 89 ft (27 m)

Population (2020)
  - Total: 37,074
  - Estimate (2023): 37,288
  - Rank: 66th of 565 in state 5th of 37 in county
  - Density: 3,537.9/sq mi (1,366.0/km^{2})
  - Rank: 190th of 565 in state 23rd of 37 in county
- Time zone: UTC−05:00 (Eastern (EST))
  - Summer (DST): UTC−04:00 (Eastern (EDT))
- ZIP Codes: 08109–08110
- Area code: 856
- FIPS code: 3400757660
- GNIS feature ID: 0882157
- Website: www.pennsauken.gov

Pennsauken Township is a township in Camden County, in the Philadelphia Metropolitan Area in the U.S. state of New Jersey, and it is located outside of Philadelphia, Pennsylvania, which it borders directly on the Delaware River. As of the 2020 United States census, the township's population was 37,074, an increase of 1,189 (+3.3%) from the 2010 census count of 35,885, which in turn increased by 148 (+0.4%) from the 35,737 counted in the 2000 census.

The township is part of the South Jersey region of the state.

== History ==
Pennsauken Township was incorporated as a township by an act of the New Jersey Legislature on February 18, 1892, from portions of the now-defunct Stockton Township.

The exact origin of the name Pennsauken is unclear, but it probably derives from the language of the Lenni Lenape Native Americans, who once occupied the area from "Pindasenauken", the Lenape language term for tobacco pouch. Alternatively, the "Penn" in the township's name refers to William Penn, while "sauk" is a water inlet or outlet.

Pennsauken was home to America's first drive-in movie theater, created in 1933 with the opening of the Camden Drive-In in Pennsauken. It featured the comedy Wives Beware, released in the theaters as Two White Arms.

For 50 years, the township was the home to the Pennsauken Mart, a large multi-vendor indoor market, which was closed in January 2006 to make way for a sports arena/conference complex, however, that did not materialize. Most of the vendors relocated to a marketplace in Willingboro Township. A luxury apartment complex was completed on the site in 2018.

== Geography ==
According to the U.S. Census Bureau, the township had a total area of 12.13 square miles (31.41 km^{2}), including 10.48 square miles (27.14 km^{2}) of land and 1.65 square miles (4.27 km^{2}) of water (13.59%).

Unincorporated communities, localities and place names located partially or completely within the township include Amon Heights, Bethel, Biedemon, Delair, Delair Station, Delaware Gardens, Dudley, East Pennsauken, Fish House, Hillcrest, Homesteadville, Jordantown, Merchantville Park, Morris, Morrisville, North Pennsville and Wellwood.

The township includes Petty's Island, a 392-acre (1.59 km^{2}) island in the Delaware River although most of the island actually sits across a narrow strait from neighboring Camden. Once an oil storage and distribution facility, the island is now the site of a container cargo shipping operation and nesting bald eagles. Petty's Island is currently in the process of being turned over to the State of New Jersey by Citgo to be transformed to a new state park and nature center .

Pennsauken borders Philadelphia, Pennsylvania. The two municipalities are connected across the Delaware River by the Betsy Ross Bridge which is owned and operated by the Delaware River Port Authority. In New Jersey, Pennsauken borders Camden, Cherry Hill, Collingswood and Merchantville in Camden County, and Cinnaminson Township, Maple Shade Township and Palmyra in Burlington County.

== Climate ==
According to the Köppen Climate Classification system, Pennsauken has a humid subtropical climate, abbreviated "Cfa" on climate maps. The hottest temperature recorded in Pennsauken was 108 °F (42.2 °C) on July 16, 1995, while the coldest temperature recorded was −4 °F (−20.0 °C) on January 19–21, 1994.

Climate data for Pennsauken, New Jersey, 1991–2020 normals, extremes 1991–present
Month	Jan	Feb	Mar	Apr	May	Jun	Jul	Aug	Sep	Oct	Nov	Dec	Year
Record high °F (°C)	74 (23)	77 (25)	94 (34)	96 (36)	100 (38)	100 (38)	108 (42)	103 (39)	98 (37)	92 (33)	80 (27)	77 (25)	108 (42)
Mean maximum °F (°C)	64.0 (17.8)	63.7 (17.6)	74.2 (23.4)	85.7 (29.8)	90.4 (32.4)	94.9 (34.9)	98.5 (36.9)	95.4 (35.2)	90.9 (32.7)	82.1 (27.8)	73.5 (23.1)	65.2 (18.4)	99.4 (37.4)
Mean daily maximum °F (°C)	40.5 (4.7)	43.4 (6.3)	51.7 (10.9)	63.8 (17.7)	73.1 (22.8)	82.1 (27.8)	87.0 (30.6)	84.8 (29.3)	78.1 (25.6)	66.0 (18.9)	55.1 (12.8)	45.5 (7.5)	64.3 (17.9)
Daily mean °F (°C)	31.9 (−0.1)	33.9 (1.1)	41.6 (5.3)	52.2 (11.2)	61.9 (16.6)	71.5 (21.9)	76.7 (24.8)	74.6 (23.7)	67.7 (19.8)	55.4 (13.0)	44.9 (7.2)	36.9 (2.7)	54.1 (12.3)
Mean daily minimum °F (°C)	23.3 (−4.8)	24.5 (−4.2)	31.4 (−0.3)	40.7 (4.8)	50.7 (10.4)	60.9 (16.1)	66.4 (19.1)	64.3 (17.9)	57.2 (14.0)	44.9 (7.2)	34.8 (1.6)	28.4 (−2.0)	44.0 (6.7)
Mean minimum °F (°C)	9.9 (−12.3)	11.7 (−11.3)	18.8 (−7.3)	29.6 (−1.3)	37.9 (3.3)	48.8 (9.3)	58.2 (14.6)	56.2 (13.4)	45.8 (7.7)	33.1 (0.6)	22.8 (−5.1)	16.9 (−8.4)	7.4 (−13.7)
Record low °F (°C)	−4 (−20)	1 (−17)	8 (−13)	24 (−4)	32 (0)	38 (3)	47 (8)	52 (11)	40 (4)	28 (−2)	14 (−10)	6 (−14)	−4 (−20)
Average precipitation inches (mm)	3.46 (88)	2.62 (67)	4.39 (112)	3.94 (100)	3.88 (99)	4.56 (116)	5.04 (128)	4.07 (103)	4.32 (110)	4.07 (103)	3.29 (84)	4.49 (114)	48.13 (1,224)
Average precipitation days (≥ 0.01 in)	10.5	9.3	11.2	12.1	12.6	11.0	10.1	9.9	8.9	9.9	9.3	10.8	125.6
Source 1: NOAA
Source 2: National Weather Service

== Demographics ==
Historical population
Census	Pop.	Note	%±
1900	3,145		—
1910	4,169		32.6%
1920	6,474		55.3%
1930	16,915		161.3%
1940	17,745		4.9%
1950	22,767		28.3%
1960	33,771		48.3%
1970	36,394		7.8%
1980	33,775		−7.2%
1990	34,738		2.9%
2000	35,737		2.9%
2010	35,885		0.4%
2020	37,074		3.3%
2023 (est.)	37,288		0.6%
Population sources: 1900–2000 1900–1920; 1900–1910 1910–1930; 1940–2000 2000; 2010 2020

=== 2010 census ===
The 2010 United States census counted 35,885 people, 12,633 households, and 8,995 families in the township. The population density was 3,438.9 per square mile (1,327.8/km^{2}). There were 13,275 housing units at an average density of 1,272.2 per square mile (491.2/km^{2}). The racial makeup was 47.60% (17,081) White, 26.87% (9,644) Black or African American, 0.59% (210) Native American, 7.72% (2,770) Asian, 0.04% (15) Pacific Islander, 13.59% (4,877) from other races, and 3.59% (1,288) from two or more races. Hispanic or Latino residents of any race were 26.91% (9,657) of the population.

Of the 12,633 households, 30.7% had children under the age of 18; 46.9% were married couples living together; 18.4% had a female householder with no husband present and 28.8% were non-families. Of all households, 23.8% were made up of individuals and 10.1% had someone living alone who was 65 years of age or older. The average household size was 2.83 and the average family size was 3.36.

24.1% of the population were under the age of 18, 9.7% from 18 to 24, 26.0% from 25 to 44, 27.3% from 45 to 64, and 12.9% who were 65 years of age or older. The median age was 38.0 years. For every 100 females, the population had 91.8 males. For every 100 females ages 18 and older there were 87.8 males.

The Census Bureau's 2006–2010 American Community Survey showed that (in 2010 inflation-adjusted dollars) median household income was $57,241 (with a margin of error of +/− $3,957) and the median family income was $65,910 (+/− $3,272). Males had a median income of $47,651 (+/− $3,101) versus $39,229 (+/− $2,035) for females. The per capita income for the borough was $26,048 (+/− $1,438). About 6.4% of families and 8.9% of the population were below the poverty line, including 12.4% of those under age 18 and 6.7% of those age 65 or over.

=== 2000 census ===
As of the 2000 United States census, there were 35,737 people, 12,389 households, and 9,093 families residing in the township. The population density was 3,392.4 inhabitants per square mile (1,309.8/km^{2}). There were 12,945 housing units at an average density of 1,228.8 per square mile (474.4/km^{2}). The racial makeup of the township was 60.10% White, 24.18% African American, 0.35% Native American, 4.58% Asian, 0.02% Pacific Islander, 8.27% from other races, and 2.51% from two or more races. Hispanic or Latino residents of any race were 14.34% of the population.

There were 12,389 households, out of which 36.5% had children under the age of 18 living with them, 51.6% were married couples living together, 16.2% had a female householder with no husband present, and 26.6% were non-families. 23.1% of all households were made up of individuals, and 10.4% had someone living alone who was 65 years of age or older. The average household size was 2.83 and the average family size was 3.34.

In the township, the age distribution of the population shows 27.5% under the age of 18, 7.6% from 18 to 24, 29.7% from 25 to 44, 21.1% from 45 to 64, and 14.2% who were 65 years of age or older. The median age was 36 years. For every 100 females, there were 91.9 males. For every 100 females age 18 and over, there were 86.8 males.

The median income for a household in the township was $47,538, and the median income for a family was $52,760. Males had a median income of $37,652 versus $30,100 for females. The per capita income for the township was $19,004. About 6.1% of families and 8.0% of the population were below the poverty line, including 10.1% of those under age 18 and 8.0% of those age 65 or over.

== Economy ==
Pennsauken is home to a large industrial park that includes a Pepsi bottling plant and J & J Snack Foods.

== Government ==
=== Local government ===
Pennsauken Township is governed under the Township form of New Jersey municipal government, one of 141 municipalities (of the 564) statewide that use this form, the second-most commonly used form of government in the state. The Township Committee is comprised of five members, who are elected directly by the voters at-large in partisan elections to serve three-year terms of office on a staggered basis, with either one or two seats coming up for election each year as part of the November general election in a three-year cycle. At an annual reorganization meeting, the Township Committee selects one of its members to serve as Mayor and another as Deputy Mayor, each serving a one-year term.

As of 2023, members of the Pennsauken Township Committee are Mayor Vince Martinez (D, term of office on committee ends December 31, 2023), Deputy Mayor Patrick Olivo (D, term on committee and as deputy mayor ends 2023; elected to an unexpired term), Marco DiBattista (D, 2024), Jessica Jarbou-Rafeh (R, 2024) and Marie McKenna (D, 2025; appointed to serve an unexpired term).

In January 2023, Marie McKenna was appointed to fill the seat expiring in December 2025 that had been held by Nicole "Nikki" Roberts who had been elected to a full three-year term in the November 2022 general election and resigned from office as of December 2022.

During the 2022 reorganization meeting of Pennsauken Township Committee, Jessica Rafeh was sworn in as the town’s first Hispanic and Middle Eastern mayor; Nicole Roberts became the town’s first African American female deputy mayor; and the pair represent the first time Pennsauken will have an all-female led governing body

In December 2021, the Township Committee selected Nicole Roberts from a list of three candidates submitted by the Democratic municipal committee to fill the seat expiring in December 2021 that was vacated by Almar Dyer when he took office on the Camden County Board of County Commissioners.

In June 2021, Patrick Olivo was appointed to fill the seat expiring in December 2023 that had been held by Tim Killion until he stepped down from office to become the township's administrator.

=== Federal, state and county representation ===
Pennsauken Township is located in the 1st Congressional District and is part of New Jersey's 5th state legislative district.

For the 119th United States Congress, New Jersey's 1st congressional district is represented by Donald Norcross (D, Camden). New Jersey is represented in the United States Senate by Democrats Cory Booker (Newark, term ends 2027) and Andy Kim (Moorestown, term ends 2031).

For the 2026–2027 session, the 5th legislative district of the New Jersey Legislature is represented in the State Senate by Nilsa Cruz-Perez (D, Barrington) and in the General Assembly by Bill Moen (D, Camden) and William Spearman (D, Camden).

Camden County is governed by a Board of County Commissioners composed of seven members chosen at-large in partisan elections for three-year terms on a staggered basis by the residents of the county, with either two or three seats up for election each year as part of the November general election. At a reorganization meeting held in January after each election, the newly constituted Board of Commissioners selects one member to serve as Director and another as Deputy Director, each serving a one-year term in that role. As of 2025, Camden County's Commissioners are: Commissioner Director Louis Cappelli Jr. (D, Collingswood, 2026), Commissioner Deputy Director Edward T. McDonnell (D, Pennsauken Township, 2025), Virginia Ruiz Betteridge (D, Runnemede, 2025), Almar Dyer (D, Pennsauken Township, 2027), Melinda Kane (D, Cherry Hill, 2027), Jeffrey L. Nash (D, Winslow Township, 2027), and Jonathan L. Young Sr. (D, Berlin Township, 2026).

Camden County's constitutional officers are: Clerk Pamela Rosen Lampitt (D, Cherry Hill, 2029) Sheriff Chuck Billingham (D, Gloucester City, 2027) and Surrogate Michelle Gentek-Mayer (D, Gloucester Township, 2025).

=== Politics ===
As of March 2011, there were a total of 22,704 registered voters in Pennsauken Township, of which 9,989 (44.0%) were registered as Democrats, 2,263 (10.0%) were registered as Republicans and 10,443 (46.0%) were registered as Unaffiliated. There were 9 voters registered as Libertarians or Greens.

Gubernatorial election results for Pennsauken Township
Year	Republican		Democratic		Third party(ies)	
Year	No.	%	No.	%	No.	%
2025	2,603	22.46%	8,925	77.01%	62	0.53%
2021	2,353	27.70%	6,100	71.80%	43	0.51%
2017	1,654	22.02%	5,710	76.00%	149	1.98%
2013	3,358	43.50%	4,236	54.87%	126	1.63%
2009	2,517	28.78%	5,594	63.97%	634	7.25%
2005	2,273	28.10%	5,482	67.78%	333	4.12%

In the 2012 presidential election, Democrat Barack Obama received 78.4% of the vote (12,200 cast), ahead of Republican Mitt Romney with 20.8% (3,233 votes), and other candidates with 0.9% (135 votes), among the 15,722 ballots cast by the township's 24,313 registered voters (154 ballots were spoiled), for a turnout of 64.7%. In the 2008 presidential election, Democrat Barack Obama received 74.0% of the vote (12,195 cast), ahead of Republican John McCain, who received around 23.2% (3,824 votes), with 16,485 ballots cast among the township's 21,669 registered voters, for a turnout of 76.1%. In the 2004 presidential election, Democrat John Kerry received 63.7% of the vote (9,384 ballots cast), outpolling Republican George W. Bush, who received around 32.1% (4,720 votes), with 14,726 ballots cast among the township's 20,846 registered voters, for a turnout percentage of 70.6.

United States presidential election results for Pennsauken Township
Year	Republican		Democratic		Third party(ies)	
Year	No.	%	No.	%	No.	%
2024	4,767	30.50%	10,682	68.33%	183	1.17%
2020	4,294	25.23%	12,562	73.80%	165	0.97%
2016	3,250	21.65%	11,390	75.89%	369	2.46%
2012	3,233	20.77%	12,200	78.37%	135	0.87%
2008	3,824	23.20%	12,195	73.98%	466	2.83%
2004	4,720	32.05%	9,384	63.72%	622	4.22%

In the 2009 gubernatorial election, Democrat Jon Corzine received 64.% of the vote (5,594 ballots cast), ahead of both Republican Chris Christie with 28.8% (2,517 votes) and Independent Chris Daggett with 4.2% (364 votes), with 8,745 ballots cast among the township's 22,497 registered voters, yielding a 38.9% turnout.

United States Senate election results for Pennsauken Township1
Year	Republican		Democratic		Third party(ies)	
Year	No.	%	No.	%	No.	%
2024	4,056	27.20%	10,613	71.18%	241	1.62%
2018	2,696	23.09%	8,250	70.67%	728	6.24%
2012	2,936	19.80%	11,745	79.19%	150	1.01%
2006	2,485	28.74%	5,973	69.08%	188	2.17%

United States Senate election results for Pennsauken Township2
Year	Republican		Democratic		Third party(ies)	
Year	No.	%	No.	%	No.	%
2020	4,039	24.03%	12,605	74.99%	164	0.98%
2014	1,751	23.21%	5,692	75.45%	101	1.34%
2013	1,227	24.19%	3,790	74.72%	55	1.08%
2008	3,493	23.54%	11,173	75.29%	173	1.17%

== Education ==
The Pennsauken Public Schools serve public school students in pre-kindergarten through twelfth grade. As of the 2022–23 school year, the district, comprised of 10 schools, had an enrollment of 4,828 students and 415.5 classroom teachers (on an FTE basis), for a student–teacher ratio of 11.6:1. Schools in the district (with 2022–23 enrollment data from the National Center for Education Statistics) are Baldwin Early Childhood Learning Center (with 139 students in PreK), G. H. Carson Elementary School (359; K–3), Delair Elementary School (269; K–3), George B. Fine Elementary School (285; PreK–3), Benjamin Franklin Elementary School (373; PreK–3), Pennsauken Intermediate School (645; 4–5), Howard M. Phifer Middle School (1,010; 6–8), Pennsauken High School (1,558; 9–12) and Alfred E. Burling Alternative High School (35; 6–12).

Also available in the township is the Pennsauken Technical High School, which offers day and evening technical and vocational education to students from across the county.

Eustace Preparatory School is a coeducational, private high school for students in grades 9–12, founded in 1954 by the priests and brothers of the Society of the Catholic Apostolate (the Pallottines). Established in 1927, St. Cecilia School is a K–8 elementary school that operates under the auspices of the Roman Catholic Diocese of Camden. St. Cecilia operates jointly with a group of schools in Camden in the Catholic Partnership Schools, a post-parochial model of Urban Catholic Education.

== Transportation ==
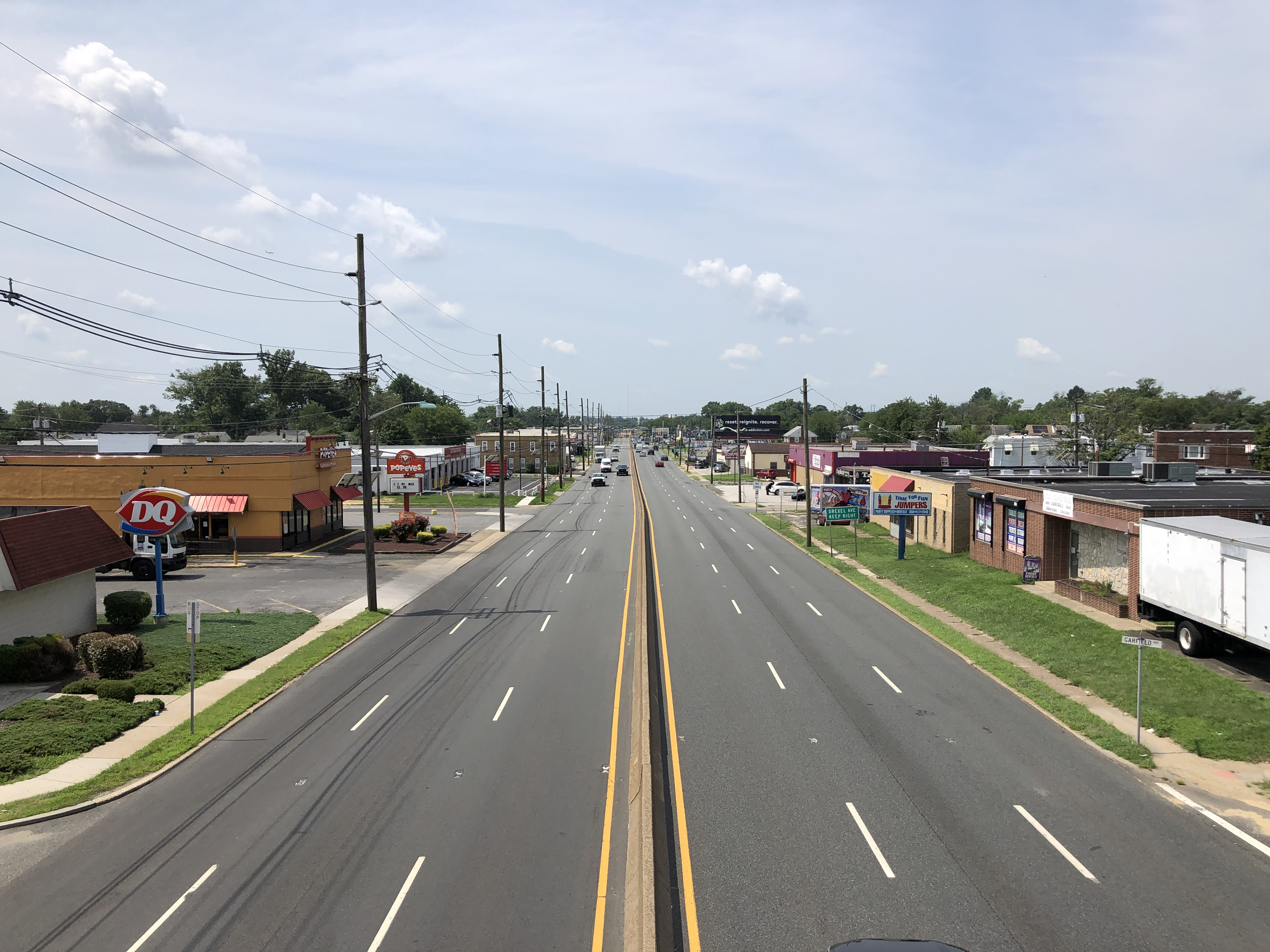
Southbound Route 130 in Pennsauken

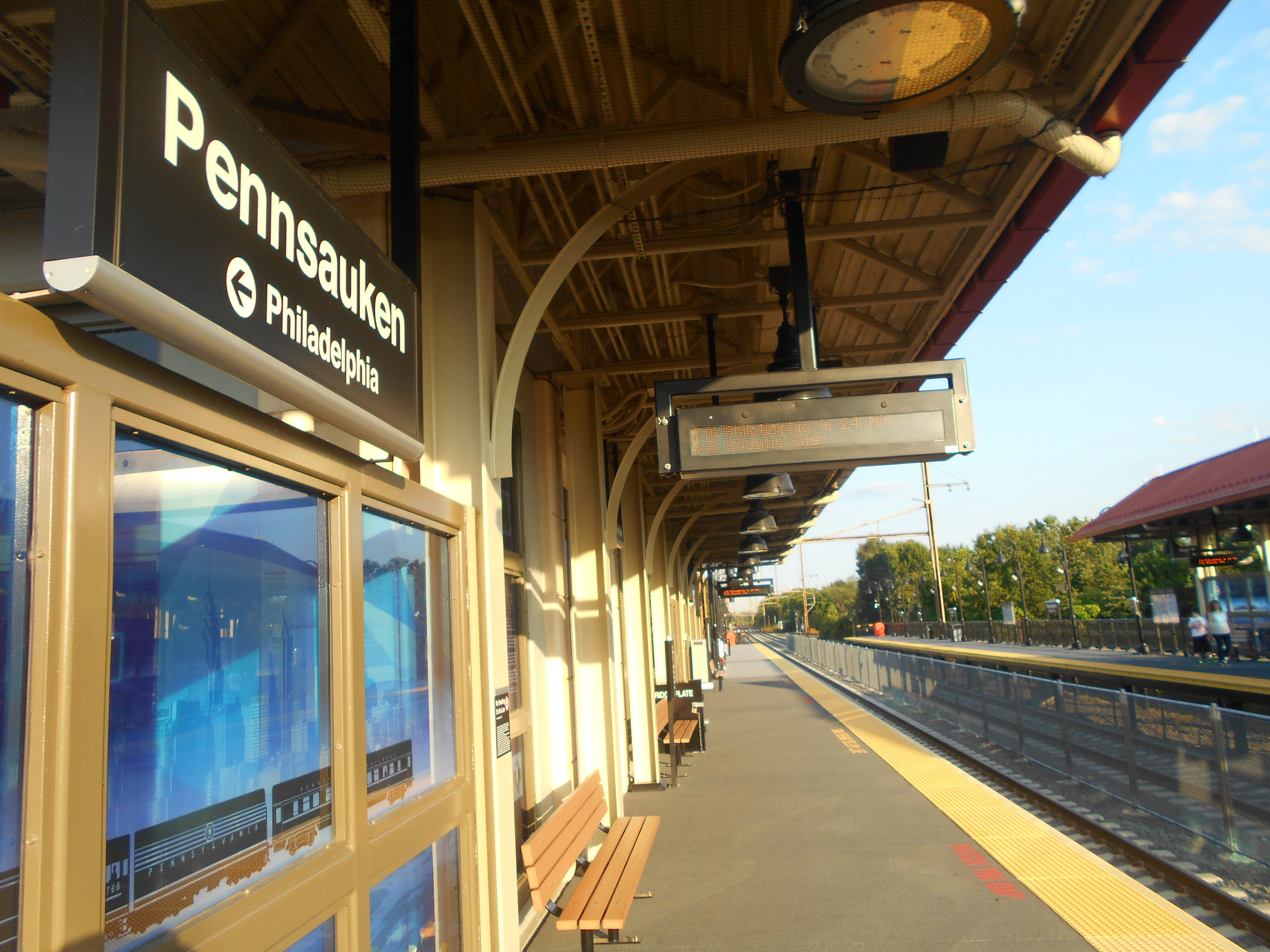
Pennsauken Transit Center

=== Roads and highways ===
As of May 2010, the township had a total of 144.85 miles (233.11 km) of roadways, of which 105.82 miles (170.30 km) were maintained by the municipality, 26.76 miles (43.07 km) by Camden County, 10.27 miles (16.53 km) by the New Jersey Department of Transportation and 2.00 miles (3.22 km) by the Delaware River Port Authority.

Major roads through the township include U.S. Route 130, the largest highway through the township, which intersects with Route 73 in the northern part of the township, near the Cinnaminson Township border. Route 90 is a short highway leading to the Betsy Ross Bridge, which connects the township with Philadelphia. Owned and operated by the Delaware River Port Authority, the bridge stretches 8,500 feet (2,600 m) between abutments and opened to traffic on April 30, 1976. Route 38 and Route 70 merge westbound in the eastern part of the township near the Cherry Hill border and U.S. Route 30 at the border with Camden.

U.S. 130 and U.S. 30 and Routes 38 and 70 converge at the Airport Circle in the southern section of Pennsauken Township, which has been called the first highway traffic circle in the United States. Originally opened in 1927, the circle has been reconfigured out of existence with a series of ramps and flyovers constructed in subsequent decades.

County Route 537 passes through in the south while County Route 543 travels through in the north.

=== Public transportation ===
The township hosts three NJ Transit rail stops. The Pennsauken–Route 73 station and 36th Street on the River Line offer service between Trenton and Camden. The Pennsauken Transit Center on River Road features a transfer between the River Line and the Atlantic City Line, which provides rail service between Atlantic City and Philadelphia. The station was constructed at a cost of $40 million and opened for commuters in October 2013.

Daily NJ Transit bus service between the township and Philadelphia is available on routes 317, 404, 406, and 409. Additional service to Philadelphia is available through routes 414 and 417, which run on weekdays during morning and evening rush hours. The township is also serviced by intrastate or local routes 405, 407, 413, and 419, as well as express route 418.

== Notable people ==
People who were born in, residents of, or otherwise closely associated with Pennsauken Township include:

- 3Breezy (born 1999), rapper, singer and songwriter
- Harold Amos (1918–2003), microbiologist and professor, who was the first black department chairman at Harvard Medical School
- Dotty Attie (born 1938), feminist painter and printmaker whose works are in the collections of The Museum of Modern Art, The Whitney Museum, and the Brooklyn Museum
- Albert E. Burling (1891–1960), Justice of the New Jersey Supreme Court from 1947 to 1960
- Bill Conaty (born 1973), former professional American football player who played center for nine seasons for the Buffalo Bills, Minnesota Vikings, Dallas Cowboys, and the Arizona Cardinals
- Jack Conners (born 1943), member of the New Jersey General Assembly from 1998 to 2011
- Mary Keating Croce (1928–2016), politician who served in the New Jersey General Assembly for three two-year terms, from 1974 to 1980, before serving as the Chairwoman of the New Jersey State Parole Board in the 1990s
- Krysten Cummings (born 1974/75), film and stage actress who appeared as Tina in the 1997 production of The Fix, and as Mimi in the 1998 version of the musical Rent
- Ron Curry (born 1993), professional basketball player for Krka of the Premier A Slovenian Basketball League
- Eric Dezenhall (born 1962), crisis management consultant and author
- George Dempsey (1929–2017), former professional basketball player who played five seasons (1954–1959) in the National Basketball Association as a member of the Philadelphia Warriors and Syracuse Nationals
- Vice Admiral Nanette M. DeRenzi, 42nd Judge Advocate General (JAG) of the United States Navy
- Al Fisher (born 1986), basketball player for Kent State University who was named 2008 MAC PLayer of the Year
- Carmen M. Garcia, former Chief judge of Municipal Court in Trenton, New Jersey
- Bill Gosper (born 1943), mathematician and pioneering computer programmer
- David Griggs (1967–1995), former NFL linebacker
- Dwight Hicks (born 1956), former player for the San Francisco 49ers
- Yaxel Lendeborg (born 2002), college basketball player for the UAB Blazers men's basketball team
- Todd McNair (born 1965), former NFL running back who played for the Kansas City Chiefs and Houston Oilers
- Bill Melchionni (born 1944), former National Basketball Association and American Basketball Association player
- Donald Norcross (born 1958), politician who has represented New Jersey's 1st congressional district since 2014, prior to which he served in the New Jersey General Assembly
- Jamal Parker (born 1998), professional gridiron football defensive back for the Winnipeg Blue Bombers of the Canadian Football League
- Delia Parr, author of historical fiction
- Steven M. Petrillo (born 1958), politician who served in the New Jersey General Assembly from 1994 to 1996
- Gary Schaer (born 1951), Council President of Passaic who represents the 36th Legislative District in the New Jersey General Assembly
- Frank Seward (1921–2004), pitcher who played for the New York Giants in 1943 and 1944
- Stephen M. Sweeney (born 1959), New Jersey State Senator (2002-2021) in the 3rd Legislative District and served as Senate President
- John Taylor (born 1962), wide receiver with the San Francisco 49ers
- Keith Taylor (born 1964), former NFL safety who played for the Indianapolis Colts, New Orleans Saints and Washington Redskins
- Jersey Joe Walcott (1914–1994), world heavyweight boxing champion from 1949 to 1952
- Kevin D. Walsh, attorney who is the acting New Jersey State Comptroller
- William Wesley (born 1964), NBA basketball player associate
- Darrell Wilson (born 1958), American football coach who is the defensive coordinator for the Wagner Seahawks football team

Preceded by Palmyra; Burlington County	Bordering communities of Philadelphia	Succeeded by Camden
