= Delia Parr =

American writer

Delia Parr is a pen name for the historical fiction author Mary Lechleidner.

Raised in Pennsauken Township, New Jersey, Parr attended Pennsauken High School and graduated from Rutgers University. She is a retired high school teacher who writes whenever possible. She is a mother of three grown children and now lives on Florida's Gulf Coast.

== Books ==
=== Candlewood Trilogy ===
1. A Hearth in Candlewood (2006)
2. Refining Emma (June 1, 2007)
3. Where Love Dwells (2008)

=== Home Ties Trilogy ===
1. Day By Day (June 1, 2007)
2. Abide With Me (2005)
3. Carry The Light (2006)

=== Trinity Series ===
1. A Place Called Trinity (2003)
2. Home to Trinity (2003)
3. The Midwife's Choice (Not yet on shelves)

=== Other Titles ===
- Evergreen (1995)
- The Fire in Autumn (1996)
- By Fate's Design (1996)
- The Ivory Duchess (1997)
- The Minister's Wife (1998)
- Sunrise (1999)
- Perfect Secrets (1999) by Delia Parr, Kathleen Kane, Judith O'Brien, and Brenda Joyce
- The Promise of Flowers (2000)
