= Keith Taylor (safety) =

American football player (born 1964)

No. 27, 29
- Position: Safety

Personal information
- Born: December 21, 1964 (age 61); Pennsauken Township, New Jersey, U.S.
- Listed height: 5 ft 11 in (1.80 m)
- Listed weight: 212 lb (96 kg)

Career information
- High school: Pennsauken (Pennsauken Township); St. John Bosco (Bellflower, California); Servite (Anaheim, California)
- College: Illinois
- NFL draft: 1988: 5th round, 134th overall pick

Career history
- New Orleans Saints (1988)*; Indianapolis Colts (1988–1991); New Orleans Saints (1992–1993); Washington Redskins (1994–1995); Carolina Panthers (1996)*; Washington Redskins (1996)
- * Offseason or practice squad member only

Career NFL statistics
- Tackles: 359
- Interceptions: 13
- Fumble recoveries: 4
- Stats at Pro Football Reference

Keith Gerard Taylor (born December 21, 1964) is an American former professional football player who was a safety in the National Football League (NFL) for the Indianapolis Colts, the New Orleans Saints, and the Washington Redskins. He played college football for the Illinois Fighting Illini and was selected in the fifth round of the 1988 NFL draft. Taylor played high school football at Pennsauken High School in New Jersey and is the younger brother of John Taylor who also played in the NFL as a wide receiver for the San Francisco 49ers.

Pre-draft measurables
Height	Weight	Hand span	40-yard dash	10-yard split	20-yard split	Bench press
5 ft 11 3/8 in (1.81 m)	193 lb (88 kg)	8 in (0.20 m)	4.56 s	1.53 s	2.61 s	14 reps
