= Kevin D. Walsh =

New Jersey state comptroller

Kevin D. Walsh is an American attorney. He was the acting New Jersey State Comptroller.

== Early life and education ==
Walsh grew up in Pennsauken Township, New Jersey, and graduated from Camden Catholic High School. His parents were Irish immigrants who ran a landscaping business. He has a Bachelor of Arts from the Catholic University of America and a Juris Doctor from the Rutgers School of Law–Camden.

== Career ==
After graduating from law school, Walsh was a leader in the movement to abolish New Jersey's death penalty, which was abolished in 2007. He then started working for the Fair Share Housing Center.

In 2020, Walsh was nominated by New Jersey governor Phil Murphy to be comptroller. He used the office to pursue cases of waste, fraud, and abuse in approximately 2,000 government-related entities. While in office, Walsh published a report showing that taxpayers paid over $1 million to a private police training firm that promoted discriminatory and unconstitutional tactics and released an investigation that found two nursing homes diverted more than tens of millions in Medicaid funds to themselves and their private businesses, while understaffing facilities.

In December 2025, Democratic lawmakers advanced a bill that would take away powers of the Office of the State Comptroller, removing its power to subpoena and make it rely on the State Commission of Investigation. The bills lead proponent was Nicholas Scutari, the Democratic Senate president. After an uproar over the bill, it was abandoned less than two weeks later, which Walsh credited to the support of those who "showed up to fight for government oversight, transparency and accountability!".
