= New Jersey State Comptroller =

Independent government agency in New Jersey, United States

The New Jersey Office of the State Comptroller (OSC) is an independent agency of the government of New Jersey created by an act of the state legislature in 2007 in order to make government more efficient, accountable and transparent. The state comptroller is appointed by the governor of New Jersey, with the advice and consent of the New Jersey Senate, to a renewable six-year term.

In 2010, the powers and responsibilities of the Office of the State Inspector General and the Medicaid Inspector General were incorporated under OSC.

== Responsibilities of the Office of the State Comptroller ==
The New Jersey Office of the State Comptroller is tasked with examining all aspects of government expenditures in New Jersey, including:

- Reviewing public contracts;
- Auditing the performance and efficacy of the executive branch of State government, local governments, state colleges and universities, state agencies, and independent state authorities;
- Investigating government waste, fraud and abuse and issuing investigative reports to the public; and
- Detecting and uncovering Medicaid fraud and recovering misspent taxpayer funds.

OSC has four divisions: Audit, Investigations, Medicaid Fraud, and Procurement, along with a COVID-19 Compliance and Oversight Project and a Police Accountability Project.

== Notable reports ==
OSC’s audits have resulted in cost savings for the State of New Jersey and inspired legislative reforms. A 2010 audit found that nearly one in six state phone lines was unused, and cutting them off resulted in the State saving $3.2 million annually. In 2016, an OSC audit found that public colleges and universities were relying heavily on high mandatory student fees without justifying their increases each year. In response, the Legislature required public colleges to adopt OSC’s recommendations and make fee increases more transparent.

In 2019, an OSC audit of the Economic Development Authority (EDA) found insufficient oversight of businesses that received tax incentives, along with a lack of data to show whether incented jobs were actually created or retained as the tax incentive program required. OSC’s statutorily-required follow-up review of the EDA is currently underway.

Notable investigations released by the Division include a 2012 report on the Delaware River Port Authority that found it wasted millions in toll payer money to the benefit its commissioners; a 2014 investigation into the Newark Watershed Corporation that uncovered the executive director’s self-dealing and risky investment activity; and a 2011 report that the state was spending millions every year on clothing allowances for white-collar workers who do not even wear uniforms.

More recently, the Investigations Division identified a loophole in how the state administers workers’ compensation benefits that allowed insurance companies to pass costs onto the pension fund, exacerbating its underfunded status. The Investigations Division also conducts regular reviews of the New Jersey State Police’s (NJSP) motor vehicle stop activities, internal affairs and disciplinary processes, and training as part of a statutorily-required effort to ensure the NJSP does not tolerate racial profiling or other discriminatory conduct by State Troopers. The most recent report was issued in 2022.

== People ==
- Kevin D. Walsh, 2020 to present (Acting), appointed by Governor Philip Murphy
- Philip Degnan 2015 to present, appointed by Governor Chris Christie
- Marc Larkins 2013 to 2015 (Acting), appointed by Governor Chris Christie
- Matthew Boxer 2008 to 2013, first under recreation, appointed by Governor Jon Corzine
