= List of NFC champions =

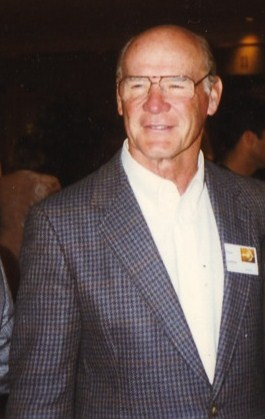
Tom Landry was the head coach for five NFC champions (all with the Dallas Cowboys), more than any other head coach.

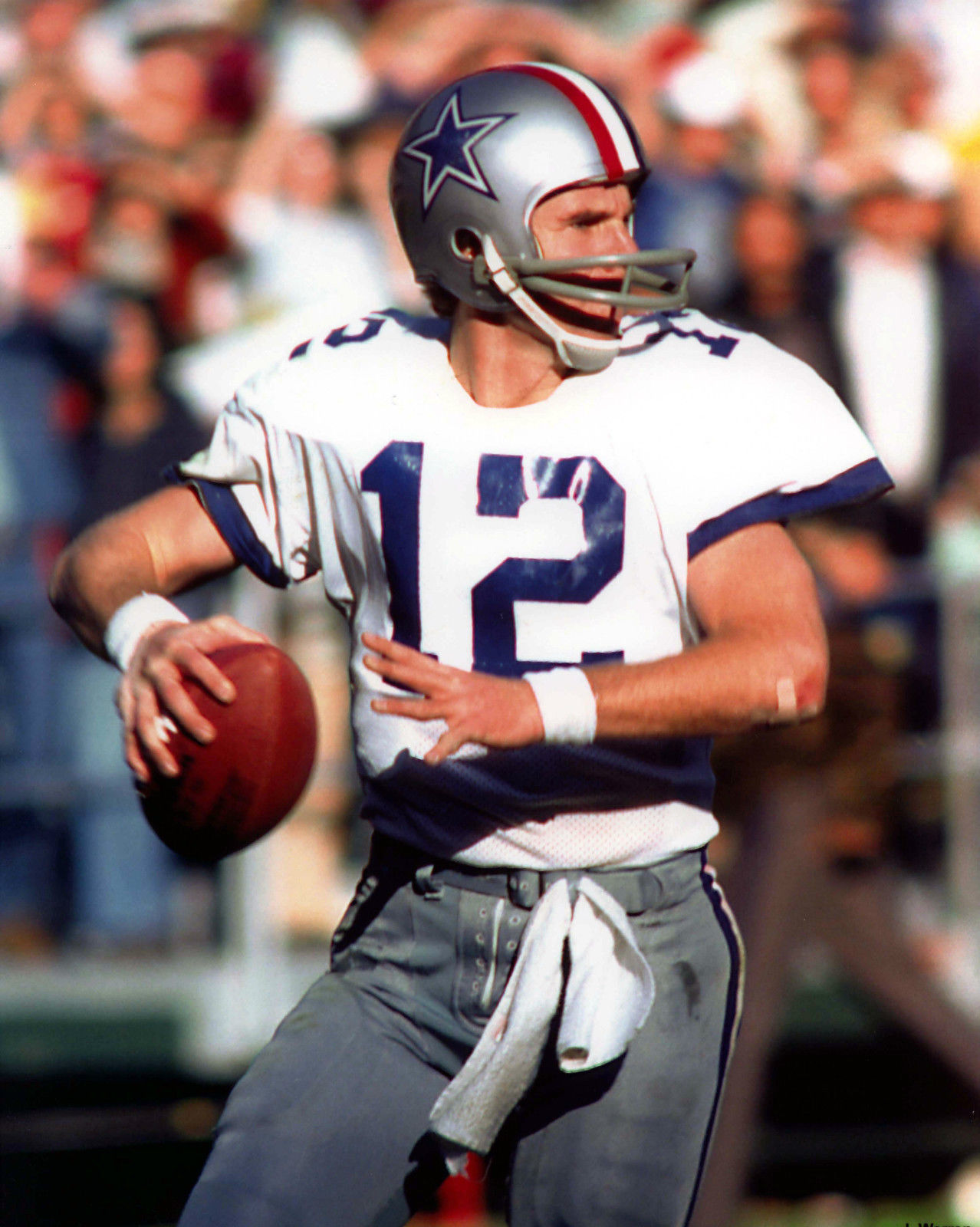
Roger Staubach was the starting quarterback for four NFC championship teams.

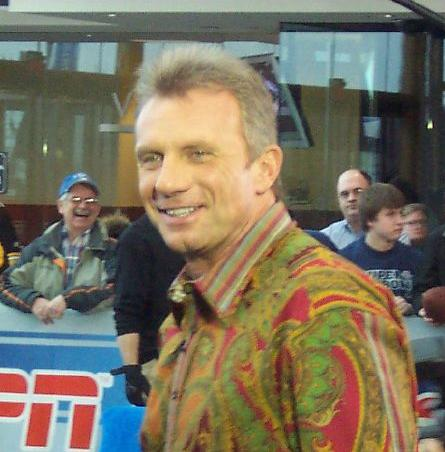
Joe Montana was the starting quarterback for four NFC championship teams with the San Francisco 49ers.

The National Football Conference (NFC) is one of two conferences within the National Football League (NFL), the American Football Conference (AFC) being the other. Prior to 1970, there were two separate professional football leagues, the National Football League and the American Football League (AFL). In 1970, the AFL merged with the NFL. As part of the merger, the former AFL teams, plus three former NFL teams (Baltimore Colts, Cleveland Browns, and Pittsburgh Steelers), were placed in the AFC. The remaining former NFL teams were placed in the NFC. As of the 2025 season only the Detroit Lions have not won an NFC championship.

== Background ==
The NFC champion is not necessarily the team with the best record in the regular season. Rather, the champion is decided by the NFC Championship Game as part of the post-season playoffs involving the teams with the best regular season records. The Dallas Cowboys won the first two NFC championships, in 1970 and 1971. No team has won more than two consecutive NFC championships. The Cowboys won two consecutive NFC championships three times (1970–1971, 1977–1978, 1992–1993). The Minnesota Vikings (1973–1974), Washington Redskins (1982–1983), San Francisco 49ers (1988–1989), Green Bay Packers (1996–1997), and Seattle Seahawks (2013–2014) have also won two consecutive NFC championships.

Through the 2024 season, the Dallas Cowboys and San Francisco 49ers have won more NFC championships than any other team, with eight. The Philadelphia Eagles, Washington Redskins, New York Giants, and Los Angeles/St. Louis Rams have each won five NFC championships. The Minnesota Vikings, Green Bay Packers, and Seattle Seahawks have won three apiece. The San Francisco 49ers have also been the NFC runner up, as a result of losing the NFC Championship Game, a record 11 times. The Rams, Cowboys and Packers have each been the runner up six times.

The record for the most regular season wins by an NFC champion is 15, by the 1984 San Francisco 49ers, the 1985 Chicago Bears and the 2015 Carolina Panthers, each with a 15–1 record in a 16-game season, and the 2024 Detroit Lions with a 15–2 record in a 17-game season. Excluding the strike-shortened 1982 season, the fewest wins by an NFC champion in a complete season were by the 1979 Los Angeles Rams, 2008 Arizona Cardinals, and the 2011 New York Giants, who each had a 9–7 record.

Tom Landry was the head coach for five NFC championships, more than any other head coach. Landry coached the Dallas Cowboys to NFC championships in 1970, 1971, 1975, 1977 and 1978. Joe Gibbs coached four NFC champions, and Bud Grant, Bill Walsh and Mike Holmgren each coached three. Holmgren and Dick Vermeil both won NFC championships for two different franchises. Holmgren was the head coach of the 1996 and 1997 NFC champion Green Bay Packers and of the 2005 NFC champion Seattle Seahawks. Vermeil was the head coach of the 1980 NFC champion Philadelphia Eagles, and 19 years later was the head coach of the 1999 NFC champion St. Louis Rams.

Roger Staubach and Joe Montana were each the starting quarterback for four NFC championships, more than any other quarterback. Staubach was the starting quarterback for the 1971, 1975, 1977 and 1978 Dallas Cowboys. Montana was the starting quarterback for the 1981, 1984, 1988 and 1989 San Francisco 49ers. Fran Tarkenton, Troy Aikman and Kurt Warner were each the starting quarterback for three NFC champions. Warner accomplished this for two different franchises, the 1999 and 2001 St. Louis Rams and the 2008 Arizona Cardinals. Joe Theismann, Phil Simms, Brett Favre, Eli Manning, Russell Wilson and Jalen Hurts were each the starting quarterback for two NFC champions, although Simms missed the NFC Championship Game in one of those seasons (1990) due to injury.

Chuck Foreman and Emmitt Smith were each the leader in rushing yards for an NFC champion three times. Others who led an NFC champion in rushing yards multiple times are Duane Thomas, Tony Dorsett, John Riggins, Wendell Tyler, Roger Craig, Marshall Faulk and Marshawn Lynch. Tyler did so with two different franchises, the 1979 Los Angeles Rams and the 1984 San Francisco 49ers. Jerry Rice and Michael Irvin each led an NFC champion in receiving yards three times. Bob Hayes, Drew Pearson, Charlie Brown, Dwight Clark, Gary Clark, Antonio Freeman and A. J. Brown each led an NFC champion in receiving yards twice.

The 1983 Washington Redskins had seven 1st team All-Pros, more than any other NFC champion. The 2012 San Francisco 49ers and 2015 Carolina Panthers each had six and 1985 Chicago Bears had five. The 1975 Dallas Cowboys, 2000 New York Giants and 2007 New York Giants did not have any 1st team All-Pros. Ron Yary of the 1973, 1974 and 1976 Minnesota Vikings is the only offensive lineman with three 1st team All-Pro selections for an NFC champion. Several defensive players have been 1st team All-Pros for two NFC champions, including Alan Page, Cliff Harris, Ronnie Lott, LeRoy Butler, Richard Sherman and Earl Thomas.

The Super Bowl is played annually between the AFC champion and the NFC champion. The first four Super Bowls were played prior to the AFL–NFL merger between the AFL and NFL champion. The 1970 NFC champion Dallas Cowboys lost the first Super Bowl played after the merger, but the 1971 Cowboys were the first NFC team to win the Super Bowl. The NFC had a streak in which its champion won 13 consecutive Super Bowls, from the 1984 NFC champion San Francisco 49ers through the 1996 NFC champion Green Bay Packers. Overall, the NFC champion has won 27 of the 54 Super Bowls played since the formation of the NFC with the AFL–NFL merger through the end of the 2023 season.

== Key ==
Season	Each year is linked to an article about that particular NFL season.
Team	Name of NFC Championship team, linked to the team's championship season
Record	Championship team's regular season record wins–losses; if the team played any tie games the record is shown as wins–losses–ties
Head Coach	Championship team's head coach; if the team had multiple head coaches for the season they are shown in decreasing order of number of regular season wins
Quarterback	Name of quarterback with most passing attempts for the team during the regular season
Leading Rusher	Name of player with most rushing yards for the team during the regular season
Leading Receiver	Name of player with most receiving yards for the team during the regular season
All-Pros	List of All-Pros on that season's NFC champion
Runner Up	Name of team that lost the NFC Championship Game
†	Super Bowl Champion
*	Member of Pro Football Hall of Fame

== NFC championship teams ==
Season	Team	Record	Head Coach	Quarterback	Leading Rusher	Leading Receiver	All-Pros	Runner-up	Reference
1970	Dallas Cowboys	10–4	Tom Landry*	Craig Morton	Duane Thomas	Bob Hayes*	Howley	San Francisco 49ers	
1971	Dallas Cowboys†	11–3	Tom Landry*	Roger Staubach*	Duane Thomas	Bob Hayes*	Lilly*, Niland, Wright*	San Francisco 49ers	
1972	Washington Redskins	11–3	George Allen*	Billy Kilmer	Larry Brown	Charley Taylor*	Brown, Hanburger*	Dallas Cowboys	
1973	Minnesota Vikings	12–2	Bud Grant*	Fran Tarkenton*	Chuck Foreman	John Gilliam	Eller*, Page*, Yary*	Dallas Cowboys	
1974	Minnesota Vikings	10–4	Bud Grant*	Fran Tarkenton*	Chuck Foreman	Jim Lash	Page*, Yary*	Los Angeles Rams	
1975	Dallas Cowboys	10–4	Tom Landry*	Roger Staubach*	Robert Newhouse	Drew Pearson*	none	Los Angeles Rams	
1976	Minnesota Vikings	11–2–1	Bud Grant*	Fran Tarkenton*	Chuck Foreman	Sammy White	Yary*	Los Angeles Rams	
1977	Dallas Cowboys†	12–2	Tom Landry*	Roger Staubach*	Tony Dorsett*	Drew Pearson*	Harris, Herrera, Martin, Pearson*	Minnesota Vikings	
1978	Dallas Cowboys	12–4	Tom Landry*	Roger Staubach*	Tony Dorsett*	Tony Hill	Harris, White*	Los Angeles Rams	
1979	Los Angeles Rams	9–7	Ray Malavasi	Pat Haden^{[a]}	Wendell Tyler	Preston Dennard	Brooks, Youngblood*	Tampa Bay Buccaneers	
1980	Philadelphia Eagles	12–4	Dick Vermeil	Ron Jaworski	Wilbert Montgomery	Charlie Smith	Johnson	Dallas Cowboys	
1981	San Francisco 49ers†	13–3	Bill Walsh*	Joe Montana*	Ricky Patton	Dwight Clark	Dean*, Lott*	Dallas Cowboys	
1982	Washington Redskins†	8–1	Joe Gibbs*	Joe Theismann	John Riggins*	Charlie Brown	Moseley	Dallas Cowboys	
1983	Washington Redskins	14–2	Joe Gibbs*	Joe Theismann	John Riggins*	Charlie Brown	Butz, Grimm*, Jacoby, Murphy, Nelms, Riggins*, Theismann	San Francisco 49ers	
1984	San Francisco 49ers†	15–1	Bill Walsh*	Joe Montana*	Wendell Tyler	Dwight Clark	Fahnhorst	Chicago Bears	
1985	Chicago Bears†	15–1	Mike Ditka*	Jim McMahon	Walter Payton*	Willie Gault	Covert, Dent*, McMichael*, Payton*, Singletary*	Los Angeles Rams	
1986	New York Giants†	14–2	Bill Parcells*	Phil Simms	Joe Morris	Mark Bavaro	Bavaro, Landeta, Morris, Taylor*	Washington Redskins	
1987	Washington Redskins†	11–4	Joe Gibbs*	Jay Schroeder^{[b]}	George Rogers	Gary Clark	Clark, Wilburn	Minnesota Vikings	
1988	San Francisco 49ers†	10–6	Bill Walsh*	Joe Montana*	Roger Craig	Jerry Rice*	Craig, Rice*	Chicago Bears	
1989	San Francisco 49ers†	14–2	George Seifert	Joe Montana*	Roger Craig	Jerry Rice*	Cofer, Lott*, Montana*, Rice*,	Los Angeles Rams	
1990	New York Giants†	13–3	Bill Parcells*	Phil Simms^{[c]}	Ottis Anderson	Stephen Baker	Johnson, Landeta	San Francisco 49ers	
1991	Washington Redskins†	14–2	Joe Gibbs*	Mark Rypien	Earnest Byner	Gary Clark	Green*, Lachey	Detroit Lions	
1992	Dallas Cowboys†	13–3	Jimmy Johnson*	Troy Aikman*	Emmitt Smith*	Michael Irvin*	Novacek, Smith*	San Francisco 49ers	
1993	Dallas Cowboys†	12–4	Jimmy Johnson*	Troy Aikman*	Emmitt Smith*	Michael Irvin*	Smith*, Williams	San Francisco 49ers	
1994	San Francisco 49ers†	13–3	George Seifert	Steve Young*	Ricky Watters	Jerry Rice*	Rice*, Sanders*, Young*	Dallas Cowboys	
1995	Dallas Cowboys†	12–4	Barry Switzer	Troy Aikman*	Emmitt Smith*	Michael Irvin*	Newton, Smith*, Woodson	Green Bay Packers	
1996	Green Bay Packers†	13–3	Mike Holmgren	Brett Favre*	Edgar Bennett	Antonio Freeman	Butler, Favre*	Carolina Panthers	
1997	Green Bay Packers	13–3	Mike Holmgren	Brett Favre*	Dorsey Levens	Antonio Freeman	Butler, Favre*	San Francisco 49ers	
1998	Atlanta Falcons	14–2	Dan Reeves	Chris Chandler	Jamal Anderson	Tony Martin	Anderson	Minnesota Vikings	
1999	St. Louis Rams†	13–3	Dick Vermeil	Kurt Warner*	Marshall Faulk*	Isaac Bruce*	Carter, Faulk*, Pace*, Warner*	Tampa Bay Buccaneers	
2000	New York Giants	12–4	Jim Fassel	Kerry Collins	Tiki Barber	Amani Toomer	none	Minnesota Vikings	
2001	St. Louis Rams	14–2	Mike Martz	Kurt Warner*	Marshall Faulk*	Torry Holt	Conwell, Faulk*, Pace*, Timmerman, Warner*, Williams*,	Philadelphia Eagles	
2002	Tampa Bay Buccaneers†	12–4	Jon Gruden	Brad Johnson	Michael Pittman	Keyshawn Johnson	Barber*, Brooks*, Lynch*, Rice, Sapp*	Philadelphia Eagles	
2003	Carolina Panthers	11–5	John Fox	Jake Delhomme	Stephen Davis	Steve Smith	Jenkins	Philadelphia Eagles	
2004	Philadelphia Eagles	13–3	Andy Reid	Donovan McNabb	Brian Westbrook	Terrell Owens*	Akers, Dawkins*, Owens*, Sheppard	Atlanta Falcons	
2005	Seattle Seahawks	13–3	Mike Holmgren	Matt Hasselbeck	Shaun Alexander	Bobby Engram	Alexander, Hutchinson, Jones*, Strong	Carolina Panthers	
2006	Chicago Bears	13–3	Lovie Smith	Rex Grossman	Thomas Jones	Muhsin Muhammad	Ayanbadejo,Briggs, Gould, Hester, Kreutz, Urlacher*	New Orleans Saints	
2007	New York Giants†	10–6	Tom Coughlin	Eli Manning	Brandon Jacobs	Plaxico Burress	none	Green Bay Packers	
2008	Arizona Cardinals	9–7	Ken Whisenhunt	Kurt Warner*	Edgerrin James*	Larry Fitzgerald	Fitzgerald, Wilson	Philadelphia Eagles	
2009	New Orleans Saints†	13–3	Sean Payton	Drew Brees	Pierre Thomas	Marques Colston	Brees, Evans, Sharper	Minnesota Vikings	
2010	Green Bay Packers†	10–6	Mike McCarthy	Aaron Rodgers	Brandon Jackson	Greg Jennings	Collins, Matthews, Woodson*	Chicago Bears	
2011	New York Giants†	9–7	Tom Coughlin	Eli Manning	Ahmad Bradshaw	Victor Cruz	Cruz, Pierre-Paul	San Francisco 49ers	
2012	San Francisco 49ers	11–4–1	Jim Harbaugh	Colin Kaepernick^{[d]}	Frank Gore	Michael Crabtree	Bowman, Brooks, Goldson, Iupati, Lee, Smith, Smith, Staley, Willis*	Atlanta Falcons	
2013	Seattle Seahawks†	13–3	Pete Carroll	Russell Wilson	Marshawn Lynch	Golden Tate	Chancellor,Sherman, Thomas	San Francisco 49ers	
2014	Seattle Seahawks	12–4	Pete Carroll	Russell Wilson	Marshawn Lynch	Doug Baldwin	Chancellor, Lynch,Sherman, Thomas, Wagner	Green Bay Packers	
2015	Carolina Panthers	15–1	Ron Rivera	Cam Newton	Jonathan Stewart	Greg Olsen	Davis, Kalil, Kuechly, Newton, Norman, Olsen, Short,Tolbert	Arizona Cardinals	
2016	Atlanta Falcons	11–5	Dan Quinn	Matt Ryan	Devonta Freeman	Julio Jones	Beasley, Jones, Mack, Ryan	Green Bay Packers	
2017	Philadelphia Eagles†	13–3	Doug Pederson	Carson Wentz^{[e]}	LeGarrette Blount	Zach Ertz	Johnson, Kelce, Wentz, Cox	Minnesota Vikings	
2018	Los Angeles Rams	13–3	Sean McVay	Jared Goff	Todd Gurley	Robert Woods	Donald, Gurley, Hekker, Littleton	New Orleans Saints	
2019	San Francisco 49ers	13–3	Kyle Shanahan^{[f]}	Jimmy Garoppolo	Raheem Mostert	George Kittle	Kittle, Sherman, Buckner	Green Bay Packers	
2020	Tampa Bay Buccaneers†	11–5	Bruce Arians	Tom Brady	Leonard Fournette	Mike Evans	David, White	Green Bay Packers	
2021	Los Angeles Rams†	12–5	Sean McVay	Matthew Stafford	Sony Michel	Cooper Kupp	Kupp, Donald, Ramsey	San Francisco 49ers	
2022	Philadelphia Eagles	14–3	Nick Sirianni	Jalen Hurts	Miles Sanders	A. J. Brown	Johnson, Kelce, Hurts, Brown, Reddick, Bradberry	San Francisco 49ers	
2023	San Francisco 49ers	12–5	Kyle Shanahan	Brock Purdy	Christian McCaffrey	Brandon Aiyuk	Juszczyk, Kittle, McCaffrey, Warner, Williams, Aiyuk, Ward	Detroit Lions	
2024	Philadelphia Eagles†	14–3	Nick Sirianni	Jalen Hurts	Saquon Barkley	A. J. Brown	Barkley, Baun, Brown, Mailata, Johnson, Carter	Washington Commanders	
2025	Seattle Seahawks†	14–3	Mike Macdonald	Sam Darnold	Kenneth Walker III	Jaxon Smith-Njigba	Smith-Njigba, Dickson, Jones, Williams, Witherspoon	Los Angeles Rams	

== Footnotes ==
- ^{a} Pat Haden was the Los Angeles Rams' starting quarterback for most of the 1979 season. After he broke a finger late in the season Vince Ferragamo replaced him at quarterback for the last three regular season games, and was also the quarterback for the NFC Championship game and Super Bowl XIV.
- ^{b} Jay Schroeder was the Washington Redskins starting quarterback for most of the 1987 season. But Doug Williams replaced him several times during the season and was the Redskins quarterback for the NFC Championship game and Super Bowl XXII.
- ^{c} Phil Simms was the starting quarterback for the 1990 New York Giants until suffering a leg injury late in the season. As a result, Jeff Hostetler was the Giants starting quarterback for the last two regular season games and for the postseason, including the NFC Championship game and Super Bowl XXV.
- ^{d} Colin Kaepernick and Alex Smith both finished the 2012 season with 218 attempts. Smith started the first nine games of the season before suffering a concussion. Kaepernick took over as starter the following week and remained the starter when Smith was cleared to play the week after that. Kaepernick was the 49ers starting quarterback for the final seven regular season games and the postseason, including the NFC Championship Game. He also started in Super Bowl XLVII.
- ^{e} Carson Wentz was the starting quarterback for the 2017 Philadelphia Eagles until suffering an injury late in the season. As a result, Nick Foles was the Eagles' starting quarterback for the last three regular season games and for the postseason, including the NFC Championship game. He also started Super Bowl LII.
- ^{f} Kyle Shanahan and his father Mike Shanahan are the first father-son head coaches to make appearances in the Super Bowl.
