= 1989 San Francisco 49ers season =

American football team season

- Owner: Eddie DeBartolo, Jr.
- General manager: John McVay and Carmen Policy
- Head coach: George Seifert
- Offensive coordinator: Mike Holmgren
- Defensive coordinator: Bill McPherson
- Home stadium: Candlestick Park

Results
- Record: 14–2
- Division place: 1st NFC West
- Playoffs: Won Divisional Playoffs (vs. Vikings) 41–13; Won NFC Championship (vs. Rams) 30–3; Won Super Bowl XXIV (vs. Broncos) 55–10
- All-Pros: 8: QB Joe Montana; RB Roger Craig; WR Jerry Rice; PR/WR John Taylor; LB Mike Walter; CB Don Griffin; FS Ronnie Lott; K Mike Cofer
- Pro Bowlers: 6: QB Joe Montana; RB Roger Craig; WR Jerry Rice; WR John Taylor; G Guy McIntyre; FS Ronnie Lott

The 1989 season was the San Francisco 49ers' 40th in the National Football League (NFL), their 44th overall and their first season under head coach George Seifert. After going 14–2 in the regular season, the 49ers completed the season with one of the most dominant playoff runs of all time, outscoring opponents 126–26, on their way to winning Super Bowl XXIV. The 49ers' Super Bowl victory, a 55–10 defeat of the Denver Broncos, was their second consecutive and fourth overall. They finished with the best record in the NFL for the second time in three years, with their two losses being by a combined five points. The 49ers became the second team in NFL history to win four Super Bowls, the first being the Pittsburgh Steelers.

In 2007, ESPN.com's Page 2 ranked the 1989 49ers as the greatest team in Super Bowl history.

This was the season where the 49ers added the black trim on the SF logo on the helmets which lasted until the 1995 season.

Quarterback Joe Montana had one of the greatest statistical passing seasons in NFL history in terms of efficiency in 1989. Montana set a then-NFL record with a passer rating of 112.4, with a completion percentage of 70.2%, and a 26/8 touchdown-to-interception ratio.

In the playoffs, Montana had arguably the greatest postseason performance by any quarterback in NFL history. He posted a 78.3% completion percentage, 800 yards, 11 touchdowns, zero interceptions, and a 146.4 passer rating. Cold Hard Football Facts calls Montana's 1989 season "the one by which we must measure all other passing seasons."

The 1989 49ers ranked #5 on the 100 greatest teams of all time presented by the NFL on its 100th anniversary.

== Offseason ==
=== NFL draft ===
1989 San Francisco 49ers draft
Round	Selection	Player	Position	College	Notes
1	28	Keith DeLong	LB	Tennessee	
2	56	Wesley Walls	TE	Mississippi	
3	84	Keith Henderson	RB	Georgia	
4	112	Michael Barber	WR	Marshall	
5	122	Johnnie Jackson	CB	Houston	from Los Angeles Raiders
6	167	Steve Hendrickson	LB	California	
9	251	Rudy Harmon	LB	LSU	
10	279	Andy Sinclair	C	Stanford	
11	289	Jim Bell	RB	Boston College	from Los Angeles Raiders
11	307	Norm McGee	WR	North Dakota	
12	319	Antonio Goss	LB	North Carolina	from Los Angeles Raiders

=== Undrafted free agents ===
1989 undrafted free agents of note
Player	Position	College
Steve Berg	Defensive End	Gustavus Adolphus
Jon Burman	Tackle	Illinois
Matt Devine	Linebacker	UC Davis
Art Malone	Defensive Back	Washington
Jeff Nedved	Wide receiver	Cal-State Hayward
Mike Wolfe	Tackle	Oklahoma State

== Training camp ==
The 1989 San Francisco 49ers season held training camp at Sierra College in Rocklin, California.

== Personnel ==
=== Staff ===
1989 San Francisco 49ers staff
Front office: Owner/president – Edward J. DeBartolo, Jr.; Executive vice president/general counsel – Carmen Policy; Vice president/general manager – John McVay; Administrator of football operations – Neal Dahlen; Director of college scouting – Tony Razzano; Director of pro personnel – Allan Webb; Head coaches: Head coach – George Seifert; Offensive coaches: Offensive coordinator/quarterbacks – Mike Holmgren; Running backs – Al Lavan; Wide receivers – Sherman Lewis; Tight ends – Lynn Stiles; Offensive line – Bobb McKittrick	Defensive coaches: Defensive coordinator – Bill McPherson; Defensive line – John Marshall; Linebackers – Bob Zeman; Defensive backs – Ray Rhodes; Defensive assistant – Tommy Hart; Special teams coaches: Special teams coordinator – Lynn Stiles; Strength and conditioning: Physical development coordinator – Jerry Attaway

=== Roster ===
1989 San Francisco 49ers roster
Quarterbacks (QB): 8 Steve Young; 13 Steve Bono; 16 Joe Montana; Running backs (RB): 23 Spencer Tillman; 30 Keith Henderson; 32 Terrence Flagler; 33 Roger Craig; 44 Tom Rathman FB; Wide receivers (WR): 80 Jerry Rice; 82 John Taylor; 85 Mike Wilson; Tight ends (TE): 81 Jamie Williams; 84 Brent Jones; 89 Wesley Walls	Offensive linemen (OL): 60 Chuck Thomas C; 61 Jesse Sapolu C; 62 Guy McIntyre G; 66 Terry Tausch G; 69 Bruce Collie G; 74 Steve Wallace T; 77 Bubba Paris T; 79 Harris Barton T; Defensive linemen (DL): 64 Jim Burt NT; 67 Pete Kugler NT; 75 Kevin Fagan DE; 76 Rollin Putzier DE; 78 Pierce Holt DE; 91 Larry Roberts DE; 96 Danny Stubbs DE	Linebackers (LB): 53 Bill Romanowski OLB; 54 Matt Millen ILB; 56 Steve Hendrickson ILB; 58 Keena Turner OLB; 59 Keith DeLong ILB; 94 Charles Haley OLB; 98 Antonio Goss OLB; 99 Michael Walter ILB; Defensive backs (DB): 21 Eric Wright CB; 22 Tim McKyer CB; 26 Darryl Pollard CB; 29 Don Griffin CB; 31 Chet Brooks SS; 40 Johnnie Jackson SS; 42 Ronnie Lott FS; 46 Tom Holmoe FS; Special teams (ST): 6 Mike Cofer K; 9 Barry Helton P	Practice squad: 68 Dave Cullity T; 92 Jeff Roth NT; 63 Ricky Siglar G/T; 97 Jeff Stephenson LB; Reserve: 24 Harry Sydney RB (IR); 49 Jeff Fuller S (IR); 50 Riki Ellison LB (IR); 55 Jim Fahnhorst LB (IR); 65 Jeff Bregel G (IR); 72 Jeff Stover DE (PUP); 83 Terry Greer WR (IR); 88 Mike Sherrard WR (PUP); 95 Michael Carter NT (IR); -- Chris Washington LB (IR); Rookies in italics 47 active, 10 reserve, 4 practice squad

== Preseason ==
=== Schedule ===
Week	Date	Opponent	Result	Record	Venue	Attendance	Recap
1	August 5	Los Angeles Rams	L 13–16 (OT)	0–1	(Japan) Tokyo Dome	43,896	Recap
2	August 12	at Los Angeles Raiders	W 37–7	1–1	Los Angeles Memorial Coliseum	36,739	Recap
3	August 19	Denver Broncos	W 35–17	2–1	Candlestick Park	58,641	Recap
4	August 23	San Diego Chargers	W 17–14	3–1	Candlestick Park	54,471	Recap
5	September 1	at Seattle Seahawks	L 17–28	3–2	Kingdome	58,641	Recap

== Regular season ==
The 49ers' offense was just as dominating as it had been during the previous regular season. Quarterback Joe Montana threw for 3,512 yards, 26 touchdowns, and only 8 interceptions, giving him what was then the highest passer rating in NFL history (112.4). Montana also rushed for 227 yards and 3 touchdowns, and earned both the NFL Most Valuable Player Award and the NFL Offensive Player of the Year Award. Wide receiver Jerry Rice had another outstanding season, catching 82 passes for 1,483 yards and 17 touchdowns. Running back Roger Craig was the team's leading rusher with 1,054 yards and 6 touchdowns, and he recorded 49 receptions for 473 yards and another touchdown.

But other stars on the 49ers' offense began to emerge, enabling the team to spread the ball around. After being used primarily as a punt returner during his first 2 seasons, wide receiver John Taylor had a breakout season, catching 60 passes for 1,077 yards and 10 touchdowns, while also returning 36 punts for 417 yards. Tight end Brent Jones recorded 40 receptions for 500 yards. Fullback Tom Rathman had the best season of his career, rushing for 305 yards and catching 73 passes for 616 yards. Even Montana's backup, quarterback Steve Young, had a great year, throwing for 1,001 yards and 8 touchdowns with only 3 interceptions, while also rushing for 126 yards and 2 touchdowns. With all of these weapons, San Francisco's offense led the league in total yards from scrimmage (6,268) and scoring (442 points).

The 49ers' defense was ranked #3 in the NFL. Three starters from the defense made the 1989 All-Pro Team: Ronnie Lott, Don Griffin, and Michael Walter.

=== Schedule ===
Week	Date	Opponent	Result	Record	Venue	Attendance	Recap
1	September 10	at Indianapolis Colts	**W** 30–24	1–0	Hoosier Dome	60,111	Recap
2	September 17	at Tampa Bay Buccaneers	**W** 20–16	2–0	Tampa Stadium	64,087	Recap
3	September 24	at Philadelphia Eagles	**W** 38–28	3–0	Veterans Stadium	66,042	Recap
4	October 1	**Los Angeles Rams**	**L** 12–13	3–1	Candlestick Park	64,250	Recap
5	October 8	at **New Orleans Saints**	**W** 24–20	4–1	Louisiana Superdome	60,488	Recap
6	October 15	at Dallas Cowboys	**W** 31–14	5–1	Texas Stadium	61,077	Recap
7	October 22	New England Patriots	**W** 37–20	6–1	Stanford Stadium (Note: The 49ers were originally scheduled to play the New England Patriots during Week 7 (October 22) at Candlestick Park in San Francisco. However, due to the impact and damage to Candlestick Park resulting from the Loma Prieta earthquake, the game was played at Stanford Stadium.)	51,781	Recap
8	October 29	at New York Jets	**W** 23–10	7–1	Giants Stadium	62,805	Recap
9	November 6	**New Orleans Saints**	**W** 31–13	8–1	Candlestick Park	60,667	Recap
10	November 12	**Atlanta Falcons**	**W** 45–3	9–1	Candlestick Park	59,914	Recap
11	November 19	Green Bay Packers	**L** 17–21	9–2	Candlestick Park	62,219	Recap
12	November 27	New York Giants	**W** 34–24	10–2	Candlestick Park	63,461	Recap
13	December 3	at **Atlanta Falcons**	**W** 23–10	11–2	Atlanta–Fulton County Stadium	43,128	Recap
14	December 11	at **Los Angeles Rams**	**W** 30–27	12–2	Anaheim Stadium	67,959	Recap
15	December 17	Buffalo Bills	**W** 21–10	13–2	Candlestick Park	60,927	Recap
16	December 24	Chicago Bears	**W** 26–0	14–2	Candlestick Park	60,207	Recap
Note: Intra-division opponents are in **bold** text.

=== Season summary ===
==== Week 1 at Indianapolis Colts ====
Week One: San Francisco 49ers at Indianapolis Colts – Game summary

Quarter	1	2	3	4	Total
**49ers**	3	10	10	7	**30**
Colts	3	7	0	14	**24**

at Hoosier Dome, Indianapolis

- Date: September 10
- Game time: 10:00 a.m. PDT
- Game weather: indoors
- Game attendance: 60,111
- Referee: Tom Dooley
- TV announcers (CBS): Tim Brant (play-by-play), Dan Jiggetts (color commentator)
- Pro-Football-Reference.com

Game information

**First quarter**

- SF – Mike Cofer 38 yard field goal – **49ers 3–0**
- IND – Dean Biasucci 31 yard field goal – **Tied 3–3**

**Second quarter**

- SF – Roger Craig 1 yard rush – (Mike Cofer kick) **49ers 10–3**
- IND – Bill Brooks 22 yard pass from Chris Chandler – (Dean Biasucci kick) **Tied 10–10**
- SF – Mike Cofer 26 yard field goal – **49ers 13–10**

**Third quarter**

- SF – Roger Craig 4 yard rush – (Mike Cofer kick) **49ers 20–10**
- SF – Mike Cofer 31 yard field goal – **49ers 23–10**

**Fourth quarter**

- IND – Chris Chandler 1 yard rush – (Dean Biasucci kick) **49ers 23–17**
- SF – Jerry Rice 58 yard pass from Joe Montana – (Mike Cofer kick) **49ers 30–17**
- IND – Albert Bentley 0 yard punt return – (Dean Biasucci kick) **49ers 30–24**

**Top passers**

- SF – Joe Montana, 15/26, 233 Yds, 1 TD
- IND – Chris Chandler, 14/32, 200 Yds, 1 TD, 1 Int

**Top rushers**

- SF – Roger Craig, 24 Car, 131 Yds, 2 TDs
- IND – Eric Dickerson, 19 Car, 106 Yds

**Top receivers**

- SF – Jerry Rice, 6 Rec, 163 Yds, 1 TD
- IND – Bill Brooks, 4 Rec, 80 Yds, 1 TD

**Top tacklers**

- SF -
- IND -

**Turnovers**

- SF – 0
- IND – 1

Week One proved to be a struggle for the Niners as Joe Montana led five scoring drives, putting the Niners ahead by 23–10 entering the fourth quarter, but then Colts QB Chris Chandler ran in a touchdown early in the fourth quarter, and a 58-yard touchdown bomb to Jerry Rice was answered by a blocked punt and recovery for a touchdown by the Colts, though they could get no closer than a 30–24 Niners margin.

==== Week 2 at Tampa Bay Buccaneers ====
Week Two: San Francisco 49ers at Tampa Bay Buccaneers – Game summary

Quarter	1	2	3	4	Total
**49ers**	0	6	0	14	**20**
Buccaneers	3	0	6	7	**16**

at Tampa Stadium, Tampa, Florida

- Date: September 17
- Game time: 1:00 p.m. PDT
- Game weather: 82 °F (27.8 °C); wind 6 miles per hour (9.7 km/h; 5.2 kn)
- Game attendance: 64,087
- Referee: Gordon McCarter
- TV announcers (CBS): Dick Stockton (play-by-play), Dan Fouts (color commentator)
- Pro-Football-Reference.com

Game information

**First quarter**

- TB – Donald Igwebuike 23 yard field goal – **Buccaneers 3–0**

**Second quarter**

- SF – Mike Cofer 47 yard field goal – **Tied 3–3**
- SF – Mike Cofer 32 yard field goal – **49ers 6–3**

**Third quarter**

- TB – Donald Igwebuike 44 yard field goal – **Tied 6–6**
- TB – Donald Igwebuike 37 yard field goal – **Buccaneers 9–6**

**Fourth quarter**

- SF – Jerry Rice 2 yard pass from Joe Montana – (Mike Cofer kick) **49ers 13–9**
- TB – Mark Carrier 18 yard pass from Vinny Testaverde – (Donald Igwebuike kick) **Buccaneers 16–13**
- SF – Joe Montana 4 yard rush – (Mike Cofer kick) **49ers 20–16**

**Top passers**

- SF – Joe Montana, 25/39, 266 Yds, 1 TD, 2 Ints
- TB – Vinny Testaverde, 14/35, 146 Yds, 1 TD, 2 Ints

**Top rushers**

- SF – Roger Craig, 16 Car, 36 Yds
- TB – William Howard, 12 Car, 41 Yds

**Top receivers**

- SF – Jerry Rice, 8 Rec, 122 Yds, 1 TD
- TB – Mark Carrier, 5 Rec, 86 Yds, 1 TD

**Top tacklers**

- SF -
- TB -

**Turnovers**

- SF – 3
- TB – 3

==== Week 3 at Philadelphia Eagles ====
Week Three: San Francisco 49ers at Philadelphia Eagles – Game summary

Quarter	1	2	3	4	Total
**49ers**	7	3	0	28	**38**
Eagles	9	3	6	10	**28**

at Veterans Stadium, Philadelphia

- Date: September 24
- Game time: 10:00 a.m. PDT
- Game weather: 52 °F (11.1 °C); wind 10 miles per hour (16 km/h; 8.7 kn)
- Game attendance: 66,042
- Referee: Dick Jorgensen
- TV announcers (CBS): Verne Lundquist (play-by-play), Terry Bradshaw (color commentator)
- Pro-Football-Reference.com

Game information

**First quarter**

- SF – Jerry Rice 68 yard pass from Joe Montana – (Mike Cofer kick) **49ers 7–0**
- PHI – Heath Sherman 2 yard rush – (Luis Zendejas kick) **Tied 7–7**
- PHI – Safety, Al Harris tackled Joe Montana in end zone – **Eagles 9–7**

**Second quarter**

- PHI – Luis Zendejas 35 yard field goal – **Eagles 12–7**
- SF – Mike Cofer 32 yard field goal – **Eagles 12–10**

**Third quarter**

- PHI – Luis Zendejas 35 yard field goal – **Eagles 15–10**
- PHI – Luis Zendejas 44 yard field goal – **Eagles 18–10**

**Fourth quarter**

- PHI – Luis Zendejas 20 yard field goal – **Eagles 21–10**
- SF – John Taylor 70 yard pass from Joe Montana – (Mike Cofer kick) **Eagles 21–17**
- PHI – Jimmie Giles 3 yard pass from Randall Cunningham – (Luis Zendejas kick) **Eagles 28–17**
- SF – Tom Rathman 8 yard pass from Joe Montana – (Mike Cofer kick) **Eagles 28–24**
- SF – Brent Jones 25 yard pass from Joe Montana – (Mike Cofer kick) **49ers 31–28**
- SF – Jerry Rice 33 yard pass from Joe Montana – (Mike Cofer kick) **49ers 38–28**

**Top passers**

- SF – Joe Montana, 25/34, 428 Yds, 5 TDs, 1 Int
- PHI – Randall Cunningham, 19/38, 192 Yds, 1 TD, 1 Int

**Top rushers**

- SF – Harry Sydney, 4 Car, 30 Yds
- PHI – Randall Cunningham, 8 Car, 52 Yds

**Top receivers**

- SF – Jerry Rice, 6 Rec, 164 Yds, 2 TDs
- PHI – Heath Sherman, 4 Rec, 53 Yds

**Top tacklers**

- SF -
- PHI -

**Turnovers**

- SF – 3
- PHI – 3

The Niners fell behind 21–10 in the fourth but despite giving up a safety Joe Montana erupted, outscoring the Eagles 28–7 and throwing for 428 yards and five touchdowns in total, winning 38–28.

==== Week 4 vs. Los Angeles Rams ====
Week Four: Los Angeles Rams at San Francisco 49ers – Game summary

Quarter	1	2	3	4	Total
**Rams**	3	7	0	3	**13**
49ers	6	3	0	3	**12**

at Candlestick Park, San Francisco, California

- Date: October 1
- Game time: 1:00 p.m. PDT
- Game weather: 69 °F or 20.6 °C (Sunny); wind 15 miles per hour (24 km/h; 13 kn)
- Game attendance: 64,250
- Referee: Jerry Seeman
- TV announcers (CBS): Dick Stockton (play-by-play), Dan Fouts (color commentator)
- Pro-Football-Reference.com

Game information

**First quarter**

- SF – Mike Cofer 26 yard field goal – **49ers 3–0**
- LARams – Mike Lansford 40 yard field goal – **Tied 3–3**
- SF – Mike Cofer 32 yard field goal – **49ers 6–3**

**Second quarter**

- LARams – Flipper Anderson 65 yard pass from Jim Everett – (Mike Lansford kick) **Rams 10–6**
- SF – Mike Cofer 41 yard field goal – **Rams 10–9**

**Third quarter**

- No scoring plays

**Fourth quarter**

- SF – Mike Cofer 17 yard field goal – **49ers 12–10**
- LARams – Mike Lansford 26 yard field goal – **Rams 13–12**

**Top passers**

- LARams – Jim Everett, 16/25, 250 Yds, 1 TD
- SF – Joe Montana, 25/35, 227 Yds

**Top rushers**

- LARams – Greg Bell, 14 Car, 33 Yds
- SF – Roger Craig, 18 Car, 67 Yds

**Top receivers**

- LARams – Henry Ellard, 5 Rec, 63 Yds
- SF – Brent Jones, 5 Rec, 51 Yds

**Top tacklers**

- LARams -
- SF -

**Turnovers**

- LARams – 0
- SF – 1

==== Week 5 at New Orleans Saints ====
This game was originally scheduled for Candlestick Park but was played at the Louisiana Superdome instead because the 49ers' fellow Candlestick Park tenant, the San Francisco Giants, played host to Games 3, 4, and 5 of the 1989 National League Championship Series. The November 6 game would be moved to San Francisco.

Week Five: San Francisco 49ers at New Orleans Saints – Game summary

Quarter	1	2	3	4	Total
**49ers**	0	3	7	14	**24**
Saints	0	10	7	3	**20**

at Louisiana Superdome, New Orleans, Louisiana

- Date: October 8
- Game time: 1:00 p.m. PDT
- Game weather: indoors
- Game attendance: 60,488
- Referee: Red Cashion
- TV announcers (CBS): Verne Lundquist (play-by-play), Terry Bradshaw (color commentator)
- Pro-Football-Reference.com

Game information

**First quarter**

- No scoring plays

**Second quarter**

- SF – Mike Cofer 41 yard field goal – **49ers 3–0**
- NO – Hoby Brenner 2 yard pass from Bobby Hebert – (Morten Andersen kick) **Saints 7–3**
- NO – Morten Andersen 49 yard field goal – **Saints 10–3**

**Third quarter**

- NO – Dalton Hilliard 19 yard pass from Bobby Hebert – (Morten Andersen kick) **Saints 17–3**
- SF – Jerry Rice 60 yard pass from Joe Montana – (Mike Cofer kick) **Saints 17–10**

**Fourth quarter**

- SF – John Taylor 21 yard pass from Joe Montana – (Mike Cofer kick) **Tied 17–17**
- NO – Morten Andersen 39 yard field goal – **Saints 20–17**
- SF – John Taylor 32 yard pass from Joe Montana – (Mike Cofer kick) **49ers 24–20**

**Top passers**

- SF – Joe Montana, 21/29, 291 Yds, 3 TDs
- NO – Bobby Hebert, 31/49, 308 Yds, 2 TDs

**Top rushers**

- SF – Roger Craig, 18 Car, 70 Yds
- NO – Craig Heyward, 4 Car, 21 Yds

**Top receivers**

- SF – Jerry Rice, 7 Rec, 149 Yds, 1 TD
- NO – Dalton Hilliard, 9 Rec, 77 yds, 1 TD

**Top tacklers**

- SF -
- NO -

**Turnovers**

- SF – 1
- NO – 0

==== Week 6 at Dallas Cowboys ====
Week Six: San Francisco 49ers at Dallas Cowboys – Game summary

Quarter	1	2	3	4	Total
**49ers**	0	7	7	17	**31**
Cowboys	0	7	7	0	**14**

at Texas Stadium, Irving, Texas

- Date: October 15
- Game time: 10:00 a.m. PDT
- Game weather: 76 °F (24.4 °C); wind 12 miles per hour (19 km/h; 10 kn)
- Game attendance: 61,077
- Referee: Ben Dreith
- TV announcers (CBS): Tim Brant (play-by-play), Dan Jiggetts (color commentator)
- Pro-Football-Reference.com

Game information

**First quarter**

- No scoring plays

**Second quarter**

- SF – Brent Jones 36 yard pass from Steve Young – (Mike Cofer kick) **49ers 7–0**
- DAL – Kelvin Martin 32 yard pass from Steve Walsh – (Roger Ruzek kick) **Tied 7–7**

**Third quarter**

- SF – Johnnie Jackson 75 yard blocked field goal return – (Mike Cofer kick) **49ers 14–7**
- DAL – Darryl Clack 1 yard rush – (Roger Ruzek kick) **Tied 14–14**

**Fourth quarter**

- SF – Jerry Rice 8 yard pass from Steve Young – (Mike Cofer kick) **49ers 21–14**
- SF – Mike Cofer 31 yard field goal – **49ers 24–14**
- SF – Roger Craig 1 yard rush – (Mike Cofer kick) **49ers 31–14**

**Top passers**

- SF – Steve Young, 13/18, 174 Yds, 2 TDs, 1 Int
- DAL – Steve Walsh, 23/36, 294 Yds, 1 TD, 2 Ints

**Top rushers**

- SF – Steve Young, 11 Car, 79 Yds
- DAL – Darryl Clack, 12 Car, 32 Yds, 1 TD

**Top receivers**

- SF – Tom Rathman, 5 Rec, 64 Yds
- DAL – Michael Irvin, 6 Rec, 60 Yds

**Top tacklers**

- SF -
- DAL -

**Turnovers**

- SF – 1
- DAL – 3

==== Week 7 vs. New England Patriots ====
This game was played at Stanford Stadium, as Candlestick Park had sustained damage in the Loma Prieta earthquake five days earlier.

Week Seven: New England Patriots at San Francisco 49ers – Game summary

Quarter	1	2	3	4	Total
Patriots	0	10	7	3	**20**
**49ers**	0	17	7	13	**37**

at Stanford Stadium, Stanford, California

- Date: October 22
- Game time: 1:00 p.m. PDT
- Game weather: 63 °F (17.2 °C); wind 16 miles per hour (26 km/h; 14 kn)
- Game attendance: 51,781
- Referee: Howard Roe
- TV announcers (NBC): Dick Enberg (play-by-play), Bill Walsh (color commentator)
- Pro-Football-Reference.com

Game information

**First quarter**

- No scoring plays

**Second quarter**

- NE – Stanley Morgan 55 yard pass from Steve Grogan – (Greg Davis kick) – **Patriots 7–0**
- SF – Jerry Rice 3 yard pass from Joe Montana – (Mike Cofer kick) **Tied 7–7**
- SF – Mike Cofer 23 yard field goal – **49ers 10–7**
- NE – Greg Davis 49 yard field goal – **Tied 10–10**
- SF – Wesley Walls 1 yard pass from Steve Young – (Mike Cofer kick) **49ers 17–10**

**Third quarter**

- NE – Stanley Morgan 19 yard pass from Steve Grogan – (Greg Davis kick) – **Tied 17–17**
- SF – Jerry Rice 50 yard pass from Steve Young – (Mike Cofer kick) **49ers 24–17**

**Fourth quarter**

- NE – Greg Davis 21 yard field goal – **49ers 24–20**
- SF – John Taylor 43 yard pass from Steve Young – (Mike Cofer kick) **49ers 31–20**
- SF – Roger Craig 3 yard run – (kick failed) **49ers 37–20**

**Top passers**

- NE – Steve Grogan, 15/29, 240 Yds, 2 TDs, 2 Ints
- SF – Steve Young, 11/12, 188 Yds, 3 TDs

**Top rushers**

- NE – John Stephens, 21 Car, 63 Yds
- SF – Roger Craig, 22 Car, 66 Yds, 1 TD

**Top receivers**

- NE – Irving Fryar, 5 Rec, 102 Yds
- SF – Tom Rathman, 11 Rec, 103 Yds

**Top tacklers**

- NE -
- SF -

**Turnovers**

- NE – 2
- SF – 0

==== Week 8 at New York Jets ====
Week Eight: San Francisco 49ers at New York Jets – Game summary

Quarter	1	2	3	4	Total
**49ers**	7	13	3	0	**23**
Jets	0	7	3	0	**10**

at Giants Stadium, East Rutherford, New Jersey

- Date: October 29
- Game time: 1:00 p.m. PST
- Game weather: 64 °F (17.8 °C); wind 6 miles per hour (9.7 km/h; 5.2 kn)
- Game attendance: 62,805
- Referee: Fred Wyant
- TV announcers (CBS): Dick Stockton (play-by-play), Dan Fouts (color commentator)
- Pro-Football-Reference.com

Game information

**First quarter**

- SF – Brent Jones 10 yard pass from Steve Young – (Mike Cofer kick) **49ers 7–0**

**Second quarter**

- NYJ – Erik McMillan 45 yard fumble return – (Pat Leahy kick) **Tied 7–7**
- SF – Jerry Rice 45 yard pass from Steve Bono – (Mike Cofer kick) **49ers 14–7**
- SF – Mike Cofer 25 yard field goal – **49ers 17–7**
- SF – Mike Cofer 41 yard field goal – **49ers 20–7**

**Third quarter**

- NYJ – Pat Leahy 34 yard field goal – **49ers 20–10**
- SF – Mike Cofer 40 yard field goal – **49ers 23–10**

**Fourth quarter**

- No scoring plays

**Top passers**

- SF – Steve Young, 13/20, 182 Yds, 1 TD
- NYJ – Ken O'Brien, 25/36, 203 Yds

**Top rushers**

- SF – Roger Craig, 17 Car, 78 Yds
- NYJ – Johnny Hector, 13 Car, 77 Yds

**Top receivers**

- SF – Roger Craig, 6 Rec, 85 Yds
- NYJ – Keith Neubert, 4 Rec, 40 Yds

**Top tacklers**

- SF -
- NYJ -

**Turnovers**

- SF – 1
- NYJ – 2

==== Week 9 vs. New Orleans Saints ====
This game was originally scheduled for Louisiana Superdome, but was played at Candlestick Park instead, because the originally scheduled October 8 game at Candlestick Park had been moved to the Louisiana Superdome.

Week Nine: New Orleans Saints at San Francisco 49ers – Game summary

Quarter	1	2	3	4	Total
Saints	7	3	3	0	**13**
**49ers**	7	14	3	7	**31**

at Candlestick Park, San Francisco, California

- Date: November 6
- Game time: 6:00 p.m. PST
- Game weather: 54 °F or 12.2 °C (Clear); wind 11 miles per hour (18 km/h; 9.6 kn)
- Game attendance: 60,667
- Referee: Jim Tunney
- TV announcers (ABC): Al Michaels (play-by-play), Dan Dierdorf and Frank Gifford (color commentators)
- Pro-Football-Reference.com

Game information

**First quarter**

- SF – Jerry Rice 32 yard pass from Joe Montana – (Mike Cofer kick) **49ers 7–0**
- NO – Dalton Hilliard 1 yard rush – (Morten Andersen kick) **Tied 7–7**

**Second quarter**

- SF – Jerry Rice 2 yard pass from Joe Montana – (Mike Cofer kick) **49ers 14–7**
- NO – Morten Andersen 39 yard field goal – **49ers 14–10**
- SF – John Taylor 46 yard pass from Joe Montana – (Mike Cofer kick) **49ers 21–10**

**Third quarter**

- NO – Morten Andersen 23 yard field goal – **49ers 21–13**
- SF – Mike Cofer 44 yard field goal – **49ers 24–13**

**Fourth quarter**

- SF – Joe Montana 3 yard rush – (Mike Cofer kick) **49ers 31–13**

**Top passers**

- NO – Bobby Hebert, 20/33, 183 Yds, 2 Ints
- SF – Joe Montana, 22/31, 302 Yds, 3 TDs

**Top rushers**

- NO – Dalton Hilliard, 18 Car, 80 Yds, 1 TD
- SF – Roger Craig, 17 Car, 51 Yds

**Top receivers**

- NO – Dalton Hilliard, 5 Rec, 31 Yds
- SF – Tom Rathman, 7 Rec, 64 Yds

**Top tacklers**

- NO -
- SF -

**Turnovers**

- N0 – 2
- SF – 0

==== Week 10 vs. Atlanta Falcons ====
Week Ten: Atlanta Falcons at San Francisco 49ers – Game summary

Quarter	1	2	3	4	Total
Falcons	0	3	0	0	**3**
**49ers**	7	21	10	7	**45**

at Candlestick Park, San Francisco, California

- Date: November 12
- Game time: 1:00 p.m. PST
- Game weather: 59 °F or 15 °C (Mostly Cloudy); wind 14 miles per hour (23 km/h; 12 kn)
- Game attendance: 59,914
- Referee: Jerry Seeman
- TV announcers (CBS): Tim Brant (play-by-play), Dan Jiggetts (color commentator)
- Pro-Football-Reference.com

Game information

**First quarter**

- SF – Joe Montana 1 yard rush – (Mike Cofer kick) **49ers 7–0**

**Second quarter**

- ATL – Chris Miller 23 yard field goal – **49ers 7–3**
- SF – Jerry Rice 38 yard pass from Joe Montana – (Mike Cofer kick) **49ers 14–3**
- SF – Charles Haley 3 yard fumble return – (Mike Cofer kick) **49ers 21–3**
- SF – John Taylor 2 yard pass from Joe Montana – (Mike Cofer kick) **49ers 28–3**

**Third quarter**

- SF – Jerry Rice 11 yard pass from Joe Montana – (Mike Cofer kick) **49ers 35–3**
- SF – Mike Cofer 18 yard field goal – **49ers 38–3**

**Fourth quarter**

- SF – Keith Henderson 11 yard rush – (Mike Cofer kick) **49ers 45–3**

**Top passers**

- ATL – Chris Miller, 17/32, 149 Yds
- SF – Joe Montana, 16/19, 270 Yds, 3 TDs

**Top rushers**

- ATL – John Settle, 8 Car, 31 Yds
- SF – Roger Craig, 17 Car, 109 Yds

**Top receivers**

- ATL – Floyd Dixon, 4 Rec, 48 Yds
- SF – Tom Rathman, 6 Rec, 43 Yds

**Top tacklers**

- ATL -
- SF -

**Turnovers**

- ATL – 1
- SF – 2

==== Week 11 vs. Green Bay Packers ====
Week Eleven: Green Bay Packers at San Francisco 49ers – Game summary

Quarter	1	2	3	4	Total
**Packers**	7	7	0	7	**21**
49ers	7	7	0	3	**17**

at Candlestick Park, San Francisco, California

- Date: November 19
- Game time: 1:00 p.m. PST
- Game weather: 72 °F or 22.2 °C (Sunny); wind 4 miles per hour (6.4 km/h; 3.5 kn)
- Game attendance: 62,219
- Referee: Dick Hantak
- TV announcers (CBS): Dick Stockton (play-by-play), Dan Fouts (color commentator)
- Pro-Football-Reference.com

Game information

**First quarter**

- GB – Don Majkowski 2 yard rush – (Chris Jacke kick) **Packers 7–0**
- SF – Roger Craig 4 yard pass from Joe Montana – (Mike Cofer kick) **Tied 7–7**

**Second quarter**

- GB – Sterling Sharpe 4 yard pass from Don Majkowski – (Chris Jacke kick) **Packers 14–7**
- SF – Jerry Rice 9 yard pass from Joe Montana – (Mike Cofer kick) **Tied 14–14**

**Third quarter**

- No scoring plays

**Fourth quarter**

- GB – Don Majkowski 8 yard rush – (Chris Jacke kick) **Packers 21–14**
- SF – Mike Cofer 44 yard field goal – **Packers 21–17**

**Top passers**

- GB – Don Majkowski, 18/30, 153 Yds, 1 TD
- SF – Joe Montana, 30/42, 325 Yds, 2 TDs, 1 Int

**Top rushers**

- GB – Brent Fullwood, 16 Car, 76 Yds
- SF – Roger Craig, 8 Car, 41 Yds

**Top receivers**

- GB – Sterling Sharpe, 6 Rec, 59 Yds, 1 TD
- SF – Jerry Rice, 9 Rec, 106 Yds, 1 TD

**Top tacklers**

- GB -
- SF -

**Turnovers**

- GB – 1
- SF – 4

The Niners fell to the Green Bay Packers in what would be their final loss of the season, as Don Majkowski ran in two touchdowns and threw for a third, overcoming 325 yards by Joe Montana, who was sacked five times. The 49ers appeared to take the lead in the 4th quarter on an interception return for a touchdown, but a penalty nullified the score.

==== Week 12 vs. New York Giants ====
Week Twelve: New York Giants at San Francisco 49ers – Game summary

Quarter	1	2	3	4	Total
Giants	7	3	7	7	**24**
**49ers**	14	10	0	10	**34**

at Candlestick Park, San Francisco, California

- Date: November 27
- Game time: 6:00 p.m. PST
- Game weather: 54 °F or 12.2 °C (Clear); wind 12 miles per hour (19 km/h; 10 kn)
- Game attendance: 63,461
- Referee: Bob McElwee
- TV announcers (ABC): Al Michaels (play-by-play), Dan Dierdorf and Frank Gifford (color commentators)
- Pro-Football-Reference.com

Game information

**First quarter**

- SF – John Taylor 4 yard pass from Joe Montana – (Mike Cofer kick) **49ers 7–0**
- NYG – Ottis Anderson 2 yard rush – (Bjorn Nittomo kick) **Tied 7–7**
- SF – Jerry Rice 4 yard pass from Joe Montana – (Mike Cofer kick) **49ers 14–7**

**Second quarter**

- SF – Mike Cofer 44 yard field goal – **49ers 17–7**
- SF – Brent Jones 17 yard pass from Joe Montana – (Mike Cofer kick) **49ers 24–7**
- NYG – Bjorn Nittomo 39 yard field goal – **49ers 24–10**

**Third quarter**

- NYG – Dave Meggett 53 yard pass from Phil Simms – (Bjorn Nittomo kick) **49ers 24–17**

**Fourth quarter**

- NYG – Odessa Turner 7 yard pass from Phil Simms – (Bjorn Nittomo kick) **Tied 24–24**
- SF – Mike Cofer 45 yard field goal – **49ers 27–24**
- SF – Tom Rathman 1 yard rush – (Mike Cofer **49ers 34–24**

**Top passers**

- NYG – Phil Simms, 25/48, 326 Yds, 2 TDs, 3 Ints
- SF – Joe Montana, 27/33, 292 Yds, 3 TDs

**Top rushers**

- NYG – Dave Meggett, 5 Car, 29 Yds
- SF – Roger Craig, 20 Car, 49 Yds

**Top receivers**

- NYG – Zeke Mowatt, 5 Rec, 62 Yds
- SF – Jerry Rice, 7 Rec, 117 Yds, 1 TD

**Top tacklers**

- NYG -
- SF -

**Turnovers**

- NYG – 5
- SF – 3

==== Week 13 at Atlanta Falcons ====
Week Thirteen: San Francisco 49ers at Atlanta Falcons – Game summary

Quarter	1	2	3	4	Total
**49ers**	6	0	7	10	**23**
Falcons	0	10	0	0	**10**

at Atlanta–Fulton County Stadium, Atlanta

- Date: December 3
- Game time: 10:00 a.m. PST
- Game weather: 39 °F (3.9 °C); wind 8 miles per hour (13 km/h; 7.0 kn), wind chill 30 °F or −1.1 °C
- Game attendance: 43,128
- Referee: Gene Barth
- TV announcers (CBS): James Brown (play-by-play), Ken Stabler (color commentator)
- Pro-Football-Reference.com

Game information

**First quarter**

- SF – Mike Cofer 35 yard field goal – **49ers 3–0**
- SF – Mike Cofer 23 yard field goal – **49ers 6–0**

**Second quarter**

- ATL – Greg Davis 46 yard field goal – **49ers 6–3**
- ATL – Ron Heller 28 yard pass from Chris Miller – (Greg Davis kick) **Falcons 10–6**

**Third quarter**

- SF – John Taylor 38 yard pass from Steve Young – (Mike Cofer kick) **49ers 13–10**

**Fourth quarter**

- SF – Steve Young 1 yard rush – (Mike Cofer kick) **49ers 20–10**
- SF – Mike Cofer 27 yard field goal – **49ers 23–10**

**Top passers**

- SF – Steve Young, 11/12, 175 Yds, 1 TD
- ATL – Chris Miller, 17/32, 231 Yds, 1 TD, 2 Ints

**Top rushers**

- SF – Roger Craig, 17 Car, 97 Yds
- ATL – John Settle, 10 Car, 15 Yds

**Top receivers**

- SF – John Taylor, 5 Rec, 162 Yds, 1 TD
- ATL – Shawn Collins, 5 Rec, 71 Yds

**Top tacklers**

- SF -
- ATL -

**Turnovers**

- SF – 1
- ATL – 2

==== Week 14 at Los Angeles Rams ====
Week Fourteen: San Francisco 49ers at Los Angeles Rams – Game summary

Quarter	1	2	3	4	Total
**49ers**	0	10	0	20	**30**
Rams	17	0	7	3	**27**

at Anaheim Stadium, Anaheim, California

- Date: December 11
- Game time: 6:00 p.m. PST
- Game weather: 56 °F (13.3 °C); wind 8 miles per hour (13 km/h; 7.0 kn)
- Game attendance: 67,959
- Referee: Gordon McCarter
- TV announcers (ABC): Al Michaels (play-by-play), Dan Dierdorf and Frank Gifford (color commentators)
- Pro-Football-Reference.com

Game information

**First quarter**

- LARams – Greg Bell 3 yard rush – (Mike Lansford kick) **Rams 7–0**
- LARams – Damone Johnson 4 yard pass from Jim Everett – (Mike Lansford kick) **Rams 14–0**
- LARams – Mike Lansford 25 yard field goal – **Rams 17–0**

**Second quarter**

- SF – Mike Cofer 19 yard field goal – **Rams 17–3**
- SF – John Taylor 92 yard pass from Joe Montana – (Mike Cofer kick) **Rams 17–10**

**Third quarter**

- LARams – Buford McGee 13 yard pass from Jim Everett – (Mike Lansford kick) **Rams 24–10**

**Fourth quarter**

- LARams – Mike Lansford 22 yard field goal – **Rams 27–10**
- SF – Mike Wilson 7 yard pass from Joe Montana – (Mike Cofer kick) **Rams 27–17**
- SF – John Taylor 96 yard pass from Joe Montana – (kick failed) **Rams 27–23**
- SF – Roger Craig 1 yard rush – (Mike Cofer kick) **49ers 30–27**

**Top passers**

- SF – Joe Montana, 30/42, 458 Yds, 3 TDs, 2 Ints
- LARams – Jim Everett, 18/31, 239 Yds, 2 TDs

**Top rushers**

- SF – Roger Craig, 16 Car, 48 Yds, 1 TD
- LARams – Greg Bell, 14 Car, 48 Yds, 1 TD

**Top receivers**

- SF – John Taylor, 11 Rec, 286 Yds, 2 TDs
- LARams – Aaaron Cox, 3 Rec, 34 Yds

**Top tacklers**

- SF -
- LARams -

**Turnovers**

- SF – 2
- LARams – 2

In what many 49ers fans consider one of the greatest regular-season wins in team history, the 49ers came back from a 27–10 4th-quarter deficit to beat the Rams 30–27. The Rams had already beaten the 49ers earlier in the year and looked poised to do it again, but the 49ers, with help from John Taylor's big game, took the lead late with Roger Craig's 1-yard touchdown. John Taylor had 11 catches for an astonishing 286 yards receiving, which included a touchdown catch of 92 yards, and another touchdown catch for 96 yards. Joe Montana was 30 for 42 and passed for 458 yards.

==== Week 15 vs. Buffalo Bills ====
Week Fifteen: Buffalo Bills at San Francisco 49ers – Game summary

Quarter	1	2	3	4	Total
Bills	3	0	0	7	**10**
**49ers**	0	0	7	14	**21**

at Candlestick Park, San Francisco, California

- Date: December 17
- Game time: 1:00 p.m. PST
- Game weather: 47 °F (8.3 °C); wind 8 miles per hour (13 km/h; 7.0 kn)
- Game attendance: 60,927
- Referee: Johnny Grier
- TV announcers (NBC): Dick Enberg (play-by-play), Bill Walsh (color commentator)
- Pro-Football-Reference.com

Game information

**First quarter**

- BUF – Scott Norwood 23 yard field goal – **Bills 3–0**

**Second quarter**

- No scoring plays

**Third quarter**

- SF – Roger Craig 1 yard rush – (Mike Cofer kick) **49ers 7–3**

**Fourth quarter**

- SF – Steve Young 2 yard rush – (Mike Cofer kick) **49ers 14–3**
- SF – Jerry Rice 8 yard pass from Steve Young – (Mike Cofer kick) **49ers 21–3**
- BUF – Jim Kelly 1 yard rush – (Scott Norwood kick) **49ers 21–10**

**Top passers**

- BUF – Jim Kelly, 26/42, 265 Yds, 3 Ints
- SF – Steve Young, 9/19, 166 Yds, 1 TD, 2 Ints

**Top rushers**

- BUF – Larry Kinnebrew, 8 Car, 29 Yds
- SF – Roger Craig, 25 Car, 105 Yds, 1 TD

**Top receivers**

- BUF – Andre Reed, 10 Rec, 115 Yds
- SF – Jerry Rice, 3 Rec, 46 Yds, 1 TD

**Top tacklers**

- BUF -
- SF -

**Turnovers**

- BUF – 5
- SF – 2

==== Week 16 vs. Chicago Bears ====
Week Sixteen: Chicago Bears at San Francisco 49ers – Game summary

Quarter	1	2	3	4	Total
Bears	0	0	0	0	**0**
**49ers**	3	13	3	7	**26**

at Candlestick Park, San Francisco, California

- Date: December 24
- Game time: 1:00 p.m. PST
- Game weather: 46 °F (7.8 °C); wind 8 miles per hour (13 km/h; 7.0 kn)
- Game attendance: 60,207
- Referee: Jim Tunney
- TV announcers (CBS): Pat Summerall (play-by-play), John Madden (color commentator)
- Pro-Football-Reference.com

Game information

**First quarter**

- SF – Mike Cofer 29 yard field goal – **49ers 3–0**

**Second quarter**

- SF – Mike Cofer 24 yard field goal – **49ers 6–0**
- SF – Jerry Rice 29 yard pass from Joe Montana – (Mike Cofer kick) **49ers 13–0**
- SF – Mike Cofer 36 yard field goal – **49ers 16–0**

**Third quarter**

- SF – Mike Cofer 47 yard field goal – **49ers 19–0**

**Fourth quarter**

- SF – Terrence Flagler 29 yard rush – (Mike Cofer kick) **49ers 26–0**

**Top passers**

- CHI – Mike Tomczak, 14/30, 147 Yds, 2 Ints
- SF – Joe Montana, 10/21, 106 Yds, 1 TD, 1 Int

**Top rushers**

- CHI – Jim Harbaugh, 7 Car, 44 Yds
- SF – Terrence Flagler, 8 Car, 41 Yds, 1 TD

**Top receivers**

- CHI – Dennis McKinnon, 3 Rec, 43 Yds
- SF – Jerry Rice, 4 Rec, 101 Yds, 1 TD

**Top tacklers**

- CHI -
- SF -

**Turnovers**

- CHI – 5
- SF – 1

=== Standings ===
NFC West
	W	L	T	PCT	DIV	CONF	PF	PA	STK
^{(1)} San Francisco 49ers	14	2	0	.875	5–1	10–2	442	253	W5
^{(5)} Los Angeles Rams	11	5	0	.688	4–2	8–4	426	344	W2
New Orleans Saints	9	7	0	.563	3–3	5–7	386	301	W3
Atlanta Falcons	3	13	0	.188	0–6	1–11	279	437	L7

== Playoffs ==
Round	Date	Opponent (seed)	Result	Record	Venue	Attendance	Recap
Wild Card	First-round bye						
Divisional	January 6, 1990	Minnesota Vikings (3)	W 41–13	1–0	Candlestick Park	64,585	Recap
NFC Championship	January 14, 1990	Los Angeles Rams (5)	W 30–3	2–0	Candlestick Park	64,769	Recap
Super Bowl XXIV	January 28, 1990	vs. Denver Broncos (A1)	W 55–10	3–0	Louisiana Superdome	72,919	Recap

=== NFC Divisional Playoffs: vs. (3) Minnesota Vikings ===
NFC Divisional Playoff: Minnesota Vikings at San Francisco 49ers – Game summary

Quarter	1	2	3	4	Total
Vikings	3	0	3	7	13
49ers	7	20	0	14	41

at Candlestick Park, San Francisco

- Date: January 6, 1990 (Sat)
- Game time: 1:00 p.m. PST
- Game weather: 48 °F (9 °C); wind 8
- Game attendance: 64,585
- Referee: Tom Dooley
- TV announcers (CBS): Verne Lundquist (play-by-play), Terry Bradshaw (color commentator), Irv Cross (sideline reporter)
- Pro-Football-Reference.com

Game information

First quarter

- MIN – Rich Karlis 38 yard field goal – Vikings 3–0
- SF – Jerry Rice 72 yard pass from Joe Montana – (Mike Cofer kick) 49ers 7–3

Second quarter

- SF – Brent Jones 8 yard pass from Joe Montana – (Mike Cofer kick) 49ers 14–3
- SF – John Taylor 8 yard pass from Joe Montana – (kick failed) 49ers 20–3
- SF – Jerry Rice 13 yard pass from Joe Montana – (Mike Cofer kick) 49ers 27–3

Third quarter

- MIN – Rich Karlis 44 yard field goal – 49ers 27–6

Fourth Quarter

- SF – Ronnie Lott 58 yard interception return – (Mike Cofer kick) 49ers 34–6
- SF – Roger Craig 4 yard rush – Mike Cofer kick) 49ers 41–6
- MIN – Rick Fenney 3 yard rush – (Rich Karlis kick) 49ers 41–13

Top passers

- MIN – Rich Gannon, 13/18, 144 Yds, 1 Int
- SF – Joe Montana, 17/24, 241 Yds, 4 TD

Top rushers

- MIN – Herschel Walker, 9 Car, 29 Yds
- SF – Roger Craig, 18 Car, 125 Yds, 1 TD

Top receivers

- MIN – Steve Jordan, 9 Rec, 149 Yds
- SF – Jerry Rice, 6 Rec, 114 Yds, 2 TDs

Top tacklers

- MIN -
- SF -

Turnovers

- MIN – 5
- SF – 1

=== NFC Championship: vs. (5) Los Angeles Rams ===
NFC Championship Game: Los Angeles Rams at San Francisco 49ers – Game summary

Quarter	1	2	3	4	Total
Rams	3	0	0	0	3
49ers	0	21	3	6	30

at Candlestick Park, San Francisco, California

- Date: January 14, 1990
- Game time: 2:00 p.m. PST
- Game weather: 52 °F (11 °C); wind 14
- Game attendance: 64,769
- Referee: Jerry Markbreit
- TV announcers (CBS): Pat Summerall (play-by-play), John Madden (color commentator), Randy Cross (sideline reporter)
- Pro-Football-Reference.com

Game information

First quarter

- LARams – Mike Lansford 23 yard field goal Rams 3–0

Second quarter

- SF – Brent Jones 20 yard pass from Joe Montana (Mike Cofer kick) 49ers 7–3
- SF – Roger Craig 1 yard rush (Mike Cofer kick) 49ers 14–3
- SF – John Taylor 18 yard pass from Joe Montana (Mike Cofer kick) 49ers 21–3

Third quarter

- SF – Mike Cofer 28 yard field goal 49ers 24–3

Fourth quarter

- SF – Mike Cofer 36 yard field goal 49ers 27–3
- SF – Mike Cofer 25 yard field goal 49ers 30–3

Top passers

- LARams – Jim Everett, 16/36, 141 Yds, 3 Ints
- SF – Joe Montana, 26/30, 262 Yds, 2 TDs

Top rushers

- LARams – Greg Bell, 8 Car, 20 Yds
- SF – Roger Craig, 23 Car, 93 Yds, 1 TD

Top receivers

- LARams – Buford McGee, 7 Rec, 53 Yds
- SF – Jerry Rice, 6 Rec, 55 Yds

Top tacklers

- LARams -
- SF -

Turnovers

- LARams – 3
- SF – 2

=== Super Bowl XXIV ===
Super Bowl XXIV: San Francisco 49ers vs. Denver Broncos – Game summary

Quarter	1	2	3	4	Total
49ers	13	14	14	14	55
Broncos	3	0	7	0	10

at Louisiana Superdome, New Orleans, Louisiana

- Date: January 28, 1990
- Game time: 2:15 p.m. PST/4:15 p.m. CST
- Game weather: indoors
- Game attendance: 72,919
- Referee: Dick Jorgensen
- TV announcers (CBS): Pat Summerall (play-by-play), John Madden (color commentator), Will McDonough (sideline reporter)
- Pro-Football-Reference.com

Game information

First quarter

- SF – Jerry Rice 20 yard pass from Joe Montana – (Mike Cofer kick) 49ers 7–0
- DEN – David Treadwell 42 yard field goal 49ers 7–3
- SF – Brent Jones 7 yard pass from Joe Montana – (kick failed) 49ers 13–3

Second quarter

- SF – Tom Rathman 1 yard rush – (Mike Cofer kick) 49ers 20–3
- SF – Jerry Rice 38 yard pass from Joe Montana – (Mike Cofer kick) 49ers 27–3

Third quarter

- SF – Jerry Rice 28 yard pass from Joe Montana – (Mike Cofer kick) 49ers 34–3
- SF – John Taylor 35 yard pass from Joe Montana – (Mike Cofer kick) 49ers 41–3
- DEN – John Elway 3 yard rush – (David Treadwell kick) 49ers 41–10

Fourth quarter

- SF – Tom Rathman 3 yard rush – (Mike Cofer kick) 49ers 48–10
- SF – Roger Craig 1 yard rush – (Mike Cofer kick) 49ers 55–10

Top passers

- SF – Joe Montana, 22/29, 297 Yds, 5 TDs
- DEN – John Elway, 10/26, 108 Yds, 2 Ints

Top rushers

- SF – Roger Craig, 20 Car, 69 Yds, 1 TD
- DEN – Bobby Humphrey, 12 Car, 61 Yds

Top receivers

- SF – Jerry Rice, 7 Rec, 148 Yds, 3 TDs
- DEN – Bobby Humphrey, 3 Rec, 38 Yds

Top tacklers

- SF –
- DEN –

Turnovers

- SF – 0
- DEN – 4

With the win, the 49ers secured both their second straight Super Bowl (4th title overall) and the largest margin of victory in Super Bowl history. However, this would be both the 49ers last Super Bowl until 1994, as well as their last with Joe Montana at QB.

== Media ==
=== Pre season Local TV ===
Channel	Play-by-play	Color commentator(s)
KPIX-TV 5		

=== Local Radio ===
Flagship station	Play-by-play	Color commentator(s)	Sideline reporter (s)
KGO–AM 810	Joe Starkey	Wayne Walker	

== 1990 AFC-NFC Pro Bowl ==
Number	Player	Position	Conference
33	Roger Craig	RB	NFC Pro Bowlers
42	Ronnie Lott	FS	NFC Pro Bowlers
62	Guy McIntyre	G	NFC Pro Bowlers
16	Joe Montana	QB, Starter	NFC Pro Bowlers
80	Jerry Rice	WR, Starter	NFC Pro Bowlers
82	John Taylor	WR	NFC Pro Bowlers

== Awards and records ==
- Led NFC with 442 points scored
- Led NFL, 27.6 points per game
- Mike Cofer, Led NFL, 136 Points
- Roger Craig, NFC Pro Bowl
- Ronnie Lott, NFC Pro Bowl
- Guy McIntyre, NFC Pro Bowl
- Joe Montana, Most Valuable Player, Super Bowl XXIV
- Joe Montana, NFL Most Valuable Player Award
- Joe Montana, PFWA NFL MVP
- Joe Montana, NEA NFL MVP
- Joe Montana, NFL Offensive Player of the Year Award
- Joe Montana, Offense, UPI NFC Player of the Year
- Joe Montana, Bert Bell Award
- Joe Montana, NFL Passing Leader
- Joe Montana, NFC Pro Bowl
- Joe Montana, Associated Press Athlete of the Year
- Jerry Rice, NFL Leader, Receiving Yards
- Jerry Rice, NFL Leader, Receiving Touchdowns
- Jerry Rice, NFC Pro Bowl
- John Taylor, NFC Pro Bowl
