= Gordon V. Frederick =

American politician

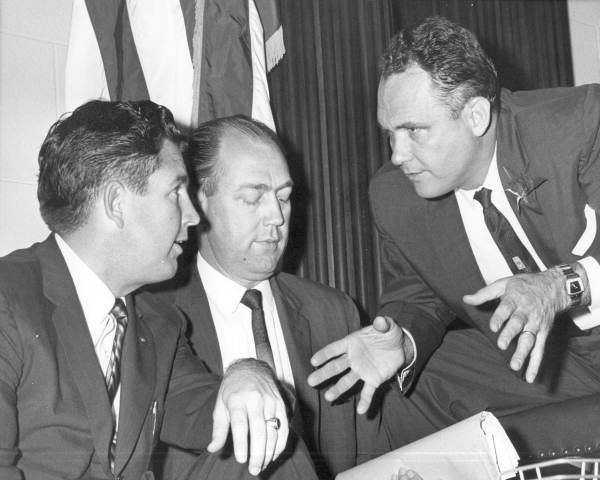
- Frederick (center) with Mack Cleveland and Bill Chappell, 1961

Member of the Florida House of Representatives from Seminole County
- In office May 29, 1956 – November 1962 Serving with Mack Cleveland
- Preceded by: Volie A. Williams Jr.
- Succeeded by: S. J. Davis Jr.

Personal details
- Born: Gordon Victor Frederick; September 19, 1924 Sanford, Florida, U.S.
- Died: September 19, 2000 (aged 76) Orlando, Florida, U.S.
- Party: Democratic
- Education: Stetson University

Gordon Victor Frederick (September 19, 1924 – September 19, 2000) was an American politician. He served as a Democratic member of the Florida House of Representatives.

Frederick was born in Sanford, Florida, and attended Stetson University. In 1956, he won the election for an office of the Florida House of Representatives, succeeding Volie A. Williams Jr. He served along with Mack Cleveland. In 1962, Frederick was succeeded by S. J. Davis Jr.. for the office. He died on his 76th birthday in Orlando, Florida. Frederick was buried in Oaklawn Memorial Park.
