= C. Fred Arrington =

American politician (1922–1974)

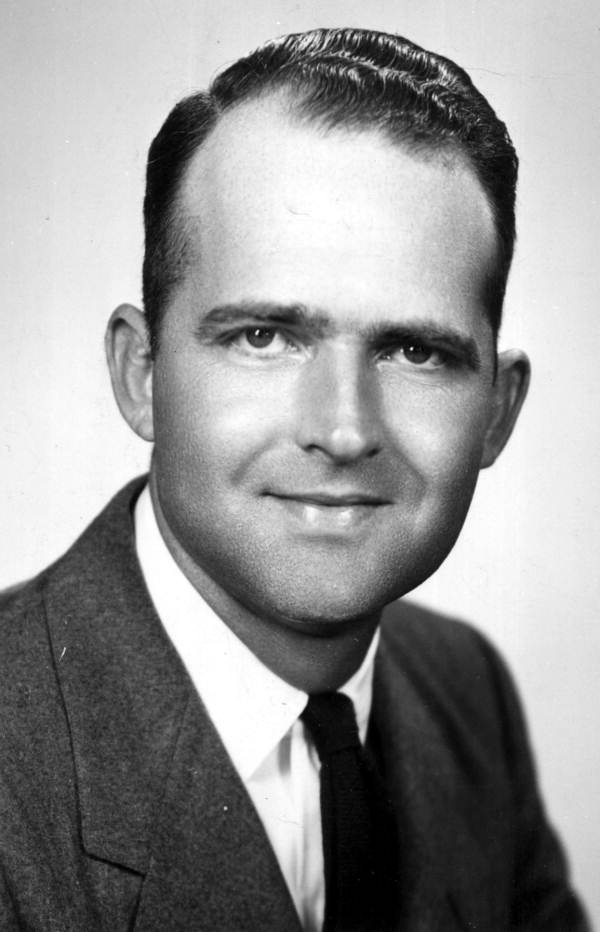
- Arrington in 1959

Member of the Florida House of Representatives from Gadsden County
- In office 1955–1963

Personal details
- Born: April 16, 1922 Havana, Florida, U.S.
- Died: November 25, 1974 (aged 52)
- Party: Democratic

C. Fred Arrington (April 16, 1922 – November 25, 1974) was an American politician. He served as a Democratic member of the Florida House of Representatives.

== Life and career ==
Arrington was born in Havana, Florida.

Arrington served in the Florida House of Representatives from 1955 to 1963.

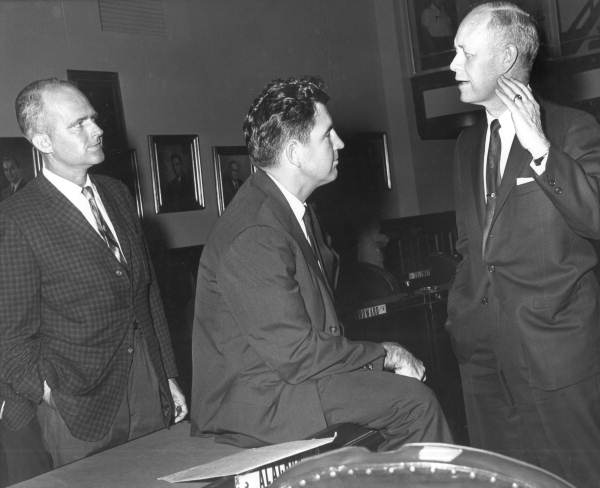
Arrington (left) with Mack Cleveland and C. Farris Bryant, 1961

Arrington died on November 25, 1974, at the age of 52.
