= Marion Bartow Smith =

American politician

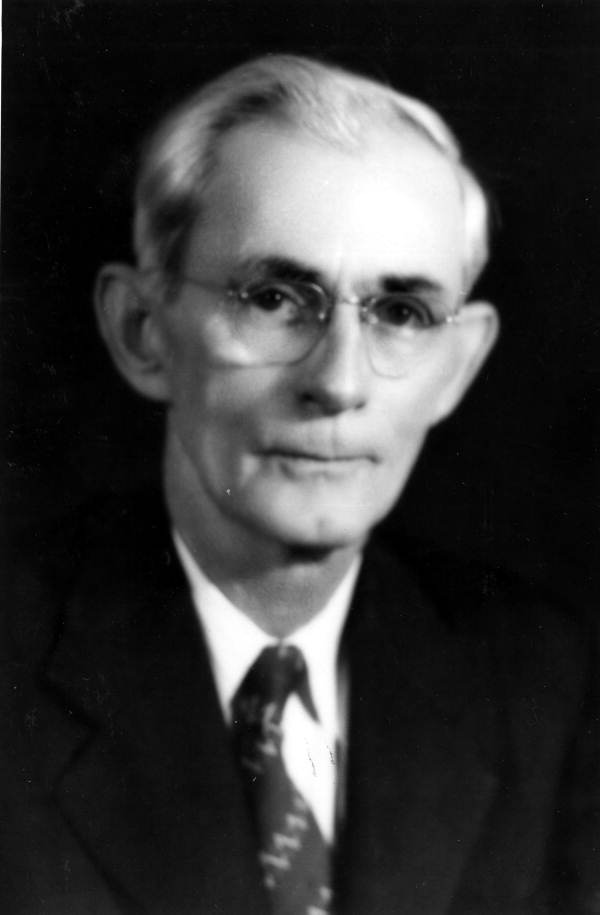
- Smith in 1947

Member of the Florida House of Representatives from Seminole County
- In office 1943–1952

Personal details
- Born: October 4, 1879 Oglethorpe, Georgia, U.S.
- Died: December 18, 1962 (aged 83)
- Party: Democratic
- Nickname: T-Bone

Marion Bartow Smith (October 4, 1879 – December 18, 1962) was an American politician often referred to as M. B. "T-Bone" Smith. He served as a Democratic member of the Florida House of Representatives.

== Life and career ==
Smith was born in Oglethorpe, Georgia.

Smith served in the Florida House of Representatives from 1943 to 1952. He stood for re-election in 1952 but was defeated by Mack N. Cleveland Jr. in the primaries. He ran again the following term in 1954, this time in Group 2, against the incumbent Volie Williams Jr, but lost 1234 to 785 votes.

Smith died on December 18, 1962, at the age of 83 in a nursing home.
