= Lake Jennie =

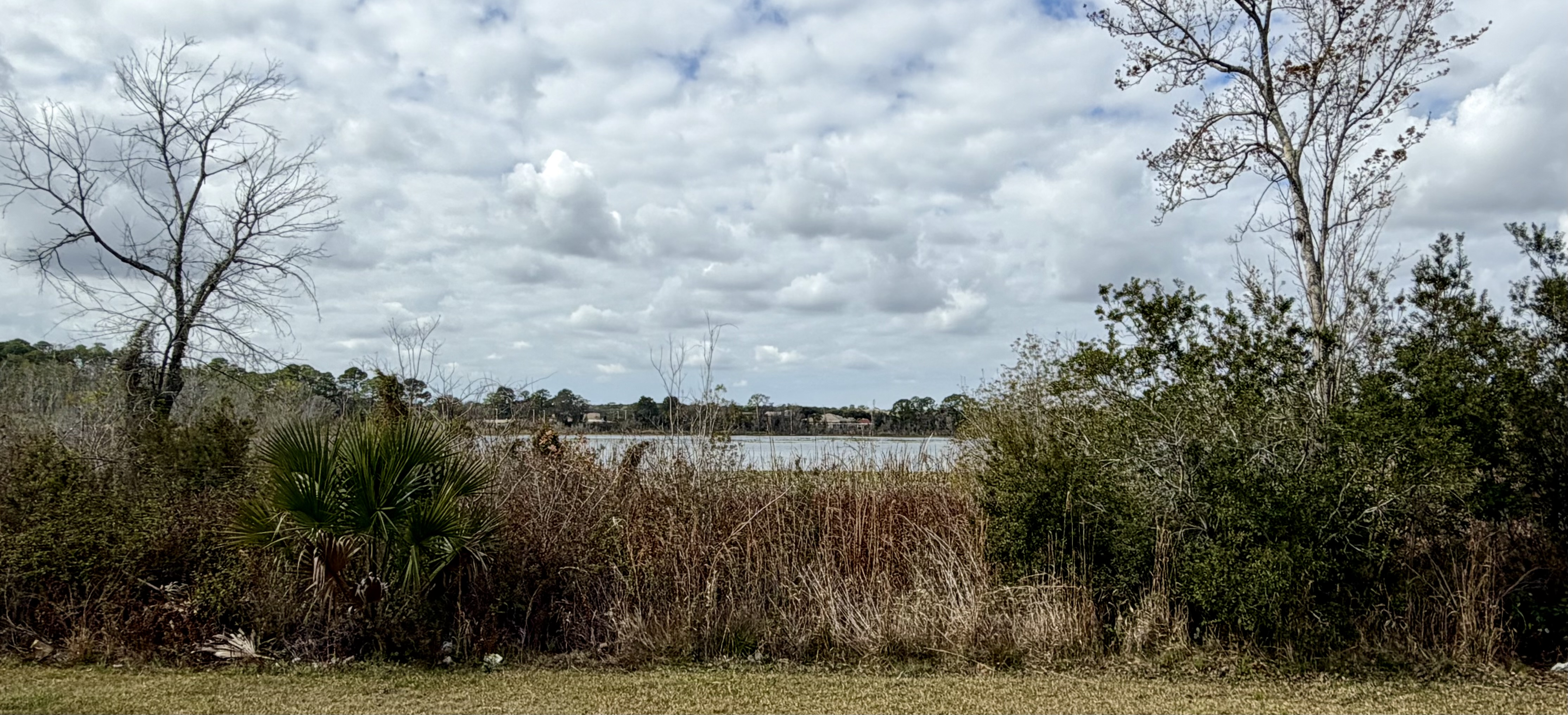
- Lake Jennie viewed through shoreline grasses

- Location within Florida
- Location: Sanford, Florida
- Coordinates: 28.7773°N 81.2803°W
- Lake type: natural freshwater lake
- Basin countries: United States
- Max. length: 1,645 feet (501 m)
- Max. width: 1,105 feet (337 m)
- Surface area: 44.94 acres (18 ha)
- Average depth: 7 feet (2.1 m)
- Max. depth: 24.0 feet (7.3 m)
- Water volume: 12,191,202 US gallons (46,148,720 L)
- Surface elevation: 39 feet (12 m)

Lake Jennie is a somewhat rectangular freshwater lake in the city of Sanford, which is in Seminole County, Florida. Along the northwest, this lake is bordered by Seminole High School. On the southwest is a park. Most of the rest is bordered by commercial properties.

This lake has no public swimming areas or boat docks.
