= Senator Cleveland =

Senator Cleveland may refer to:

- Annette Cleveland (born 1962), Washington State Senate
- Benjamin Cleveland (1738–1806), North Carolina State Senate
- Bill Cleveland (1902–1974), Louisiana State Senate
- George C. Cleveland (1874–1935), California State Senate
- James Colgate Cleveland (1920–1995), New Hampshire State Senate
- Jesse Franklin Cleveland (1804–1841), Georgia State Senate
- John Cleveland (politician) (born 1950), Maine State Senate
- Mack Cleveland (1924–2010), Florida State Senate
