= Matthew Allan (baseball) =

American baseball player (born 2001)

Free agent
- Pitcher
- Born: April 17, 2001 (age 24); Fullerton, California, U.S.
- Bats: Right Throws: Right
Medals
Men's baseball
Representing United States
U-12 Baseball World Cup
Gold medal – first place	2013 Taipei	Team

Matthew Bruce Allan (born April 17, 2001) is an American professional baseball pitcher who is a free agent.

== Amateur career ==
Allan attended Seminole High School in Sanford, Florida. During his senior year, he threw a perfect game in which he struck out 17 batters. He was named the 2019 Florida High School Player of the Year by Perfect Game. Allan committed to play college baseball at the University of Florida.

== Professional career ==
Allan was drafted by the New York Mets in the third round with the 89th overall selection in the 2019 Major League Baseball draft. He was considered a top prospect for the draft, but fell due to his strong commitment to Florida. He signed for $2.5 million, the richest deal ever for a third round selection. He made his professional debut with the Rookie-level Gulf Coast League Mets before being promoted to the Brooklyn Cyclones of the Low-A New York–Penn League. Over 10 1/3 innings between both teams, he went 1–0 with a 2.61 ERA and 14 strikeouts. He did not play a minor league game in 2020 due to the cancellation of the minor league season caused by the COVID-19 pandemic.

On May 7, 2021, it was announced that Allan would require Tommy John surgery, causing him to miss the 2021 season. He underwent a cleanup procedure in January 2022, and missed the 2022 season as well.

On February 4, 2023, it was announced that Allan had undergone UCL revision surgery in January, and would likely miss the 2023 season, his fourth consecutive season with no game action.

Allan returned to action in 2025 after missing the previous five seasons. In 11 appearances (nine starts) split between Brooklyn and the Single-A St. Lucie Mets, he compiled an 0-3 record and 3.60 ERA with 23 strikeouts over 20 innings of work. Allan elected free agency following the season on November 6, 2025.
