= Charles Riggins =

American football player (1959–2024)

No. 90, 99, 94
- Position: Defensive end

Personal information
- Born: November 9, 1959; Sanford, Florida, U.S.
- Died: September 14, 2024 (aged 64); Tampa, Florida, U.S.
- Listed height: 6 ft 5 in (1.96 m)
- Listed weight: 295 lb (134 kg)

Career information
- High school: Seminole (Sanford, Florida)
- College: Bethune-Cookman
- NFL draft: 1982: 9th round, 237th overall pick

Career history
- Green Bay Packers (1982)*; Washington Redskins (1983)*; Tampa Bay Bandits (1984); Orlando Renegades (1985); Tampa Bay Buccaneers (1987)
- * Offseason or practice squad member only

Career NFL statistics
- Sacks: 2
- Stats at Pro Football Reference

Charles LaCarda Riggins (November 9, 1959 – September 14, 2024) was an American football player. A defensive end in the National Football League (NFL), Riggins was selected by the Green Bay Packers in the ninth round of the 1982 NFL draft. He would later play with the Tampa Bay Buccaneers during the 1987 NFL season. Riggins died in Tampa, Florida, on September 14, 2024, at the age of 64.
