= Ray-Ray Armstrong =

American football player (born 1991)

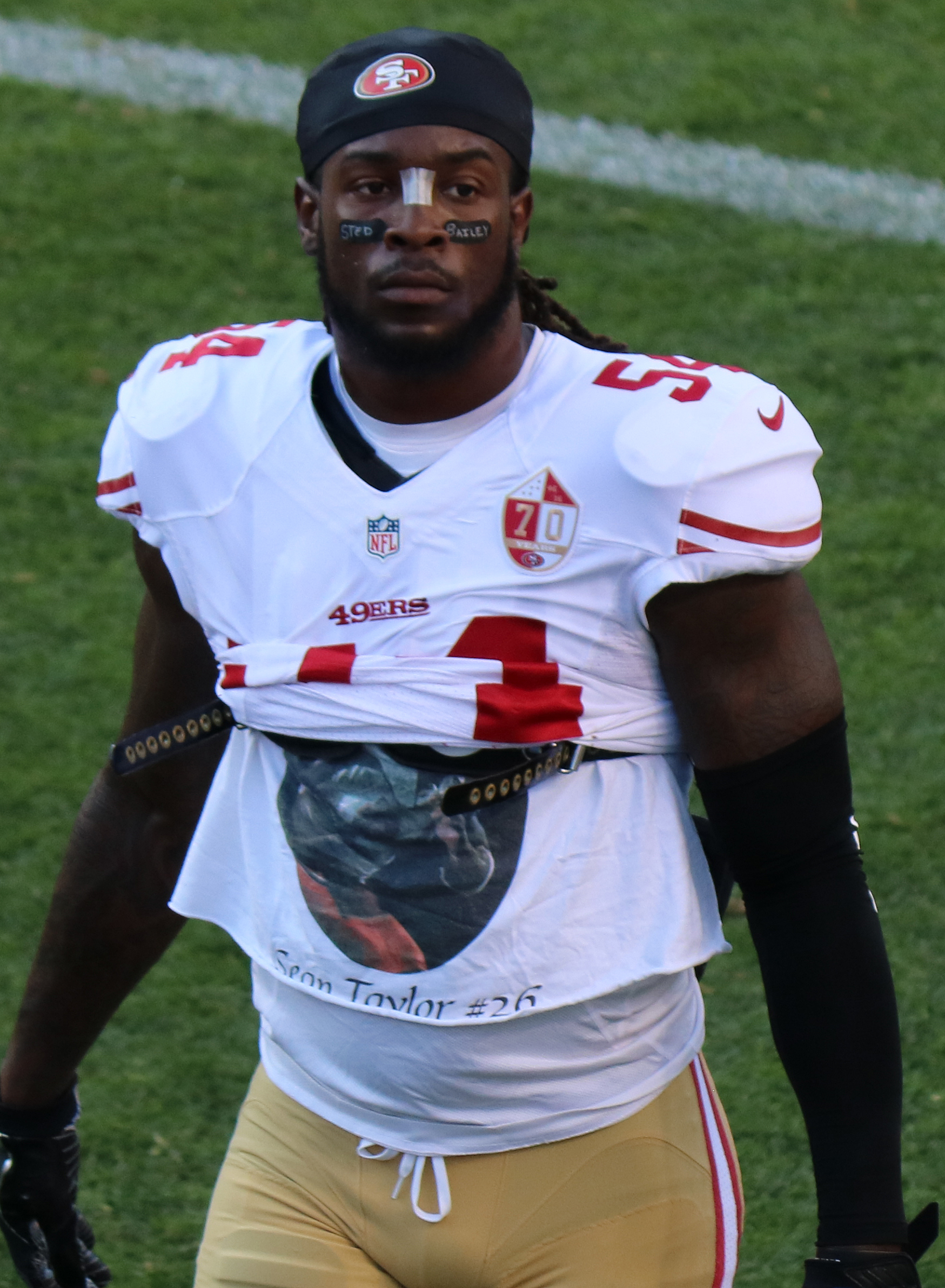
- Armstrong with the San Francisco 49ers in 2016

No. 50, 57, 54, 55, 52, 41
- Position: Linebacker

Personal information
- Born: March 5, 1991 (age 35); Sanford, Florida, U.S.
- Listed height: 6 ft 3 in (1.91 m)
- Listed weight: 220 lb (100 kg)

Career information
- High school: Seminole (Sanford)
- College: Miami (FL)
- NFL draft: 2013: undrafted

Career history
- St. Louis Rams (2013–2014); Oakland Raiders (2014–2015); San Francisco 49ers (2015–2017); New York Giants (2017–2018); Cleveland Browns (2018); New Orleans Saints (2019); Dallas Cowboys (2019); Seattle Seahawks (2020)

Awards and highlights
- Second-team All-ACC (2010)

Career NFL statistics
- Total tackles: 156
- Sacks: 2.0
- Forced fumbles: 3
- Fumble recoveries: 3
- Interceptions: 3
- Stats at Pro Football Reference

Aravious "Ray-Ray" Armstrong (born March 5, 1991) is an American former professional football player who was a linebacker in the National Football League (NFL). He played college football for the Miami Hurricanes from 2009 to 2012. He was signed by the St. Louis Rams as an undrafted free agent.

== Early life ==
Armstrong attended Seminole High School in Sanford, Florida. He played both quarterback and safety.

As a senior, he led Seminole to the 2008 FHSAA Class 6A state championship over Teddy Bridgewater's Miami Northwestern. During that year he threw for 1,400 yards and 14 touchdowns, rushed for 1,144 yards with 22 touchdowns and caught three passes for 29 yards and one touchdown as a QB. As a safety he had 70 tackles, two interceptions, three forced fumbles and two fumble recoveries.

He was considered the 13th best recruit in 2009 by Rivals.com.

== College career ==
Armstrong accepted a football scholarship from the University of Miami. As a freshman for the Miami Hurricanes in 2009, Armstrong played in 10 games, recording 14 tackles. As a sophomore in 2010, Armstrong took over as a starter and has 66 tackles, three interceptions and a touchdown in 11 games.

On July 18, 2012, Armstrong was dismissed from the Hurricanes football team for being dishonest during an internal investigation.

On August 14, 2012, it was announced that Armstrong had transferred to Faulkner University and would play for the Faulkner Eagles, an NAIA team, during the 2012 season. However, Armstrong was declared ineligible on September 11, 2012, due to the circumstances of his dismissal from the Miami Hurricanes. NAIA rules prohibit any athlete "who has been permanently banned in a given sport at any four-year institution."

== Professional career ==
Pre-draft measurables
Height	Weight	40-yard dash	10-yard split	20-yard split	20-yard shuttle	Three-cone drill	Vertical jump	Broad jump	Bench press	Wonderlic
6 ft 3 in (1.91 m)	216 lb (98 kg)	4.69 s	1.62 s	2.75 s	4.24 s	7.20 s	34 1/2 in (0.88 m)	9 ft 8 in (2.95 m)	18 reps	x
All values from Miami Pro Day

=== St. Louis Rams ===
Armstrong was signed as an undrafted free agent by the St. Louis Rams after the 2013 NFL draft on April 27, 2013. He registered 12 special teams tackles. In 2014, he appeared in 4 games. He was released on October 6.

=== Oakland Raiders ===
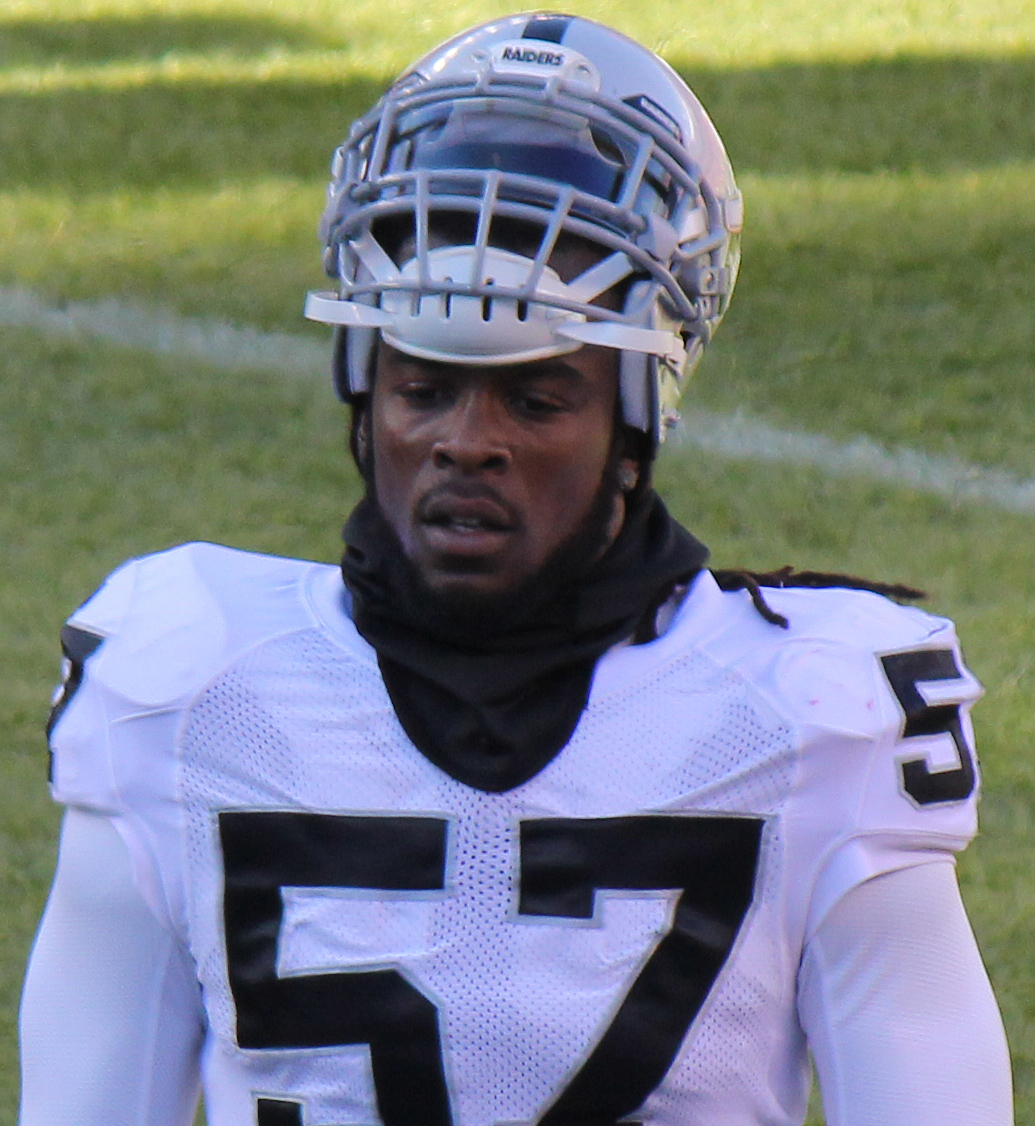
Armstrong with the Oakland Raiders in December 2014

Armstrong was claimed off waivers by the Oakland Raiders on October 7, 2014. He appeared in 11 games (3 starts). In 2015, he appeared in 10 games (2 starts). He was cut on November 24, 2015.

=== San Francisco 49ers ===
On November 25, 2015, Armstrong was claimed off waivers by the San Francisco 49ers. On March 9, 2016, Armstrong signed a one-year contract extension with the 49ers. On September 21, he was placed on injured reserve with a pectoral injury. On December 19, Armstrong signed a two-year contract extension with the 49ers through the 2018 season.

On November 25, 2017, Armstrong was released by the 49ers.

=== New York Giants ===
On November 27, 2017, Armstrong was claimed off waivers by the New York Giants.

On October 16, 2018, Armstrong was placed on the injured reserve after suffering a concussion in Week 6. He appeared in 6 games and registered 20 tackles. Armstrong was released on October 23.

=== Cleveland Browns ===
On October 25, 2018, Armstrong was signed by the Cleveland Browns. He appeared in 9 games. The Browns re-signed Armstrong on a one year $1.550 million contract on March 13, 2019. He was released by the Browns on August 31.

=== New Orleans Saints ===
On September 18, 2019, Armstrong was signed by the New Orleans Saints after the team placed linebacker Alex Anzalone on the injured reserve list. He appeared in five games, playing on special teams. Armstrong was released by the Saints on October 22.

=== Dallas Cowboys ===
On December 24, 2019, Armstrong was signed by the Dallas Cowboys to provide depth because of injuries for the season finale. He had one special teams tackle against the Washington Redskins. He was not re-signed after the season.

=== Seattle Seahawks ===
On October 21, 2020, Armstrong was signed to the Seattle Seahawks' practice squad. He was elevated to the active roster on October 24 and December 12 for the team's Weeks 7 and 14 games against the Arizona Cardinals and New York Jets, and reverted to the practice squad after each game. Armstrong was released by the Seahawks on December 15. On December 30, Armstrong re-signed with Seattle to their practice squad. His practice squad contract with the team expired after the season on January 18, 2021.
