= Charlotte Country Day School =

Private school in Charlotte, North Carolina, US

Location
- 1440 Carmel Road; Charlotte, North Carolina 28226; United States; 35°08′47″N 80°48′13″W

Information
- Type: Private; country day; college preparatory
- Motto: Fortitudine Ac Pietate (With Courage and Reverence)
- Religious affiliation: Nonsectarian
- Established: 1941 (85 years ago)
- Founder: Dr. Thomas Burton
- CEEB code: 340666
- Head of school: Dr. Tara Christie Kinsey
- Faculty: 190+
- Grades: K–12
- Gender: Co-educational
- Enrollment: ~1,600
- Average class size: Approximately 15
- Student to teacher ratio: 12:1
- Campus: Cannon and Bissell campuses
- Campus type: Suburban
- Colors: Green, White, & Black
- Athletics: North Carolina Independent Schools Athletic Association (NCISAA)
- Mascot: Buccaneer
- Nickname: Buccaneers (Bucs)
- Rival: Charlotte Catholic High School, Charlotte Latin School, Providence Day School
- Accreditation: SACS; SAIS
- Tuition: $23,350–$32,450 (2025-26)
- Website: www.charlottecountryday.org

Charlotte Country Day School is a K–12 private, nonsectarian, college preparatory school in Charlotte, North Carolina, United States. CCDS offer classes in grades Junior Kindergarten – 12. The school is accredited by the Southern Association of Colleges and Schools and Southern Association of Independent Schools.

== History ==
Charlotte Country Day School was founded as an independent school in 1941 by headmaster Dr. Thomas Burton. The school opened in September 1941 with 18 students matriculating. By 1945 the Country Day included grades 1 – 8 and had an enrollment of 56 students on a six-acre school site on Sardis Road in suburban Charlotte.

Charlotte Country Day School is rivals with Providence Day School.

The estate of the Martin L. Cannon Jr. made a gift in 1958 that allowed the school to build a new eight building campus on a 30-acre site donated by Mr. and Mrs. James G. Harris on Carmel Road. With the opening of the Cannon Campus, Country Day expanded to a K – 12 college preparatory school. The new campus increased total enrollment capacity from 235 students to 400 students. In 1962 the school graduated its first class of 15 high school seniors.

The advent of busing in the Charlotte Mecklenburg School system caused many independent schools in the region to experience rapid growth in the early 1970s. Country Day had started in 1941 and was not founded in response to desegregation, but it saw an influx of hundreds of new applications during this period. Journalists found it likely that its enrollment benefitted from parents seeking to avoid busing in the public school system. By the 1974-75 school year, Country Day had grown to total enrollment of 873 students in grades K-12.

In 1980 Country Day merged with Carmel Academy, one of several independent schools established in Mecklenburg County in the wake of the Swann decision in 1971. The merger put Carmel Academy, previously operating with no endowment, on more secure financial footing. After combining the schools, middle school grades 5 – 8 moved to the Carmel Academy campus (today referred to as the Bissell campus), about four miles away from the main Cannon campus. The newly combined school changed its mascot from the Rebels to the Buccaneers as part of the merger.

== Cannon campus ==
Cannon Campus for grades JK–4 and 9–12 has 15 buildings, including a full-service dining hall, two libraries, a 400-seat theater, two reading gardens, and multiple computer labs.

The Cannon campus includes the Purdy Center for Science and Mathematics, Harris Performance Gym, and Klein Aquatic Center. Harris Performance Gym serves as the primary competition space for volleyball, basketball, and wrestling.

== Bissell campus ==
Bissell Campus, where CCDS students in grades 5–8 attend classes, underwent extensive renovations in 2009. The 23,000-square-foot (2,100 m^{2}) Dowd Science Building was completed, which added eight science lecture/lab classrooms and two general purpose classrooms. The old science building was renovated to create six foreign language classrooms. Grounds enhancements included a new entryway and fencing, a new front courtyard, and new tennis courts and practice fields. Margret and Smokey Bissell gave this campus. Elsewhere on Bissell Campus, the Sklut Center has three art rooms, the cafeteria, and the general music room. A separate building is dedicated entirely to the natural sciences.

== Notable alumni ==
- Zac Alley – college football coach
- Kristen Anderson-Lopez – songwriter
- William Byron – professional NASCAR Cup Series driver
- Mike Cofer – NFL kicker, two-time Super Bowl champion with the San Francisco 49ers, and stock car racing driver
- Brandon Miller – professional soccer player
- Wes Miller – college basketball head coach and former player
- Alvin Pearman – NFL running back
- Tripp Phillips – former professional tennis player
