= Joe Davis (politician) =

American politician (1923–2021)

S. Joseph Davis, Jr.
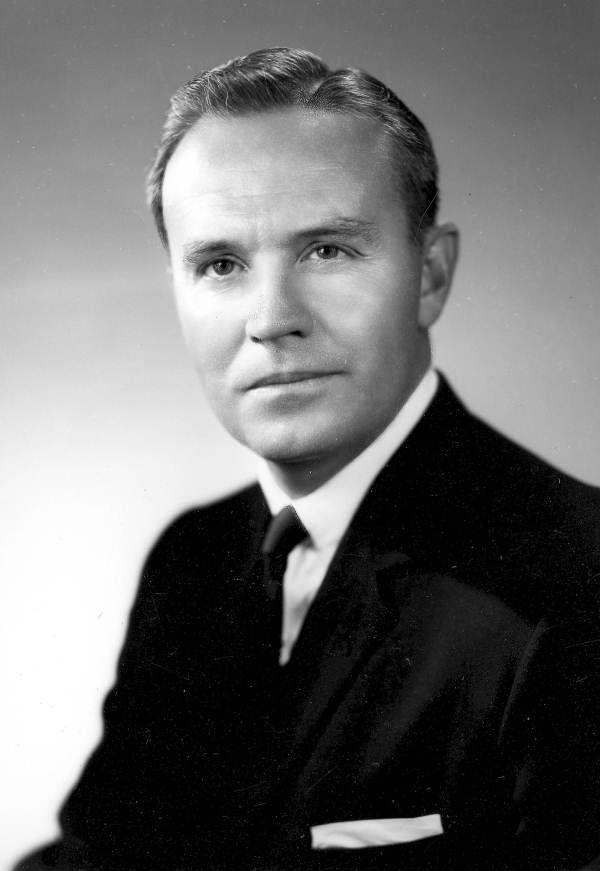

Member of the Florida House of Representatives from the Seminole County district
- In office 1962–1966

Personal details
- Born: Sylvan Joseph Davis, Jr. May 19, 1923 Leesburg, Georgia, U.S.
- Died: September 29, 2021 (aged 98) Florida, U.S.
- Spouse: Betty Jane Woodcock
- Education: Stetson University
- Occupation: attorney, judge

Sylvan Joseph Davis, Jr. (May 19, 1923 – September 29, 2021) was an American politician, lawyer and judge in the state of Florida.

Davis was born in Leesburg, Georgia on May 19, 1923. After moving to Florida in 1930, he was educated in Sanford, Florida and attended Stetson University, where he attained his legal degree in 1954 in the law school of that same institution. He is a member of the Phi Alpha Delta fraternal organization. Admitted to the Florida bar in 1957, he is also a member of the Seminole County and American Bar Associations.

He was elected to the Florida House of Representatives in 1962, serving a two terms, representing Seminole County from 1962 to 1966.

Davis also served stints as City Attorney of Altamonte Springs, Florida, Longwood, Florida, Oviedo, Florida. He later served as a senior judge on the Florida Circuit Court's Eighteenth Judicial Circuit, being initially appointed there by Governor Bob Graham in 1979. He was also a certified mediator and arbitrator.

He was married to Betty Jane Woodcock and had three daughters. An active community man, Davis was a president of the Seminole County Bar Association and Seminole County Chamber of Commerce, among many posts held. He was an active Baptist. Davis died following a brief illness in Florida, on September 29, 2021, at the age of 98.
