= Seminole High School (Seminole County, Florida) =

Public high school in Sanford, Florida, United States

Coordinates: 28.781179°N 81.28357°W

Location
- 2701 Ridgewood Ave; Sanford, Seminole County, Florida 32773; United States

Information
- Type: Public
- Established: 1902; 124 years ago
- School district: Seminole County Public Schools
- Principal: Michael Pfeiffer (formerly Dr. Jordan Rodriguez)
- Staff: 183.50 (FTE)
- Grades: 9–12
- Enrollment: 3,919 (2023-2024)
- Student to teacher ratio: 21.36
- Colors: Orange and Black
- Athletics conference: Seminole athletic conference
- Mascot: Fighting Seminoles
- Website: Seminole High School

Seminole High School, originally established as Sanford High School, is a public high school located in Sanford, Florida, operated by Seminole County Public Schools. From 2006 to 2011, Seminole High School was one of the schools in Seminole County on Newsweek's list of the top 1,200 schools in the United States. The school offers the International Baccalaureate Diploma Programme. The Academy for Health Careers provides a curriculum based on a future career in health care. Students take a health class and health material is integrated into the curriculum of all other subjects. Seminole High also offers Advanced Placement courses in a range of subjects.

== School rankings ==
In the 2007–08, 2008–09, 2009–10, 2010–11, and 2012–13 school year, the Florida Department of Education gave Seminole an "A" ranking. This was an improvement from 2006–07's "C."

Newsweek rated Seminole #303 in their list of the top 1,200 schools in the country in 2006. Newsweek rated Seminole #150 in their list of the top 1,200 high schools in the country in 2007, making it the highest ranked high school in Seminole County.

== History ==
Sanford High School was built in 1902. In 1911 the student population necessitated the building of a new Sanford High School on Sanford Avenue. In 1927 a much larger building opened on French Avenue, and the school was renamed Seminole High School. By 1961 a new sprawling campus was opened at the present location on Ridgewood Avenue, and the old building on French Avenue became Sanford Junior High School (later renamed Sanford Middle School). Seminole High School has grown not only in the size of the campus, but also in student population – in 1907, only four students attended and graduated Seminole High School. Today, the graduation rate in Seminole High School is 86%. The original building on 7th Street was for a time used as the Student Museum, open to elementary field trips to represent the rich history of education in Seminole County. In 2012 that building was reopened, in a partnership between Seminole County and the University of Central Florida as the Public History Museum; this made it open to the general public, as well as laboratory for university students to gain hands-on experience displaying history to the public.

== Renovation ==
In 2004, the school began renovations costing over $10 million, including the construction of new classroom halls; a new media center was opened in 2006, a new gym was opened at the beginning of the 2007-2008 school year, and a new auditorium. The renovation was completed in 2010. Tomahawk Hall opened at the beginning of the second quarter of the 2006-07 school year. A performing arts center, later to be named in honor of former principal Karen W. Coleman, opened in March 2008. Seminole High's Thespians were the first to use the center, producing The Pink Panther Strikes Again that month. Construction on a new building, now called Renegade, was completed in Spring 2009.

Renovations on the cafeteria began in early 2009 and were finished at the beginning of the 2009–10 school year. and the construction on a new building, now called Warrior Hall in the east side of the campus. The current amount of renovations completed, and to be built, total about $55 million.

== International Baccalaureate ==
Seminole High offers both the International Baccalaureate Diploma Programme and the last two years of the IB Middle Years Programme. Many Seminole High IB students begin the Middle Years Programme at one of four Seminole County middle schools which offer the program. IB students spend the first two years of high school in Pre-IB before being officially inducted into IB their junior year at what is known as the "IB Pinning Ceremony".

The IB program has been offered since 1998.

== Additional extra curricular activities ==
Seminole High School hosts Troupe 3266 of the International Thespian Society. Students may take part in the theatre department through classes or audition for the fall play and spring musical.

The school newspaper, The Seminole, is an elective course in which students may involve themselves in journalism, publishing, layout/design, photography, and advertising.

Students may also be a part of the school’s yearbook, the Salmagundi Yearbook. Students must fill out an application and go through an interview process before being selected.

=== Athletics ===
Sports practiced at the school include baseball, basketball, cheerleading, dance, track and cross country running, football, golf, lacrosse, soccer, softball, swimming and diving, tennis, volleyball, water polo, weightlifting, wrestling, and bowling.

The Seminole High School Varsity football played in the 6A Florida State Finals on December 20, 2008 winning against Miami Northwestern High School.

As of the 2017–18 school year, the varsity football team plays in the 8A division.

In the 2020 school year, the school became the state champions for the 8A division. The varsity football team won the 8A Florida State Finals against the Osceola Kowboys on December 19, 2020, with a score of 38-10. This made them the third high school in Central Florida history (behind Apopka and Bishop Moore) to win more than one football state championship. Prior to the finals, the team was undefeated 11-0 (12-0 with the final).

Seminole High School hosts the Dazzler Dance Team. The Dazzlers have earned over 16 National Titles in high kick since 1997, and have numerous other awards in field marching/performing, jazz, contemporary, pom, hip hop, lyrical, and military.

== Notable alumni ==
- Matthew Allan - Former professional baseball pitcher for the New York Mets organization
- Ray-Ray Armstrong – Former NFL linebacker last playing for the Seattle Seahawks.
- Red Barber – Noted Ford C. Frick Award recipient and sportscaster for the Cincinnati Reds, Brooklyn Dodgers, and New York Yankees.
- Jeff Blake – Former NFL quarterback last playing for the Chicago Bears
- John F. Bolt – Recipient of the Navy Cross and only Marine to achieve the title of ace in both World War II and the Korean War.
- Reggie Branch – Former running back for the Washington Redskins
- Mack Cleveland (Class of 1942) – attorney and state legislator from Seminole County
- Gabe Davis – NFL wide receiver for the Buffalo Bills and previously the Jacksonville Jaguars. Holds NFL record for most receiving touchdowns in a single playoff game.
- David Eckstein – Former MLB shortstop who was the 2006 World Series MVP with St. Louis Cardinals
- Kadeem Edwards – Former NFL player
- Jeff Faine – Former NFL center last playing for the Cincinnati Bengals
- Vienna Girardi – Winner of season 14 of The Bachelor
- Jimmy Horn Jr. - Wide receiver for the Carolina Panthers
- Ben Kozlowski – Former professional baseball player for the Texas Rangers
- Matt Kuchar – Professional golfer on the PGA Tour with 9 PGA tour wins and 11 other tour wins. Olympic bronze medalist in the 2016 Rio de Janeiro Olympic Games Men's Golf.
- Doug Marlette – Pulitzer Prize winning cartoonist and author
- Timmy McClain - College football quarterback for the Bethune-Cookman Wildcats, previously played for the Arkansas State Red Wolves, the South Florida Bulls, the UCF Knights
- Ron Moore – NFL defensive tackle
- David Nelson (Alaska politician) – Former Alaska politician
- Tim Raines – Retired MLB player and current coach. MLB Hall of Fame.
- Tim Raines Jr. – Former professional baseball centerfielder for the Baltimore Orioles
- Hardy Rawls – Actor on TV sitcom The Adventures of Pete & Pete
- Charles Riggins – Former NFL player last playing for the Tampa Bay Buccaneers
- Jeff Roth – AFL player
