= Jeff Roth =

American football player (born 1966)

Profile
- Position: Defensive tackle

Personal information
- Born: April 21, 1966 (age 60); New York, New York, U.S.
- Listed height: 6 ft 3 in (1.91 m)
- Listed weight: 260 lb (118 kg)

Career information
- High school: Seminole (Sanford, Florida)
- College: Florida
- NFL draft: 1989: 5th round, 125th overall pick

Career history
- Dallas Cowboys (1989)*; San Francisco 49ers (1989)*; Miami Dolphins (1990)*; Orlando Predators (1991–1992)
- * Offseason or practice squad member only

Awards and highlights
- Super Bowl champion (XXIV); 2× Second-team All-SEC (1987, 1988)
- Stats at ArenaFan.com

Jeffery Neil Roth (born April 21, 1966) is an American former professional football player who was a defensive tackle in the Arena Football League (AFL) for the Orlando Predators. He also was a member of the San Francisco 49ers in the National Football League (NFL). He played college football for the Florida Gators.

== Early life ==
Roth attended Seminole High School, where he was a starter at outside linebacker. As a senior, he collected 15 sacks and was named Clearwater Sun defensive player of the year.

He accepted a football scholarship from the University of Florida, where he was converted into a defensive lineman. As a redshirt freshman in 1985, he started 5 games at nose tackle in one of the nation's best defenses. He had 2 sacks against Mississippi State University, earning his first start in the fourth game against Louisiana State University. He made 10 tackles against Auburn University. He finished the season with 44 tackles, 6 sacks, 7 tackles for loss, 2 passes defensed and received second-team freshman All-American honors.

As a sophomore, he was named a full-time starter at nose tackle. He posted 76 tackles (seventh on the team), 3 sacks, 11 tackles for loss and 2 passes defensed. He had 10 tackles in the eighth game against Auburn University. He made 11 tackles in the tenth game against the University of Kentucky.

As a junior, he was limited with back and ankle injuries, tallying 48 tackles, 6 sacks, 11 tackles for loss and one fumble recovery. In the 1987 Aloha Bowl, he had 4 tackles, one sack, 2 tackles for loss and one quarterback pressure.

As a senior, he registered 50 tackles, 2 sacks, 15 tackles for loss (led the team), 2 passes defensed and one forced fumble. He had 7 tackles, a shared sack, 2 tackles for loss and one quarterback pressure against the University of Memphis.

He finished his college career with school marks for defensive lineman, first all-time in tackles for loss (44) and third all-time in sacks (17). He also posted 218 tackles, 6 passes defensed. one forced fumble and one fumble recovery.

== Professional career ==
Roth was selected by the Dallas Cowboys in the fifth round (125th overall) of the 1989 NFL draft. He was waived before the start of the season on September 4. In December, he was signed to the San Francisco 49ers' practice squad. On January 22, 1990, he was released to make room to activate linebacker Jim Fahnhorst.

On March 30, 1990, he signed as a free agent with the Miami Dolphins, where he was tried at nose tackle and defensive end. He was released on September 3.

In 1991, he signed with the Orlando Predators of the Arena Football League. He announced his retirement from football after the 1992 season.
