= Keith Henderson (American football) =

American football player (born 1966)

No. 30
- Position: Running back

Personal information
- Born: August 4, 1966 (age 60); Cartersville, Georgia, U.S.
- Listed height: 6 ft 1 in (1.85 m)
- Listed weight: 220 lb (100 kg)

Career information
- High school: Cartersville
- College: Georgia
- NFL draft: 1989: 3rd round, 84th overall pick

Career history
- San Francisco 49ers (1989–1992); Minnesota Vikings (1992)

Awards and highlights
- Super Bowl champion (XXIV)

Career NFL statistics
- Rushing yards: 755
- Rushing average: 3.9
- Rushing touchdowns: 4
- Stats at Pro Football Reference

Keith Pernell Henderson (born August 4, 1966) is an American former professional football player who was a running back for the San Francisco 49ers and Minnesota Vikings of the National Football League (NFL).

Henderson attended the University of Georgia. He was selected in the third round (84th overall) of the 1989 NFL draft by the 49ers. He was acquired by the Vikings in September 1992.

== Statistics ==
Henderson's stats with the Georgia Bulldogs
| | Rushing | | | | | Receiving | | | | |
| YEAR | ATT | YDS | AVG | LNG | TD | NO. | YDS | AVG | LNG | TD |
|---|---|---|---|---|---|---|---|---|---|---|
| 1985 | 108 | 731 | 6.8 | 76 | 3 | 8 | 67 | 8.4 | 18 | 0 |
| 1986 | 96 | 523 | 5.5 | 50 | 1 | 16 | 231 | 14.4 | 33 | 1 |
| 1987 | — | — | — | — | — | — | — | — | — | — |
| 1988 | 69 | 394 | 5.7 | 31 | 3 | 20 | 297 | 14.9 | 43 | 2 |
| Totals | 273 | 1,648 | 6.0 | 76 | 7 | 44 | 595 | 13.5 | 43 | 3 |

Henderson's stats in the NFL
| | Rushing | | | | | | Receiving | | | | |
| YEAR | TEAM | ATT | YDS | AVG | LNG | TD | NO. | YDS | AVG | LNG | TD |
|---|---|---|---|---|---|---|---|---|---|---|---|
| 1989 | SFO | 7 | 30 | 4.3 | 11 | 1 | 3 | 130 | 43.3 | 78 | 0 |
| 1990 | SFO | 6 | 14 | 2.3 | 9 | 0 | 4 | 35 | 8.8 | 9 | 0 |
| 1991 | SFO | 137 | 561 | 4.1 | 25 | 2 | 30 | 303 | 10.1 | 23 | 0 |
| 1992 | SFO | 10 | 37 | 3.7 | 9 | 0 | 1 | 4 | 4.0 | 4 | 0 |
| 1992 | MIN | 34 | 113 | 3.3 | 12 | 1 | 4 | 60 | 15.0 | 23 | 0 |
| Totals | — | 194 | 755 | 3.9 | 25 | 4 | 42 | 532 | 12.7 | 78 | 0 |
