= Jeff Stephenson =

American football player (born 1965)

No. 97, 98, 61
- Positions: Linebacker, defensive lineman

Personal information
- Born: December 14, 1965 (age 60); Forrest City, Arkansas, U.S.
- Listed height: 6 ft 4 in (1.93 m)
- Listed weight: 240 lb (109 kg)

Career information
- High school: North Community (Minneapolis, Minnesota)
- College: St. Cloud State (1985–1988)
- NFL draft: 1989: undrafted

Career history
- Seattle Seahawks (1989)*; Los Angeles Raiders (1989)*; San Francisco 49ers (1989–1990)*; BC Lions (1990); San Antonio Riders (1991)*; Buffalo Bills (1992)*
- * Offseason or practice squad member only

Awards and highlights
- Super Bowl champion (XXIV)

Career CFL statistics
- Games played: 1
- Tackles: 1

Jeffrey Stephenson (born December 14, 1965) is an American former professional football linebacker and defensive lineman who played in the National Football League (NFL) for the Seattle Seahawks, Los Angeles Raiders, San Francisco 49ers and Buffalo Bills. He played college football for the St. Cloud State Huskies. Stephenson also had stints in the Canadian Football League (CFL) with the BC Lions and World League of American Football (WLAF) with the San Antonio Riders.

== Early life ==
Stephenson was born on December 14, 1965, in Forrest City, Arkansas. He attended North Community High School in Minneapolis, Minnesota.

== College career ==
Stephenson played college football for the St. Cloud State Huskies from 1985 to 1988.

== Professional career ==
=== Seattle Seahawks ===
After going undrafted in the 1989 NFL draft, Stephenson signed with the Seattle Seahawks as an undrafted free agent. On September 4, he was released by the team.

=== Los Angeles Raiders ===
Stephenson was signed to the practice squad by Los Angeles Raiders on September 22, 1989. On October 4, he was waived from the practice squad.

=== San Francisco 49ers ===
On November 29, 1989, the San Francisco 49ers signed Stephenson to the practice squad. On January 28, 1990, the 49ers defeated the Denver Broncos in Super Bowl XXIV and he was awarded a Super Bowl ring. On August 27, he was released.

=== BC Lions ===
On September 4, 1990, Stephenson signed to the practice roster of the BC Lions. However, he left the team after failing to agree to contract terms. On September 26, Stephenson re-signed to the practice roster. On October 5, he was elevated to the active roster and made his first and only start for the Lions the following day. In a loss to the Ottawa Rough Riders, Stephenson made one tackle and reverted to the practice roster. On October 14, he was released.

=== San Antonio Riders ===
Stephenson was selected with the San Antonio Riders' first pick in the 1991 World League of American Football supplemental draft. On March 16, 1991, he was released by the team.

=== Buffalo Bills ===
On February 21, 1992, Stephenson signed with the Buffalo Bills. On August 25, he was placed on the injured reserve after he suffered a broken leg. Stephenson remained on the injured reserve through the entire 1992 season and became a free agent at its conclusion.
