= Mike Cofer (kicker) =

American football player and race car driver (born 1964)

No. 4, 6, 3
- Position: Placekicker

Personal information
- Born: February 19, 1964 (age 62); Columbia, South Carolina, U.S.
- Listed height: 6 ft 1 in (1.85 m)
- Listed weight: 195 lb (88 kg)

Career information
- High school: Charlotte Country Day (Charlotte, North Carolina)
- College: NC State
- NFL draft: 1987: undrafted

Career history
- Cleveland Browns (1987)*; New Orleans Saints (1987); San Francisco 49ers (1988–1993); Indianapolis Colts (1995)
- * Offseason or practice squad member only

Awards and highlights
- 2× Super Bowl champion (XXIII, XXIV); First-team All-Pro (1989); NFL scoring leader (1989); First-team All-ACC (1986)

Career NFL statistics
- Field goals made: 133
- Field goal attempts: 201
- Field goal %: 66.2
- Longest field goal: 56
- Stats at Pro Football Reference

NASCAR FedEx Freight Truck Series career
- 3 races run over 1 year
- Best finish: 61st (2002)
- First race: 2002 Power Stroke Diesel 200 (IRP)
- Last race: 2002 Ford 200 (Homestead)
Wins	Top tens	Poles
0	0	0
- Statistics up to date as of February 13, 2012.

James Michael Cofer (born February 19, 1964) is an American former professional football player who was a placekicker for eight seasons in the National Football League (NFL). He attended Charlotte Country Day School. A 6'2", 197 lb (89 kg) kicker from North Carolina State University, Cofer played in the NFL from 1987 to 1993 and 1995. In the 1990s and 2002, he was also a stock car racing driver in the NASCAR Featherlite Southwest Tour and NASCAR Craftsman Truck Series.

== Professional career ==
After going undrafted, Cofer was signed by the Cleveland Browns in the off-season, but was ultimately released and picked up by the New Orleans Saints, where he would put up a single made field goal attempt, as well as five made extra points out of seven attempted in two games.

=== San Francisco 49ers ===
==== 1988 ====
In 1988, Cofer's first season with the team, he ended with 27 of 38 field goal attempts made, as well as 40 of 41 extra point attempts made. Despite his inconsistency, the 49ers would move on to Super Bowl XXIII, where they would defeat the Cincinnati Bengals 20–16. For his performance in the season, Cofer would earn NFL All-Rookie honors.

==== 1989 ====
Cofer's kicking slightly improved in 1989; he successfully made 29 of 36 field goal attempts, and also successfully made 49 of his 51 extra-point attempts. This season would prove to be one of the 49ers' most dominant in franchise history, as after making it to Super Bowl XXIV, during which Cofer made seven out of eight extra point attempts, they would beat the Denver Broncos 55–10, accounting for the most points ever scored by a winning team in a Super Bowl. For his performance this season (which included being the NFL's leader in scoring), Cofer would earn a First-team All-Pro nomination.

==== 1990 ====
Cofer's kicking would become inconsistent in 1990, as he only made 24 of his 36 field goal attempts, although he did successfully make all 39 of his extra point attempts. Despite his lows in kicking, the 49ers would successfully make it to the NFC Championship Game, where Cofer would successfully make two field goals, as well as his sole extra point attempt, in the 13–15 loss against the New York Giants.

==== 1991–1993 ====
Cofer's stats became more inconsistent in 1991; he would only make 14 of his 28 field goal attempts, good for a staggering 50%, but once again made almost all of his extra point attempts, successfully making 49 of 50 extra-point attempts. In this year, despite having a 10–6 record, Cofer and the 49ers would miss the playoffs.

In 1992, Cofer's field goal kicking would slightly improve, though he still only made 18 of his 27 field goal attempts. The 49ers would move on the NFC Championship game, where Cofer missed a first half field goal attempt and made both of his extra point attempts in the 20–30 defeat to the Dallas Cowboys.

In 1993, his final season with the 49ers, Cofer's field goal percentage would drop again as he made only 16 of his 26 field goal attempts, but once again was consistent with extra-points, successfully making 59 of his 61 extra point attempts. The 49ers would once again face the Cowboys in the NFC Championship game, but once again lost, 21–38, as Cofer made all three of his extra-point attempts. Following this, Cofer left the 49ers, and he would not return to play for a team for the 1994 season.

=== Indianapolis Colts ===
Cofer returned to the NFL in 1995, signing with the Indianapolis Colts. With them, he only played four games, making just four of nine field goal attempts, and making all nine of his extra point attempts. Following his last game with the Colts, he decided to retire and pursue other endeavors, including racing.

== NFL career statistics ==
**Bold**	Career high

=== Regular season ===
Year	Team	GP	Overall FGs				PATs			Kickoffs			Points
Year	Team	GP	Lng	FGM	FGA	Pct	XPM	XPA	Pct	KO	Avg	TB	Points
1987	NO	2	27	1	1	**100.0**	5	7	71.4	—	—	—	8
1988	SF	**16**	52	27	**38**	71.1	40	41	97.6	—	—	—	121
1989	SF	**16**	47	**29**	36	80.6	49	51	96.1	—	—	—	**136**
1990	SF	**16**	**56**	24	36	66.7	39	39	**100.0**	—	—	—	111
1991	SF	**16**	50	14	28	50.0	49	50	98.0	80	61.0	13	91
1992	SF	**16**	46	18	27	66.7	53	54	98.1	87	62.0	20	107
1993	SF	**16**	46	16	26	61.5	**59**	**61**	96.7	**92**	**64.0**	31	107
1995	IND	4	52	4	9	44.4	9	9	**100.0**	—	—	—	21
Career		102	56	133	201	66.2	303	312	97.1	259	62.0	64	702

=== Postseason ===
Year	Team	GP	Overall FGs				PATs			Kickoffs			Points
Year	Team	GP	Lng	FGM	FGA	Pct	XPM	XPA	Pct	KO	Avg	TB	Points
1988	SF	**3**	41	2	5	40.0	10	11	90.9	—	—	—	16
1989	SF	**3**	36	3	**6**	50.0	**15**	**17**	88.2	—	—	—	24
1990	SF	2	**47**	2	2	**100.0**	5	5	**100.0**	—	—	—	11
1992	SF	2	42	4	5	80.0	4	4	**100.0**	10	57.0	0	16
1993	SF	2	29	1	1	**100.0**	8	9	88.9	**12**	**59.0**	**4**	11
Career		12	47	12	19	63.2	42	46	91.3	22	58.0	4	78

== Racing career ==
In 1993, Cofer began racing in the NASCAR Featherlite Southwest Tour, running a race at Sears Point Raceway and finishing 39th after an oil pump failed. The following year, he began racing full-time in the series for JMC Enterprises, driving the No. 79 Chevrolet. Four races into the season, he won his first career race from the pole position at Stockton 99 Speedway, leading all 100 laps. He won two more poles at Saugus Speedway and Tucson Raceway Park, finishing fifth in the final points standings and winning the series' Rookie of the Year Award.

In 1995, Cofer was offered an invitation to compete in the newly formed SuperTruck Series presented by Craftsman, but turned it down to take the job as kickers coach with the Carolina Panthers. In 2002, Cofer ran three races in the Truck Series starting at Indianapolis Raceway Park, driving the No. 04 Ford F-150 for Quality Motorsports and finishing 33rd after his radiator failed. He ran another for the team at Phoenix International Raceway, starting 30th and finishing 21st, his best runs of the season. Cofer later joined Ware Racing Enterprises for the season-ending race at Homestead-Miami Speedway, driving the No. 5 Dodge Ram. After starting last, he finished 26th, the last car running.

== Motorsports career results ==
=== NASCAR ===
(key) (Bold – Pole position awarded by qualifying time. Italics – Pole position earned by points standings or practice time. * – Most laps led.)

==== Craftsman Truck Series ====
NASCAR Craftsman Truck Series results
Year	Team	No.	Make	1	2	3	4	5	6	7	8	9	10	11	12	13	14	15	16	17	18	19	20	21	22	NCTC	Pts	Ref
2002	Quality Motorsports	04	Ford	DAY	DAR	MAR	GTY	PPR	DOV	TEX	MEM	MLW	KAN	KEN	NHA	MCH	IRP; 33	NSH	RCH	TEX	SBO	LVS	CAL	PHO; 21		61st	249	
2002	Ware Racing Enterprises	5	Dodge																						HOM; 26	61st	249	
