= Mack Cleveland =

American politician

Mack N. Cleveland Jr.
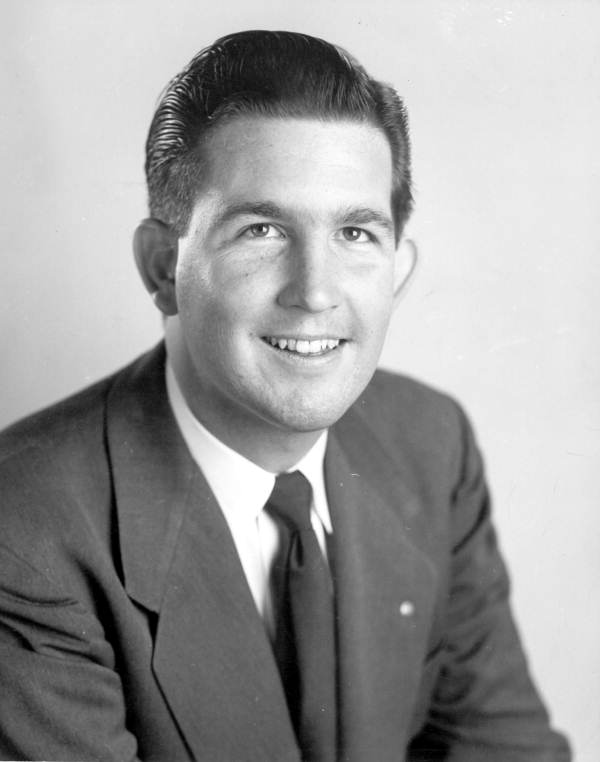

State Representative from Sanford (Seminole County), Florida
- In office 1953 – February 8, 1963 Serving with Gordon V. Frederick

Florida State Senator from Seminole County
- In office 1963–1965

Personal details
- Born: July 9, 1924 Sanford, Seminole County; Florida, US
- Died: October 17, 2010 (aged 86) Longwood, Seminole County, Florida
- Party: Democrat (later Republican)
- Spouse: Mary Anne Cleveland (married 1984-2010, his death)
- Children: Stepchildren: Darvin Boothe, Jr. Rebekah Boothe Corley Robert Boothe
- Education: Seminole High School University of Florida Stetson University
- Occupation: Attorney

Military service
- Allegiance: United States of America
- Branch/service: United States Army Air Corps; United States Air Force Reserve
- Years of service: 1947-1951 USAAC; 1951-1964 USAFR

Mack Norman Cleveland Jr. (July 9, 1924 – October 17, 2010), was an attorney and politician from Sanford, Florida, who served in the Florida State Legislature from 1953 to 1965.

== Education and military service ==
He graduated from Seminole High School in 1942 and attended the University of Florida before joining the United States Army Air Corps in the Pacific Theater during WWII. He was commissioned in the United States Air Force Reserve during the Korean Conflict. He earned a BS/BA from Stetson University in 1949 and JD from Stetson University College of Law in 1951.
