= Wild Arctic =

Former motion simulation attraction at SeaWorld parks

SeaWorld Orlando
- Status: Removed
- Opening date: May 24, 1995
- Closing date: March 15, 2020
- Replaced: Mission: Bermuda Triangle
- Replaced by: Expedition Odyssey

SeaWorld San Diego
- Status: Removed
- Opening date: May 10, 1997
- Closing date: January 10, 2020
- Replaced: Mission: Bermuda Triangle
- Replaced by: Arctic Rescue

Ride statistics
- Attraction type: Simulator ride
- Manufacturer: Reflectone, Inc.
- Model: Motion simulator
- Capacity: 1,416 riders per hour
- Vehicle type: Motion-based cabin
- Vehicles: 3 (SeaWorld Orlando); 4 (SeaWorld San Diego)
- Riders per vehicle: 59
- Rows: 6
- Riders per row: 9-10
- Audience capacity: 100 stationary seats per show
- Duration: 5:00
- Height restriction: 42 in (107 cm)
- Wheelchair accessible
- Must transfer from wheelchair
- Closed captioning available

Wild Arctic was a motion simulator attraction that operated at SeaWorld Orlando and SeaWorld San Diego. The attraction also featured animal exhibits featuring beluga whales, walruses, and harbor seals as a post-show. It replaced Mission: Bermuda Triangle at both parks.

The ride was manufactured by Reflectone and uses the same motion technology as commercial and military flight simulation training devices.

In December 2019, SeaWorld San Diego announced on its Instagram page that its Wild Arctic attraction's final day of operation would be January 10, 2020.

SeaWorld Orlando temporarily closed following March 15, 2020 due to the COVID-19 pandemic. When the park reopened in June 2020, Wild Arctic remained out of operation. The animal exhibits remained available to view, but the ride could not be accessed and never reopened.

The SeaWorld San Diego version of the ride was replaced in 2023 by Arctic Rescue, an Intamin launched roller coaster that retains the animal exhibit post-shows.

The SeaWorld Orlando version of the ride was replaced in 2025 by Expedition Odyssey, a flying theater attraction.

== Attraction summary ==
=== Queue and pre-show ===
Guests queued outside the Franklin Exploration Center, waiting to "board a helicopter" which took them to Base Station: Wild Arctic. The queue included numerous murals of Arctic wildlife, as well as screens that showed clips about the Arctic and its animals.

Once inside the building, guests were divided into groups "traveling by helicopter" (those who wanted to ride) or "traveling by foot" (those who wanted to view the film in a stationary viewing room with no movement). Guests who requested stationary seating were taken directly to a viewing room where they viewed the film and exited into the interactive animal exhibits.

Guests experiencing the ride were taken into the "pre-flight boarding station", where they watched a video in which the operations coordinator for the Franklin Exploration Center explained that the center is a support facility for Base Station: Wild Arctic, and that both facilities were founded by Thomas Purcell in 1937, who strived to have man survive in the Arctic climate to research the area. The coordinator further explained that guests would be traveling to Base Station: Wild Arctic in the White Thunder helicopter. Co-pilot Norm "Snowman" Miller, played by Rick Ducommun, would be interrupted by the helicopter's computer, which warned of a severe arctic storm incoming. The informative video would end, and guests boarded the ride vehicle.

During the San Diego iteration's later years, the pre-show was updated with a new pre-show describing the animals in the attraction.

=== Ride ===
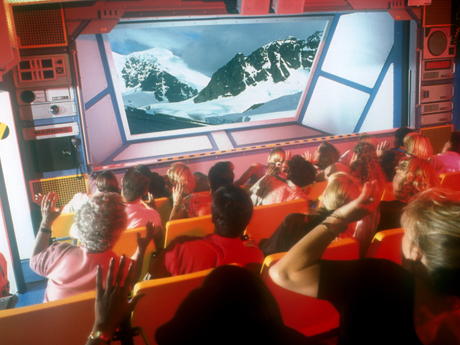
The SeaWorld San Diego iteration of the ride in 2010

Once guests were seated and secured by seat belts, the helicopter's pilot, Captain Emerson, departed and explained that he expected a short, comfortable flight to Base Station: Wild Arctic. Emerson flew the helicopter down to observe a polar bear family, before switching the helicopter into "dive mode" to dive underwater and see narwhals. After being brought above the water again, Emerson was warned by his computer that the incoming storm was approaching. Emerson landed the helicopter on a glacier to check radars, but the glacier began to break apart due to the weight of the craft. Emerson could not start the engine, and the helicopter became caught in a rockslide before the engine was started and it narrowly evaded destruction. The computer systems failed, and Emerson decided to use a shortcut to Base Station: Wild Arctic to avoid the storm. This led to the helicopter becoming caught in an avalanche until Emerson piloted through a narrow cavern to escape. The jet then arrived at Base Station: Wild Arctic, and Emerson thanked guests and bid them farewell to explore the research station. Guests would then disembark the ride vehicles and enter the animal exhibits.

=== Post-show ===
Guests enter Base Station: Wild Arctic, which is an Arctic research station built around two historical sailing ships which have become trapped in ice. Several marine mammal enclosures can be viewed, from both above and underwater, primarily consisting of beluga whales, Pacific walruses, and harbor seals. There are also multiple interactive cameras, informational games, and other activities scattered throughout the station. Sections of the walk-through exhibit feature man-made dripping "ice" walls for guests to touch, made to simulate walking through an actual ice cavern. Most of the indoor areas are chilled to near-freezing temperatures to further add to the Arctic immersion. After viewing the exhibits, guests exit into a gift shop.

Until the mid-2010s, polar bears were part of the exhibits. SeaWorld Orlando's last remaining polar bear died in 2014, and one of two polar bears at SeaWorld San Diego was sent to the Pittsburgh Zoo & Aquarium for breeding in early 2017. SeaWorld San Diego's last remaining polar bear died in 2017 as well. With no remaining polar bears, both parks opted not to continue featuring the animals. The polar bears' enclosures were repopulated with southern sea otters at SeaWorld San Diego, and Magellanic penguins at SeaWorld Orlando.

== Gallery ==
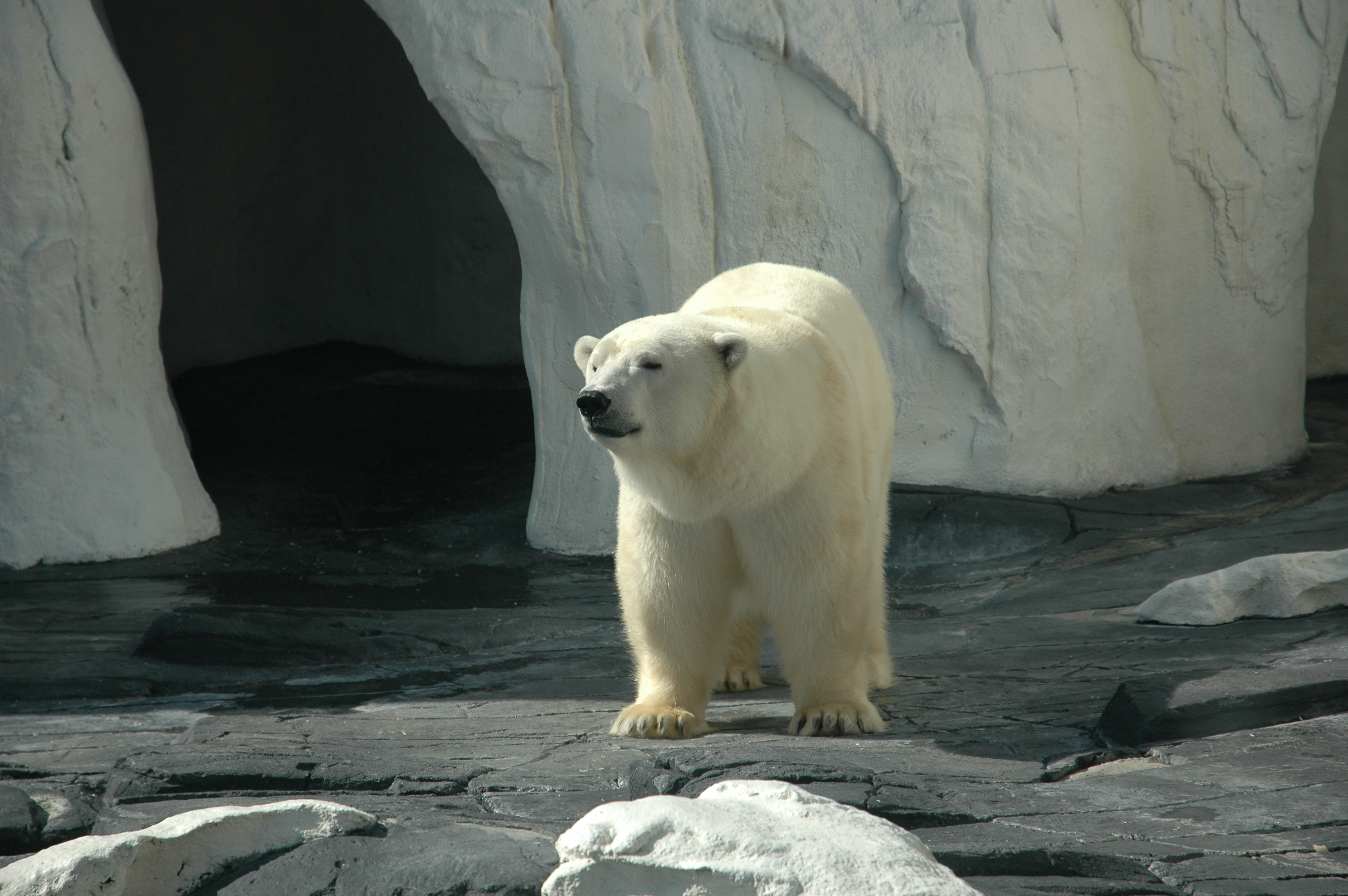
A polar bear

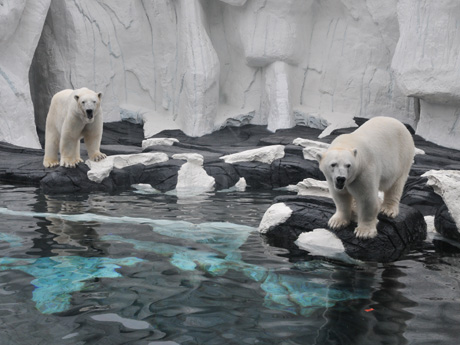
Two polar bears

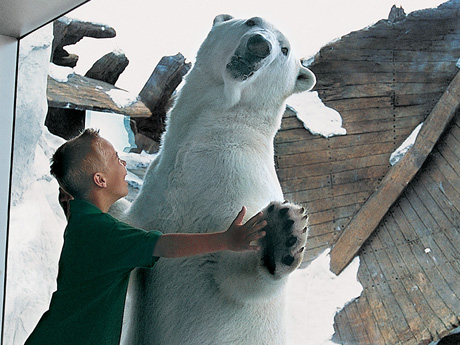
A visitor interacting with a polar bear

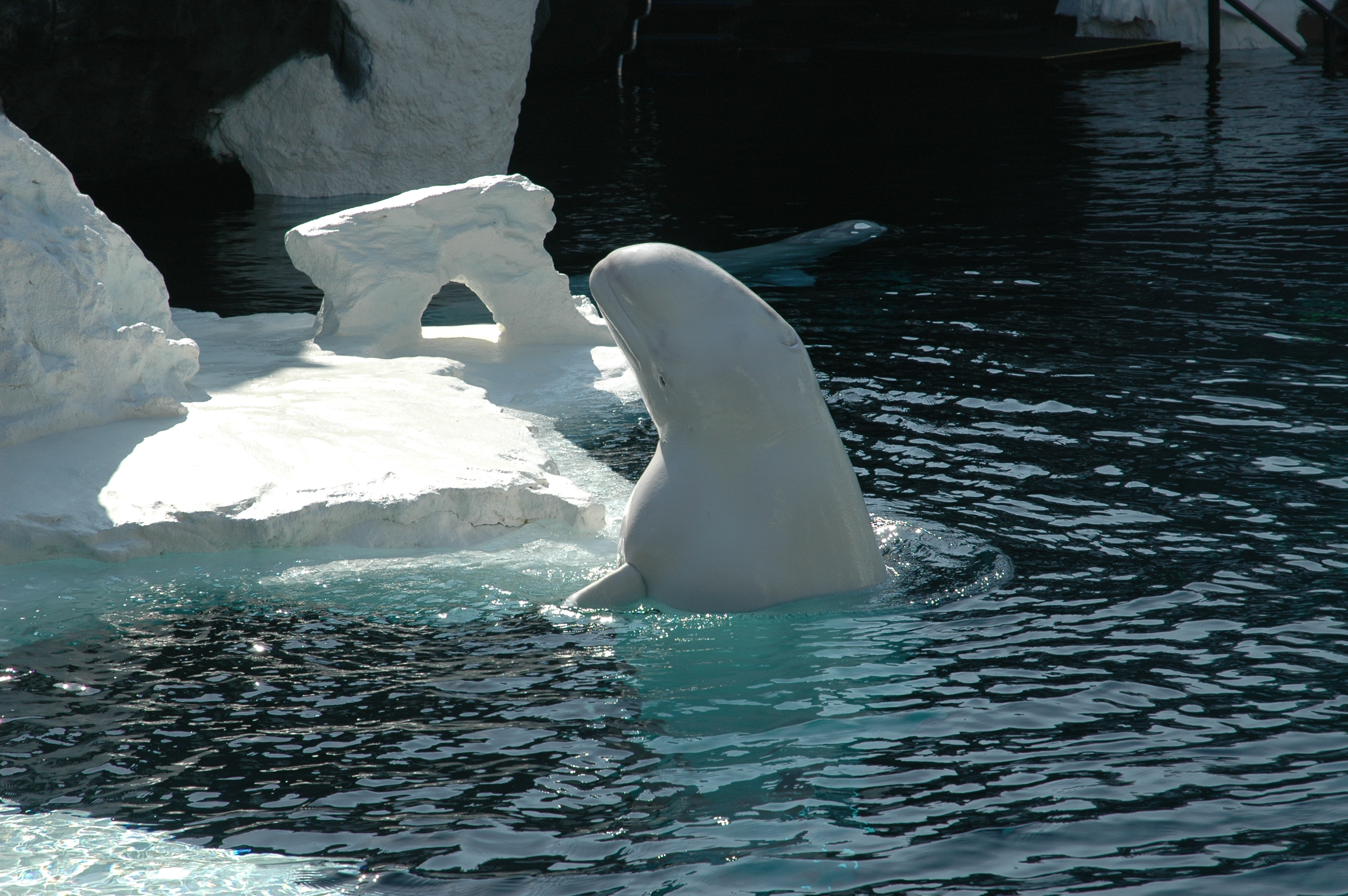
A beluga whale surfacing

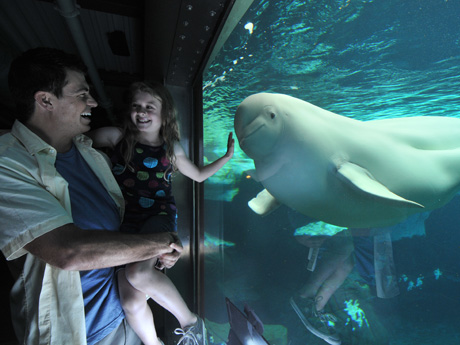
A beluga whale underwater
