= The Bachelor (American TV series) season 14 =

Season of American television series

The Bachelor
- Season 14
- Promotional poster
- Starring: Jake Pavelka
- Presented by: Chris Harrison
- No. of contestants: 25
- Winner: Vienna Girardi
- Runner-up: Tenley Molzahn
- No. of episodes: 10 (including 2 specials)

Release
- Original network: ABC
- Original release: January 4 – March 1, 2010

Additional information
- Filming dates: October 16 – November 26, 2009

Season chronology
- ← Previous; Season 13 Next → Season 15

The Bachelor: On the Wings of Love is the fourteenth season of ABC reality television series The Bachelor. The season premiere aired on January 4, 2010. The show features 31-year-old Jake Pavelka, a pilot from Dallas, Texas, courting 25 women.

Pavelka finished in seventh place on season 5 of The Bachelorette featuring Jillian Harris. It is the first season of The Bachelor to be broadcast in high definition. The season concluded on March 1, 2010, with Pavelka choosing to propose to 23-year-old marketing rep Vienna Girardi. The couple ended their engagement in June 2010.

== Contestants ==
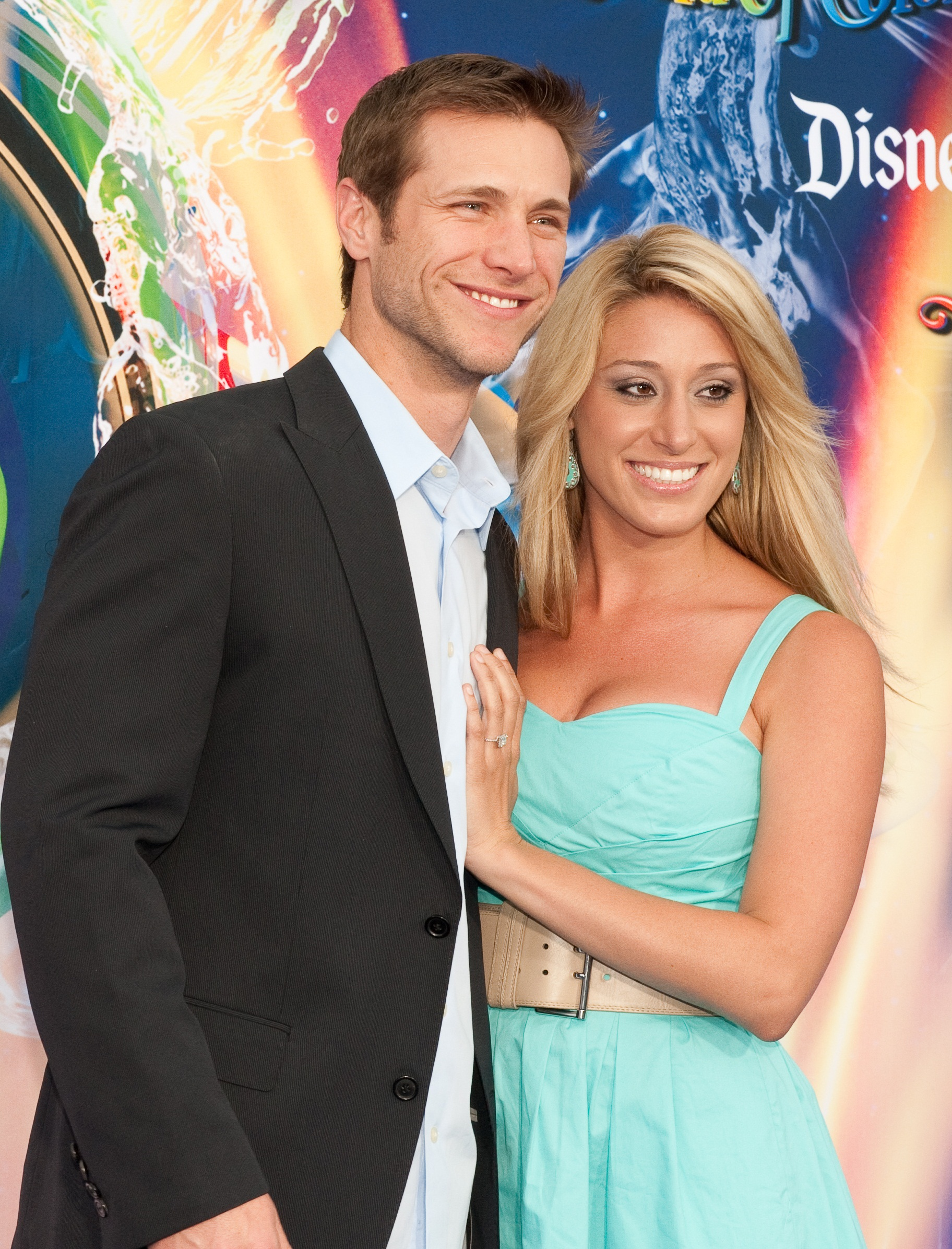
Jake Pavelka and then-fiancée Vienna Girardi in the premiere of World of Color at Disney California Adventure Park in 2010

Biographical information according to ABC official series site, plus footnoted additions

Name	Age	Hometown	Occupation	Outcome	Place
Vienna Girardi	23	Geneva, Florida	Marketing Representative	Winner	1
Tenley Molzahn	25	Newberg, Oregon	College Admissions	Runner-Up	2
Gia Allemand	26	Manorville, New York	Swimsuit Model	Week 7	3
Ali Fedotowsky	25	Williamstown, Massachusetts	Advertising Account Manager	Week 6	4 (quit)
Corrie Adamson	23	Kissimmee, Florida	Wardrobe Consultant	Week 5	5
Ashleigh Hunt	25	North Potomac, Maryland	Account Manager	Week 4	6–7
Jessica "Jessie" Sulidis	25	Oakville, Ontario	Cosmetic Sales Manager	Week 4	6–7
Kathryn Sherlock	25	Lexington, Kentucky	Corporate Flight Attendant	Week 4	8
Ella Nolan	30	La Follette, Tennessee	Hair Stylist	Week 4	9
Elizabeth Kitt (NE)	29	Imperial, Nebraska	Nanny	Week 3	10–11
Valishia Savage	32	San Bernardino, California	Homemaker	Week 3	10–11
Michelle Kujawa	26	Anaheim, California	Office Manager	Week 3	12
Ashley Elmore	29	Pittsburgh, Pennsylvania	Teacher	Week 2	13–14
Christina McCasland	25	Encinitas, California	Restaurant Manager	Week 2	13–14
Rozlyn Papa	28	Richmond, Virginia	Model/Make-Up Artist	Week 2	15 (DQ)
Alexa "Lex" McAllister	25	Galloway, Ohio	Entrepreneur	Week 1	16–25
Caitlyn McCabe	24	Winfield, Illinois	Spokesmodel	Week 1	16–25
Channy Choch	29	Santa Rosa, California	Mortgage Loan Officer	Week 1	16–25
Elizabeth Kreft (D.C.)	29	Union, Kentucky	Captain, Air National Guard	Week 1	16–25
Emily Harkins	23	West Chester, Ohio	Fit Model	Week 1	16–25
Kimberly Sullivan	24	Norman, Oklahoma	NBA Dancer	Week 1	16–25
Kirsten Pittman	25	Aurora, Colorado	Waitress	Week 1	16–25
Sheila Lidner	25	Scottsdale, Arizona	Commercial Pilot	Week 1	16–25
Stephanie Mueller	24	Morris, Illinois	Dance Teacher	Week 1	16–25
Tiana Kruzel	31	Calgary, Alberta	Medical Technician	Week 1	16–25

=== Future appearances ===
==== Dancing with the Stars ====
Jake Pavelka competed in the tenth season of Dancing with the Stars. He partnered with Chelsie Hightower and finished in 7th place.

==== The Bachelorette ====
Ali Fedotowsky was chosen as the bachelorette for the sixth season of The Bachelorette.

==== Bachelor Pad ====
Runner-up Tenley Molzahn, along with contestants Gia Allemand, Ashley Elmore, Elizabeth Kitt, Michelle Kujawa and Jessie Sulidis, returned for the inaugural season of Bachelor Pad. Michelle was eliminated in week 1, Jessie in week 2, Gia in week 3, and Ashley in week 5. Elizabeth and her partner, Jesse Kovacs, were eliminated at the beginning of week 6, finishing in 3rd place. Tenley and her partner, Kiptyn Locke, were eliminated at the end of week 6, finishing as the runners-up.

Jake, Gia, Vienna Girardi, and Ella Nolan, returned for the second season of Bachelor Pad. Gia quit in week 2, and Jake was eliminated in week 3. Ella and her partner, Kirk DeWindt, were eliminated at the beginning of week 6, finishing in 4th place. Vienna and her partner, Kasey Kahl, were eliminated at the end of week 6, finishing in 3rd place.

==== Bachelor in Paradise ====
Season 1

Michelle returned for the inaugural season of Bachelor in Paradise. She quit in week 1.

Season 2

Tenley returned for the second season of Paradise. She broke up with Joshua Albers in week 6.

==== Other appearances ====
Outside of the Bachelor Nation franchise, Tenley and Michelle appeared as contestants in the Bachelors vs. Bachelorettes special on the season 7 of Wipeout.

== Call-out order ==
Order	Bachelorettes	Week							
Order	Bachelorettes	1	2	3	4	5	6 (Note: In week 6, Ali decided to quit the competition, cancelling the upcoming rose ceremony. The remaining three contestants are listed in alphabetical order.)	7	8
1	Rozlyn	Tenley	Ali	Vienna	Gia	Tenley	Gia; Tenley; Vienna	Tenley	Vienna
2	Emily	Ella	Elizabeth (NE)	Ella	Tenley	Ali	Gia; Tenley; Vienna	Vienna	Tenley
3	Ali	Elizabeth (NE)	Vienna	Gia	Ali	Gia	Gia; Tenley; Vienna	Gia	
4	Jessie	Ali	Gia	Corrie	Corrie	Vienna	Ali	Ali	
5	Tenley	Vienna	Tenley	Tenley	Vienna	Corrie			
6	Ella	Christina	Ella	Ali	Ashleigh H. Jessie				
7	Kathryn	Gia	Valishia	Jessie	Ashleigh H. Jessie				
8	Caitlyn	Ashley E.	Corrie	Kathryn	Kathryn				
9	Elizabeth (D.C.)	Rozlyn	Jessie	Ashleigh H.	Ella				
10	Alexa	Jessie	Ashleigh H.	Elizabeth (NE); Valishia					
11	Vienna	Corrie	Michelle	Elizabeth (NE); Valishia					
12	Corrie	Valishia	Kathryn	Michelle					
13	Kimberly	Ashleigh H.	Ashley E. Christina						
14	Valishia	Kathryn	Ashley E. Christina						
15	Gia	Michelle	Rozlyn (Note: Rozlyn was disqualified for having an inappropriate relationship with a show's producer.)						
16	Elizabeth (NE)	Alexa; Caitlyn; Channy; Elizabeth (D.C.); Emily; Kimberly; Kirsten; Sheila; Stephanie; Tiana							
17	Channy	Alexa; Caitlyn; Channy; Elizabeth (D.C.); Emily; Kimberly; Kirsten; Sheila; Stephanie; Tiana							
18	Ashley E.	Alexa; Caitlyn; Channy; Elizabeth (D.C.); Emily; Kimberly; Kirsten; Sheila; Stephanie; Tiana							
19	Tiana	Alexa; Caitlyn; Channy; Elizabeth (D.C.); Emily; Kimberly; Kirsten; Sheila; Stephanie; Tiana							
20	Christina	Alexa; Caitlyn; Channy; Elizabeth (D.C.); Emily; Kimberly; Kirsten; Sheila; Stephanie; Tiana							
21	Ashleigh H.	Alexa; Caitlyn; Channy; Elizabeth (D.C.); Emily; Kimberly; Kirsten; Sheila; Stephanie; Tiana							
22	Kirsten	Alexa; Caitlyn; Channy; Elizabeth (D.C.); Emily; Kimberly; Kirsten; Sheila; Stephanie; Tiana							
23	Stephanie	Alexa; Caitlyn; Channy; Elizabeth (D.C.); Emily; Kimberly; Kirsten; Sheila; Stephanie; Tiana							
24	Sheila	Alexa; Caitlyn; Channy; Elizabeth (D.C.); Emily; Kimberly; Kirsten; Sheila; Stephanie; Tiana							
25	Michelle	Alexa; Caitlyn; Channy; Elizabeth (D.C.); Emily; Kimberly; Kirsten; Sheila; Stephanie; Tiana							

The contestant received the first impression rose
The contestant received a rose during the date
The contestant was eliminated
The contestant was eliminated during the date
The contestant quit the competition
The contestant received a rose during the date but disqualified from the competition
The contestant moved on to the next week by default
The previously eliminated contestant asked for a chance to return the competition but denied
The contestant won the competition

== Episodes ==
No. overall	No. in season	Title	Original release date	Prod. code	U.S. viewers (millions)	Rating/share (18–49)
119	1	"Week 1"	January 4, 2010	1401	9.54	3.3/8
There were no dates during the first week. Jake starts his quest for finding love in Los Angeles. Memorable moments include Ashley's stewardess costume. Jillian and Ed of The Bachelorette came to the mansion prior to the rose ceremony answering questions for the ladies. Tenley received the first impression rose and 10 ladies were sent home in the first rose ceremony.
120	2	"Week 2"	January 11, 2010	1402	10.50	3.6/9
Group date: Corrie, Christina, Valishia, Gia, Rozlyn, and Ashleigh. They took part in an InStyle magazine photo shoot. At the party, they were sent to Shangri-La Hotel in Santa Monica. Rozlyn receives a rose. One-on-one date: Ali. Jake takes her in a private airplane to Palm Springs and drives them to an open field having a dinner and dancing to music performed by Chicago. She receives a rose. Group date: Elizabeth (NE), Vienna, Ashley, Kathryn, and Jessie. The night before the date, Michelle threatened to leave the mansion since her name has not been on the date list, displaying bad behavior and she got very upset. The next day, they were taken to Six Flags Magic Mountain to have their fun at the amusement park. Elizabeth (NE) got a rose and watched fireworks with Jake. Other developments: In the middle of the cocktail party, Chris asks Rozlyn to talk outside. It was brought to Chris's attention that Rozlyn had an inappropriate relationship with one of the show's staffers and told her the staffer has been fired. The remainder of the cocktail party was cut short, ending during Jake's conversation with Christina. Rozlyn gives her rose back with only now two safe roses (Ali and Elizabeth (NE)). During "The Women Tell All" episode, she explained that she had trouble contacting her child and the staffer had supported her and allowed her to use his phone.
121	3	"Week 3"	January 18, 2010	1403	10.66	3.8/9
One-on-one date: Vienna. They take on a helicopter to San Gabriel Mountains for a bungee jump off the bridge. She receives a rose. Group date: Corrie, Elizabeth (NE), Ali, Jessie, Michelle, Ashleigh, Tenley and Kathryn. They visit the comedy club in Hollywood. Jon Lovitz is asked to perform for the Bachelorettes a stand up comedy routine. Michelle is eliminated before the date is over, Jake not agreeing that her behavior wasn't acceptable. One-on-one date: Ella. They go on a helicopter ride San Diego SeaWorld and she receives a pleasant surprise – her son, because Ella celebrated her birthday. Jake, Ella and her son spend the day together. She receives a rose. Cocktail party: All of the ladies. Elizabeth (NE) backstabbed Vienna her see a rose being given during a 1 on 1 date.
122	4	"Week 4"	January 25, 2010	1404	11.47	3.9/10
Located in: Various locations in central coast of California; At the start of the episode, Chris Harrison tells the remaining ladies that they will be living in RV for their trip across the coast. One-on-one date: Gia. They are taken to a beautiful winery in Santa Ynez. She receives a rose. Group date: Corrie, Ali, Ashleigh, Jessie, Tenley and Vienna. They traveled to Pismo Beach for a wild day of dune buggying and sandsurfing. Jake talks Tenley about her relationship with her ex-husband and she receives the rose. Two-on-one date: Ella and Kathryn. They take travel to Big Sur for an outdoor dinner. Neither got a rose and both of them were sent home, this has been the first time in The Bachelor history that no one receives a rose during a two-on-one date. Other developments: The rose ceremony's location at Villa Montalvo in Saratoga. Jake has a shocking difficult decision to eliminate only one person after already eliminated two people during a two-on-one date. Like the previous season, the Bachelorette eliminated two people at the rose ceremony instead of one with one rose taken away. As a result, the leading man eliminated Jessie and Ashleigh with Vienna given the last rose.
123	5	"Week 5"	February 1, 2010	1405	11.73	4.1/10
Located in: San Francisco; One-on-one date: Tenley. They went to Chinatown, and wrote messages on fortune cookies. Then, they had dinner at the top of Coit Tower. Tenley made it clear that she had traditional values about marriage and that she had only slept with her ex-husband. Tenley's previous marriage was obviously still affecting her during this date. Two-on-one date: Gia and Vienna. They went to Castello di Amorosa in Napa Valley for an overnight stay and they had dinner together. After they went to their separate rooms, Vienna snuck into Jake's room to spend some extra time with him. One-on-one date: Corrie. They went to Golden Gate Park and California Academy of Sciences. Jake discovered that Corrie was a virgin. One-on-one date: Ali. Since Ali was from San Francisco took charge and she showed him the entire city of San Francisco.
124	6	"Week 6: Hometowns"	February 8, 2010	1406	12.35	4.1/10
Located in: Hometowns (dates) and Los Angeles (rose ceremony); Hometown Visits: Gia – New York, New York; Ali – Williamstown, Massachusetts; Tenley – Newberg, Oregon; Vienna – Sanford, Florida. Gia and Jake toured New York City where they look pictures of sight-seeing locations together, including the Statue of Liberty and modeling poses. Ali and Jake visited her deceased grandmother's home. Tenley took Jake to the dance academy where she first learned how to dance. Vienna and Jake took a boat ride on a swampy river. At the turn of the dramatic events, there was no rose ceremony and Ali left the competition early so she would not lose her job.
125	7	"Week 7: Fantasy Suites"	February 15, 2010 (Note: Week 7 and Week 8: The Women Tell All were aired during the 2010 Winter Olympics.)	1407	11.53	4.1/10
Located in: Saint Lucia; Jake spends a night in the 'fantasy suite' with each of the final three contestants. Presumably he has intercourse with each of them which may have made it difficult for viewers to maintain friendly feelings towards Jake (especially as he asks Gia to leave at the rose ceremony and Tenley had only ever slept with her ex-husband). Gia and Jake go to a groove on Saint Lucia streets, Tenley and Jake took a helicopter ride on overlooking the island and have a plunge. Vienna and Jake rode a ship famously from Pirates of the Caribbean film series. Before the rose ceremony, Ali received a phone call and asked Jake to give another chance with him and Jake declined the offer. At the rose ceremony, Jake gives the roses to Tenley and Vienna, eliminating Gia.
126	8	"The Women Tell All"	February 22, 2010	N/A	11.27	3.9/10
127	9	"Week 8: Season Finale"	March 1, 2010	1408	15.15	5.3/14
Located in: Saint Lucia; Jake introduces Tenley and Vienna to his family at Jalousie Bay, they meet with Jake's parents, two brothers and sisters-in-law. Having only one last chance date to select one to be his wife. Jake's family likes Vienna, with his mom and sisters-in-law, both approving of Tenley and Vienna. Jake and Vienna frolick in the mud at the hot springs. While Jake and Tenley snorkeled on a charter boat. Jake comes to his decision: he selects Vienna, leaving Tenley heartbroken.
128	10	"After the Final Rose"	March 1, 2010	N/A	13.91	5.3/14

== Post-show ==
=== After the Final Rose ===
This is the special episode that airs after every finale. In season 14's segment, Jake told Chris Harrison about Bachelor Pad, Ali was chosen as the next bachelorette in the sixth season of The Bachelorette. Jake and Vienna were seen in a public appearance as a couple. Jeffrey Osborne sang "On the Wings of Love" at the closing of the show.

In June 2010, several months after their engagement, it was announced that Jake and Vienna Girardi had split.

=== Deaths ===
==== Gia Allemand ====
On August 14, 2013, third-place contestant Gia Allemand died after a reported suicide attempt. Several contestants and Pavelka expressed their condolences via Twitter, with Pavelka saying, "I am in complete shock and devastated to hear the news about Gia. She was one of the sweetest people I have ever known. And a very dear friend. My heart goes out to her family during this very difficult time. We have lost an angel today. I miss you Gia...".

==== Alexa McAllister ====
On 16 February 2016, Alexa (Lex) McAllister died after an apparent suicide attempt in Columbus, Ohio, as reported by TMZ. Per E! News, the local police said that on 13 February, they'd received a call in which it was claimed that McAllister had overdosed on prescription drugs. While McAllister was in a stable condition on her way to Grant Medical Center, E! News got access to a police report, which stated that she had taken "a lot" of pills. Her family took her off life support after her health began to deteriorate. McAllister was 31. Pavelka tweeted his condolences on Twitter, "I'm so sad to hear about Alexa. Such a beautiful girl. My heart breaks for her family. Covering them in prayer during this rough time".

== Jake Pavelka ==
Jake Pavelka grew up in Denton, Texas, and attended University of North Texas and Embry-Riddle Aeronautical University. In his free time, he takes dancing lessons, woodworking, and has fun flying acrobatic planes and he is also a former child actor. Pavelka is an airline pilot, and took his first flying lessons at 12 years old. He also became a certified flight instructor when he was 23 years old.

Pavelka became a member of an ABC reality show for the third time when he appeared as a celebrity contestant on the tenth season of Dancing with the Stars. Partnered with Chelsie Hightower, he was the fifth competitor eliminated on April 27, 2010.
