= Tenley =

Tenley may refer to:

== Places ==
- Tenley Campus, satellite campus of American University in Washington, D.C.
- Tenley Circle, traffic circle in Washington, D.c.
- Tenley Park, park in Everett, Pennsylvania

== People ==
- Tenley (given name), including a list of people with the given name
