= Mission: Bermuda Triangle =

Former motion simulation attraction at SeaWorld parks

Misson Bermuda Triangle

SeaWorld Orlando
- Status: Removed
- Opening date: May 1992
- Closing date: 1995
- Replaced by: Wild Arctic

SeaWorld San Diego
- Status: Removed
- Opening date: 1994
- Closing date: 1997
- Replaced by: Wild Arctic

Six Flags Worlds of Adventure
- Area: Wildlife Section
- Status: Removed
- Opening date: 2000
- Closing date: 2003

Ride statistics
- Attraction type: Simulator ride
- Model: Motion simulator
- Theme: Mystery of Bermuda Triangle
- Capacity: 1,416 riders per hour
- Vehicle type: Motion-based cabin
- Vehicles: 3 (Orlando); 4 (San Diego)
- Riders per vehicle: 59
- Rows: 6
- Riders per row: 9-10
- Audience capacity: 100 stationary seats per show
- Duration: 5:00
- Height restriction: 42 in (107 cm)
- Wheelchair accessible
- Must transfer from wheelchair

Mission: Bermuda Triangle was a motion simulator attraction that operated at SeaWorld Orlando, SeaWorld San Diego, and SeaWorld Ohio (later Six Flags Worlds of Adventure). The ride was themed to the legend and mystery of the Bermuda Triangle. The attraction was replaced by Wild Arctic at SeaWorld Orlando and SeaWorld San Diego.

== Plot ==
The voyage began as a scientific submarine expedition to observe and document marine life before receiving a call from a sister submarine claiming to have made an incredible discovery. Descending about a mile deep, the protagonist submarine finds the lost wreck of the USS Cyclops (briefly mentioned in the pre-show), and the captain of the protagonist submarine, voiced by Robert Stack, agrees to stay on-site while the sister submarine returns to the surface to refuel. An earthquake suddenly rocks the sea, forcing the submarine to evade falling debris, before the wreck tips over and falls into the trench, its wake current dragging the submarine down with it. As the engines fail and the hull begins to strain under the increasing water pressure, a mysterious electric charge gathers along the hull of USS Cyclops before blasting the sub, which suddenly rockets back towards the surface. Unable to explain the strange phenomena that saved them, the captain chalks it up to yet another mystery of the Bermuda Triangle as a helicopter arrives to retrieve the submarine.

== History ==
In 1989, Anheuser-Busch purchased the SeaWorld parks from Hartcourt-Bruce Janovich for $1.1 billion. Busch wanted to transform the parks from zoos and aquarium to amusement parks to compete in the market against nearby parks. In 1992, SeaWorld Orlando announced plans for a simulator attraction named Mission: Bermuda Triangle. The ride opened during the 1992 Memorial Day weekend. SeaWorld San Diego's version of the attraction opened in 1994.

In August 1994, SeaWorld Orlando announced that Mission: Bermuda Triangle would be rethemed to Wild Arctic, which opened in 1995. SeaWorld San Diego followed in 1997, also retheming their Mission: Bermuda Triangle to Wild Arctic. Wild Arctic added animal exhibits at the exit of the motion simulators.

In 1999, SeaWorld Ohio announced plans to install Mision: Bermuda Triangle, which opened in 2000. When it was added, it was the only ride at SeaWorld Ohio, as the park was forbidden to add most amusement rides because of its location next to Six Flags Ohio. In 2001, SeaWorld Ohio merged with Six Flags Ohio to become Six Flags Worlds of Adventure, with the former SeaWorld Ohio attractions becoming known as an area called Wildlife Section.

In March 2004, Six Flags Worlds of Adventure was sold to Cedar Fair for $145 million, and reverted it back to the park's first name, Geauga Lake. Mission: Bermuda Triangle, along with the other attractions in the Wildlife Section, were replaced by the Wildwater Kingdom water park in 2005.
