= Tenley (given name) =

- Gender: unisex

Origin
- Origin: English
- Meaning: “burned clearing”

Tenley is a given name of English origin that is a transferred use of an English place name and surname that refers to a clearing or meadow that has been burned.

The name was among the top one thousand names for girls in the United States between 2010 and 2019. Its popularity coincided with the appearance on the television program The Bachelorette by Tenley Molzahn. The name has also been associated with American figure skater Tenley Albright. Two-syllable surname names and names with a -lee or -ley ending are currently fashionable for American girls. Spelling variants of the name, including Tenlee, Tenleigh, and Tennley, are also well-used for girls in the United States.

== Women ==
- Tenley Albright (born 1935), American former figure skater, Olympian, and surgeon
- Tenley Molzahn (born 1984), American dancer and television personality
