= Arctic Rescue =

Roller coaster at SeaWorld San Diego

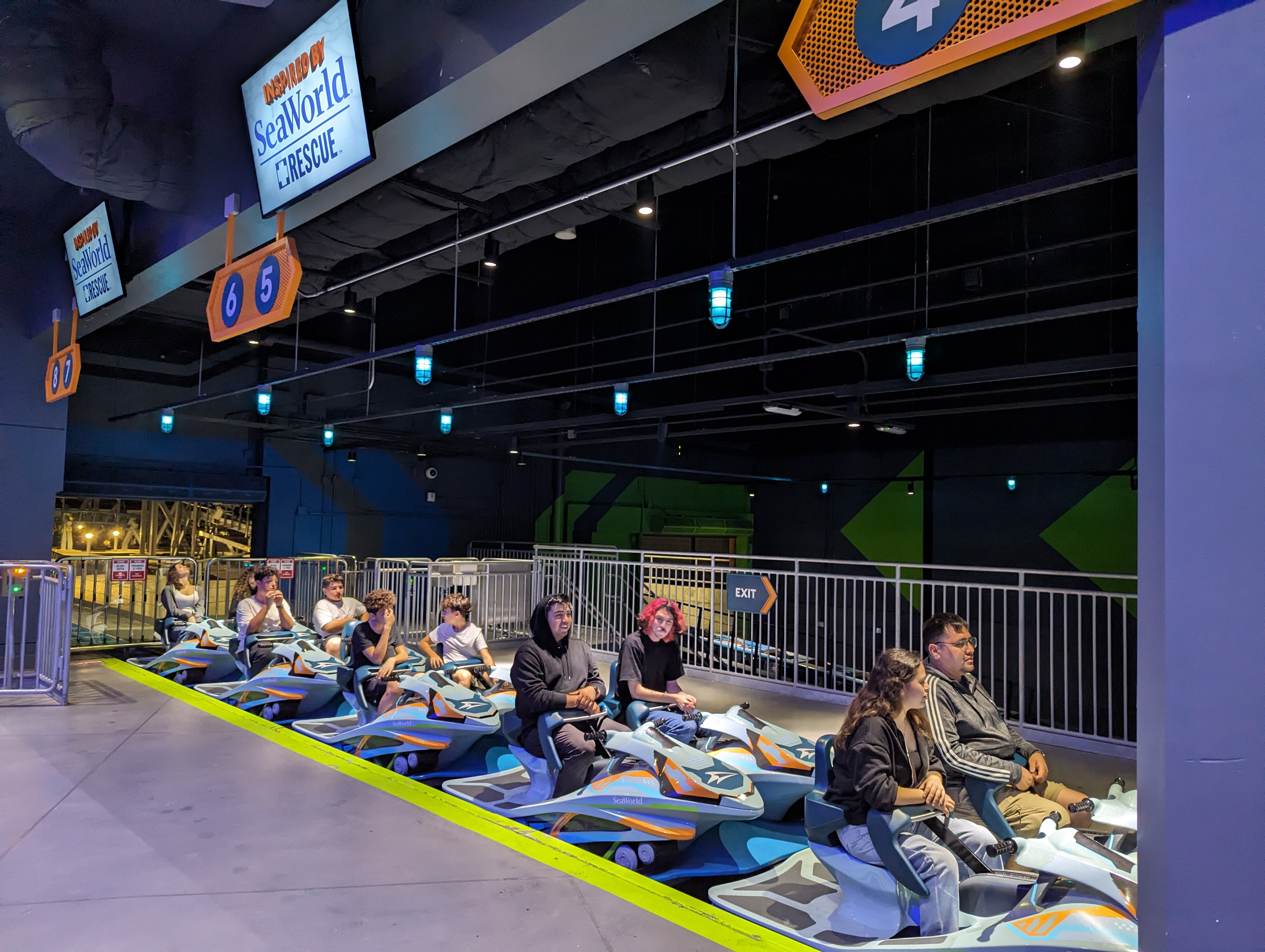
- Train in station

SeaWorld San Diego
- Location: SeaWorld San Diego
- Coordinates: 32°45′55″N 117°13′21″W
- Status: Operating
- Opening date: June 2, 2023

General statistics
- Type: Steel
- Manufacturer: Intamin
- Lift/launch system: Tire propelled launch
- Length: 2,800 ft (850 m)
- Speed: 40 mph (64 km/h)
- Duration: 1:15
- Height restriction: 48 in (122 cm)
- Trains: 8 cars; riders arranged 2 across in a single row for a total of 16 riders per train
- Website: Official site
- Arctic Rescue at RCDB

Arctic Rescue is a launched straddle steel roller coaster at SeaWorld in San Diego, California. The ride's layout features three launches and reaches a top speed of 40 mph (64 km/h). The theme of the coaster intends to raise awareness of climate change in the Arctic and the challenges Arctic animals face. Manufactured by Intamin, the trains are styled like snowmobiles.

== History ==
SeaWorld announced the addition of Arctic Rescue on September 27, 2022. The coaster opened on June 2, 2023. The opening included a partnership with the Alaska SeaLife Center, where riders could learn about Alaska's wildlife inside the queue.
