= Tenley Molzahn =

American dancer

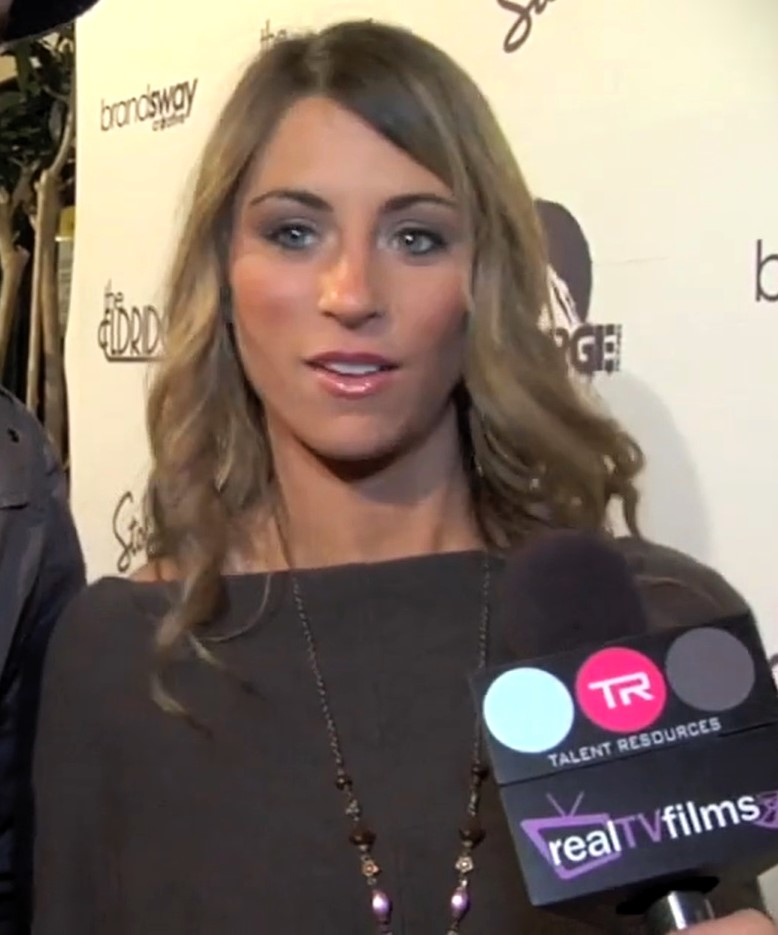
- Molzahn in 2011
- Born: Tenley Nora Molzahn; May 19, 1984 (age 42); Newberg, Oregon, U.S.
- Spouses: Ryan Natividad (div. 2009) Taylor Leopold (m. 2018)
- Modeling information
- Hair color: dark brown
- Website: www.sweetandfreelife.com

Tenley Nora Molzahn Leopold (née Molzahn; born May 19, 1984) is an American dancer and television personality known for her appearances as a cast member on three ABC reality shows, The Bachelor: On the Wings of Love (2010), Bachelor Pad (2010), and Bachelor in Paradise (2015).

== Dancing ==
In 2002, Molzahn moved to Los Angeles to audition for Walt Disney Productions. For the next six years, Molzahn danced and performed in Disney in Anaheim and Japan, taking the lead role of Ariel in Tokyo Disney’s ‘Under the Sea’ tour for nine months.

== Television ==
Molzahn's work in television began when she was selected as a cast member on ABC's reality show The Bachelor series which first aired on January 4, 2010. The show placed her with twenty-four other women all contending for the affection of pilot Jake Pavelka. She was the last one eliminated by Pavelka.

Afterwards, Molzahn joined the cast of Bachelor Pad, the ABC dating-based competition reality TV show in which former contestants from The Bachelor and The Bachelorette compete and play games for a chance at a $250,000 cash prize. The show premiered August 9, 2010 on ABC.

== Personal life ==
Prior to appearing on The Bachelor, Molzahn had been married to Ryan Natividad. They divorced in 2009.

On January 12, 2018, Molzahn became engaged to Taylor Leopold, whom she had been dating for two years. They were married on April 27, 2018. They have two children, born in September 2020 and May 2024.
