= SeaWorld San Diego =

Theme park in San Diego, California

- Previously known as SeaWorld of California and SeaWorld Adventure Park
- Interactive map of SeaWorld San Diego
- Location: 500 Sea World Drive, San Diego, California, United States
- Coordinates: 32°45′57″N 117°13′38″W
- Status: Operating
- Opened: March 21, 1964; 62 years ago
- Owner: United Parks & Resorts
- Operated by: United Parks & Resorts
- General manager: Jim Lake
- Theme: Ocean Adventure and Exploration
- Slogan: Real. Amazing.
- Operating season: Year Round
- Attendance: 3.5 million (2022)
- Area: 189 acres (76 ha)

Attractions
- Total: 16
- Roller coasters: 5
- Water rides: 2
- Website: SeaWorld San Diego

SeaWorld San Diego is a theme park in Mission Bay Park in San Diego, California. It is a marine mammal park, oceanarium, public aquarium, and marine animal rehabilitation center. It opened in 1964 as the first theme park in the SeaWorld chain. Both the park and the chain are owned and operated by United Parks & Resorts.

SeaWorld San Diego is a member of the Association of Zoos and Aquariums (AZA). Adjacent to the property is the Hubbs-SeaWorld Research Institute, which conducts marine biology research and provides educational and outreach programs on marine issues to the general public.

== History ==
SeaWorld was founded in 1964 by Milton Shedd, Ken Norris, David Demott and George Millay. The four graduates of UCLA originally set out to build an underwater restaurant and marine life show. When the underwater restaurant concept was deemed unfeasible, they scrapped those plans and decided to build a park instead, and SeaWorld San Diego was opened on March 21, 1964. With only a few dolphins, sea lions, 6 attractions and 22 acres (8.9 ha), the park proved to be a success and more than 400,000 guests visited in the first 12 months.

The second SeaWorld location, SeaWorld Ohio, opened in 1970, followed by SeaWorld Orlando in 1973. Harcourt Brace Jovanovich, Inc. (HBJ) purchased the company in 1976 and SeaWorld San Antonio later opened in 1988. The Anheuser-Busch Company then purchased the SeaWorld parks in 1989 and put them into its Busch Entertainment division. In 2008, Anheuser-Busch was purchased by Belgian-Brazilian brewer InBev. InBev had a reputation as a cost-cutting company that was not interested in holding non-beverage businesses, and the Busch Entertainment division was later sold to the Blackstone Group in 2009. The company was renamed SeaWorld Parks & Entertainment in December 2009. In 2013, Blackstone shortened the company's name to SeaWorld Entertainment and sold 37% of it in an initial public offering. In 2024, SeaWorld Entertainment changed its name to United Parks & Resorts.

== Attractions ==
=== Shows ===
Shows operate with seasonal changes and include:

- Orca Encounter: a live show highlighting the park's killer whales and various aspects of their lives, biology, and adaptations. Post-2015, the show focuses less on physical entertainment with the trainers and more on showcasing the animals themselves.
- Dolphin Adventures (previously named "Dolphin Days"): explaining the whale and dolphin family.
- Flippers, Facts, and Fun: a new educational presentation featuring California sea lions.
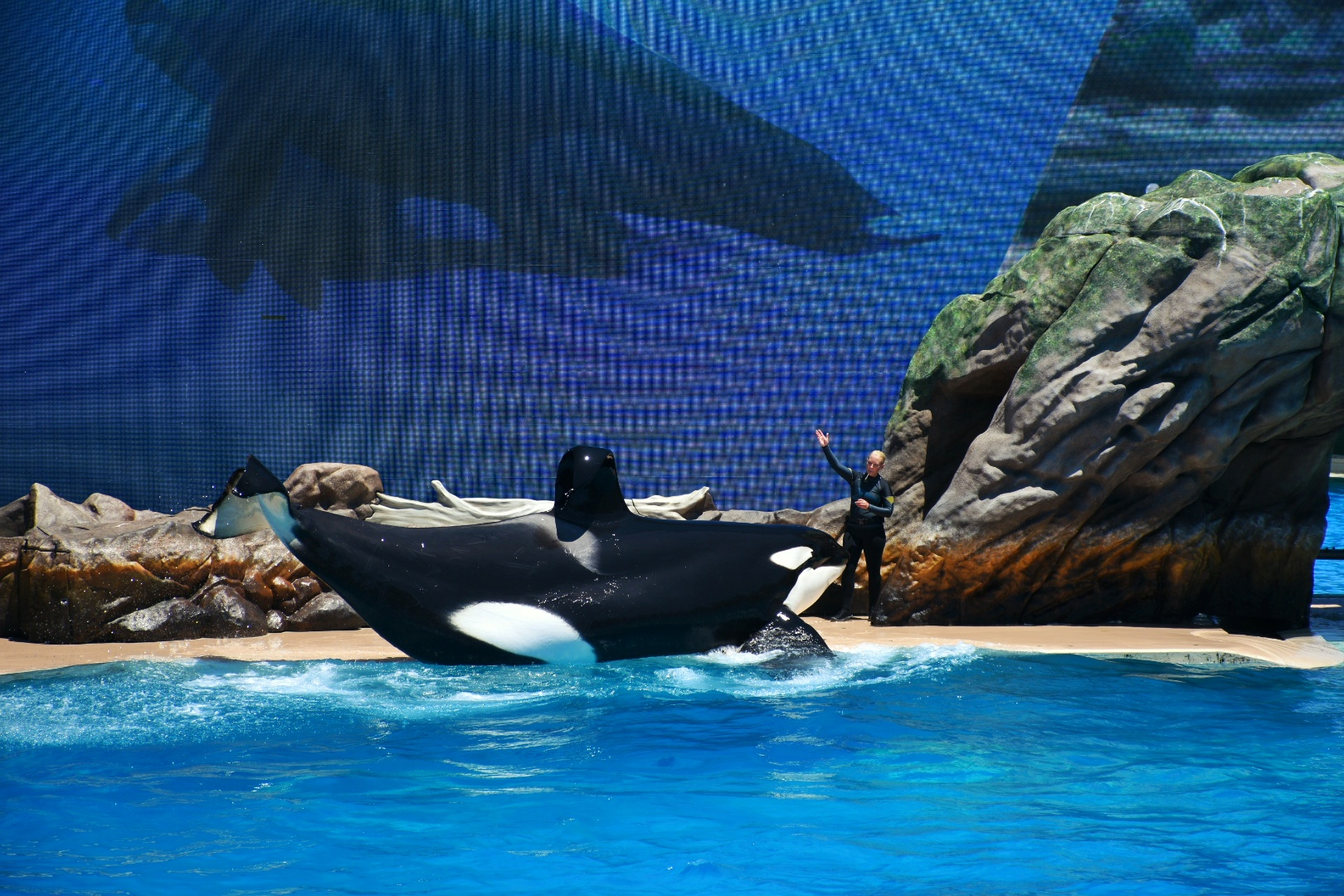
Orca Encounter

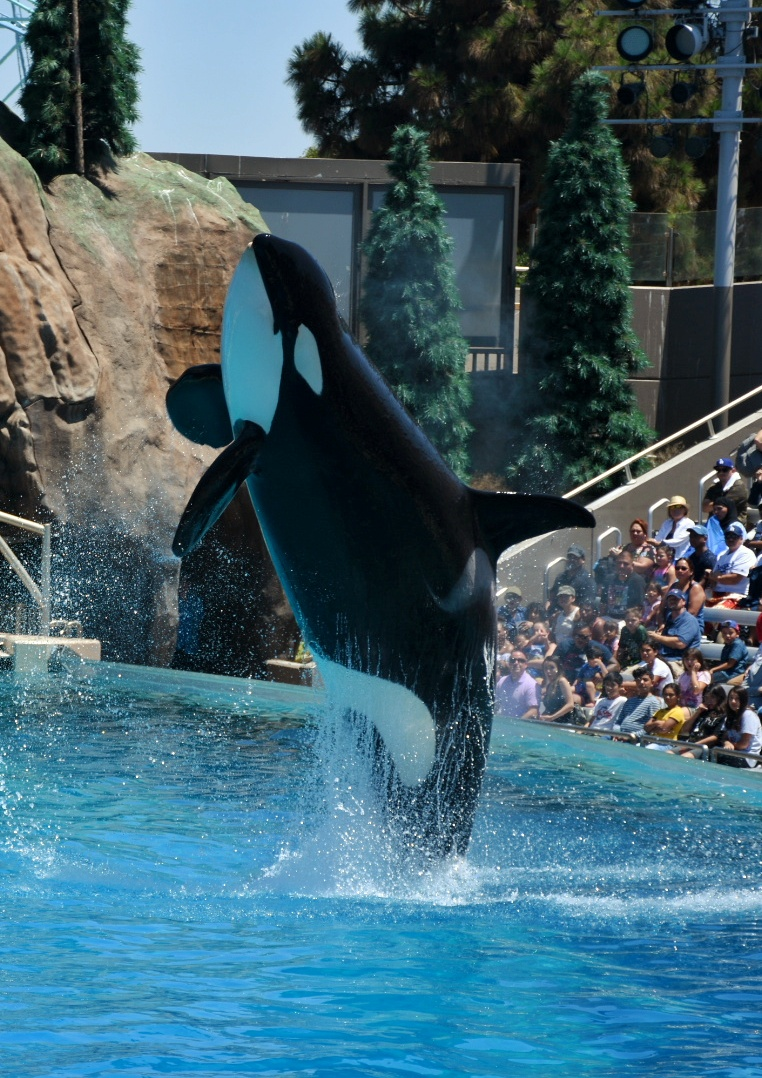
Orca Encounter

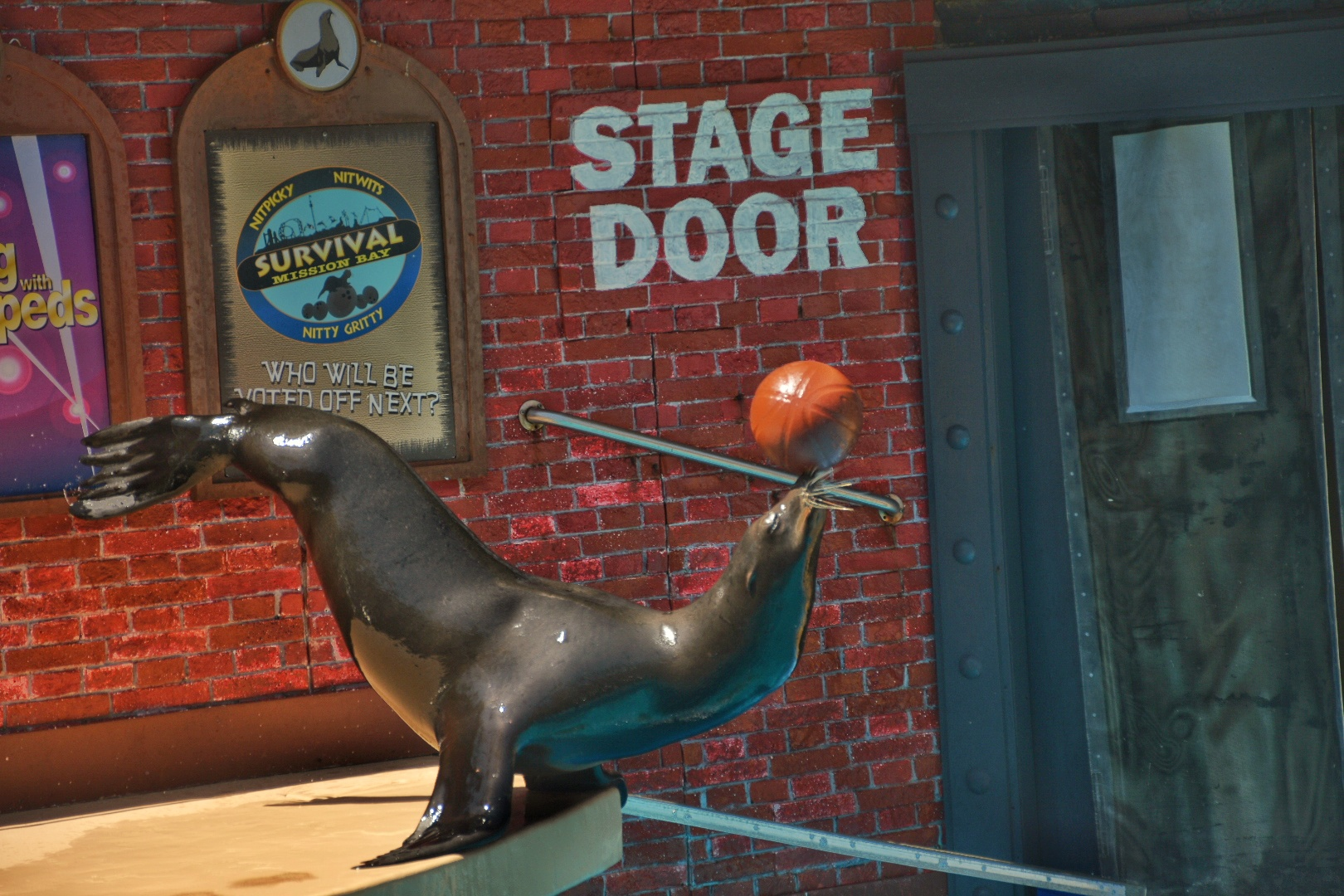
Sea Lions Live

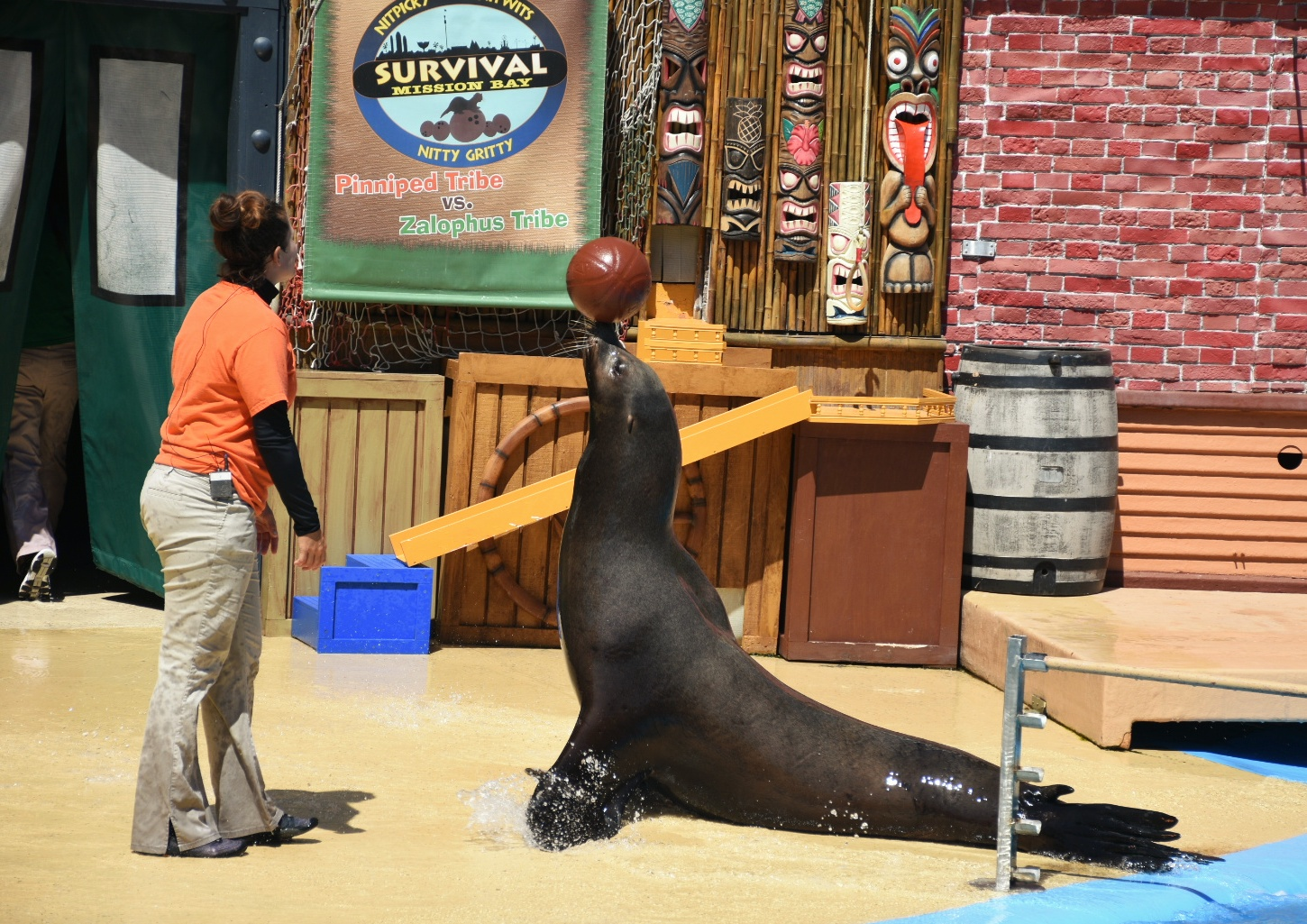
Sea Lions Live

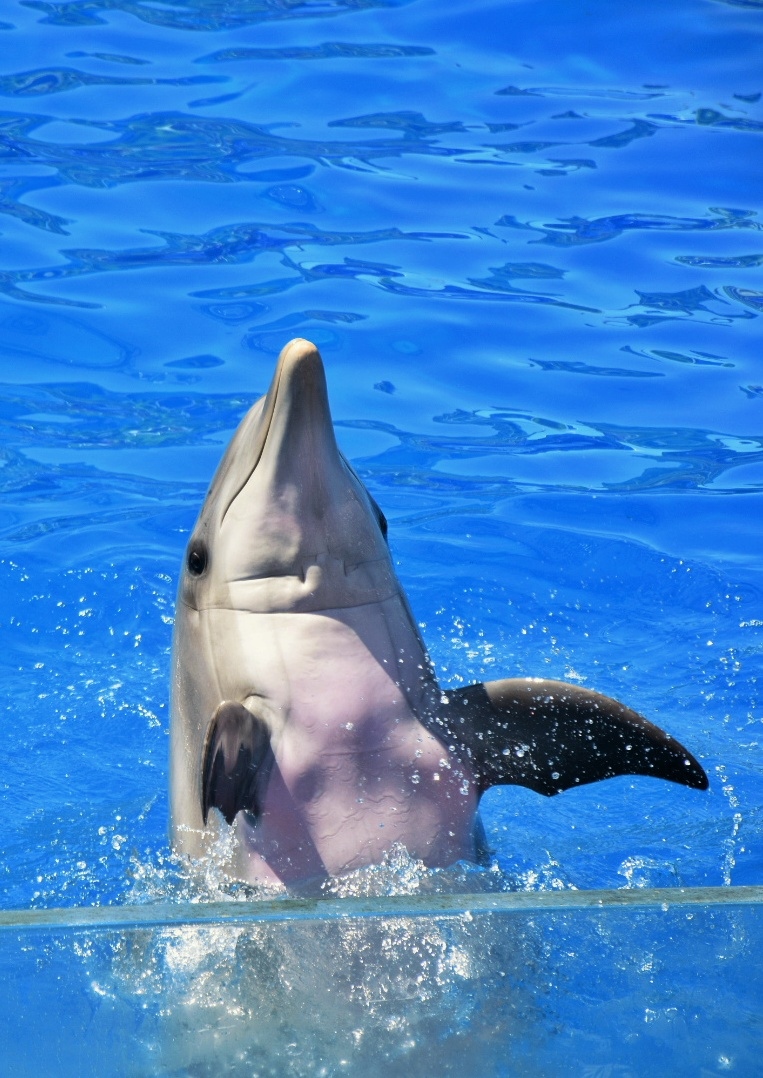
Dolphin Adventures

=== Rides ===
==== Bayside Skyride ====
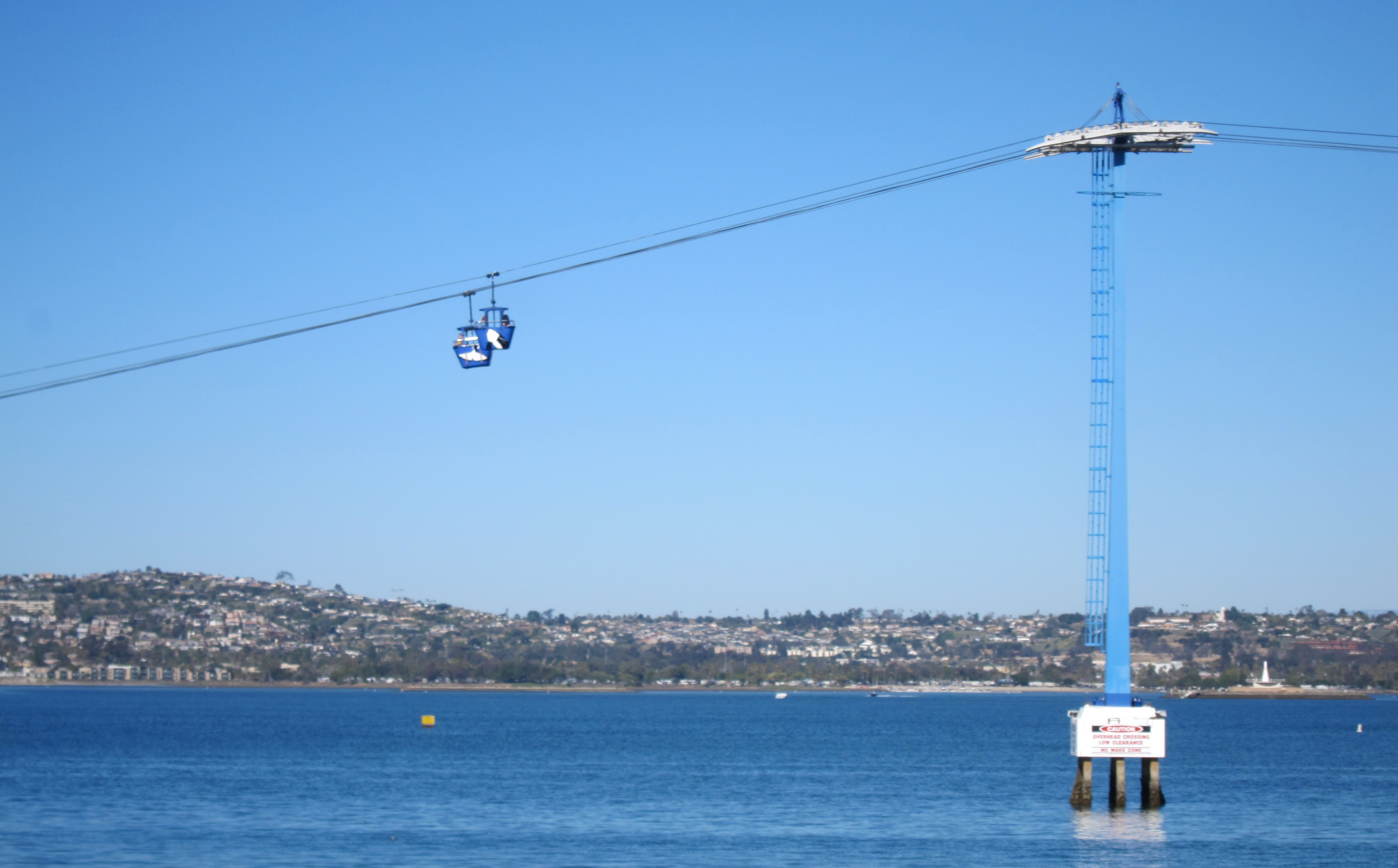
Bayside Skyride gondola ride with views of Mission Bay.

The Bayside Skyride is a gondola ride that first opened in 1967. The ride travels along a stretch of wire over Mission Bay.

==== Ocean Explorer ====
Ocean Explorer, designed for children, launched on May 27, 2017. It comprises three attractions: Octarock, a swinging experience, Sea Dragon Drop, a scaled-down drop tower, and Tentacle Twirl, a wave swing ride with a jellyfish theme.

The realm originally featured Submarine Quest, an outdoor people mover-like ride with indoor segments, themed around deep sea exploration. The attraction would receive negative reviews due to lackluster theming. Due to this, it quietly closed indefinitely in 2019. SeaWorld staff initially indicated that Submarine Quest had been temporarily closed for maintenance, but by May 2019, references to the ride had been removed from SeaWorld's maps and website. When the park re-opened on April 13, 2021, demolition of the ride track and show buildings began, leaving the animal enclosures intact.

==== Riptide Rescue ====
Riptide Rescue is a Huss Airboat ride, featuring 12 gondolas themed as rescue boats.

==== Rescue Jr. ====
Rescue Jr. is an interactive children's play area, which originally opened in 2008 as Sesame Street's Bay of Play and closed in April 2023. The re-themed area focuses on Sea Rescue and aquatic sea-life. It includes three rides: Tidepool Twist, a spinning teacup attraction; Rescue Riders, an attraction in the style of Dumbo the Flying Elephant; and Rescue Rafter, a raft themed Tug Boat ride.

==== Shipwreck Rapids ====
Shipwreck Rapids is an Intamin river rapids ride themed as a shipwreck on a deserted island.

==== Skytower ====
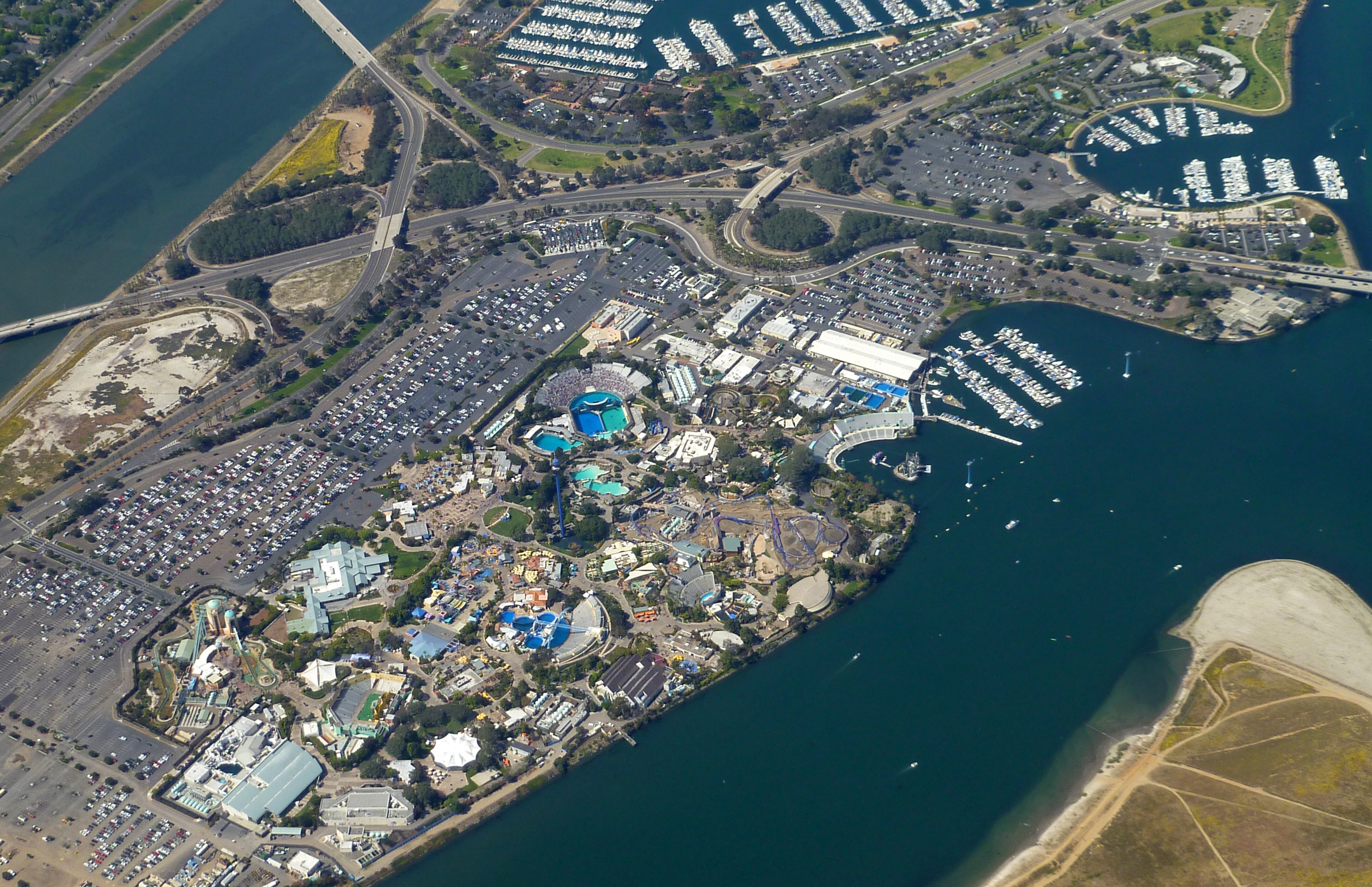
Aerial photo of the park from 2012, with the blue Skytower shown in the center.

Skytower is a 320-foot (98 m) gyro tower that was built in 1968 by Sansei Yusoki. The ride gives passengers a six-minute view of SeaWorld and San Diego via rising at a rate of 150 feet per minute (46 m/min) while spinning slowly (1.02 rpm).

==== Tentacle Twirl ====
Tentacle Twirl, opened on May 31, 2017, is a Wave Swinger built by German manufacturer Zierer.

=== Roller coasters ===
==== Arctic Rescue ====
Arctic Rescue is an Intamin launched coaster that opened on June 2, 2023. This family coaster features arctic theming, as well as the fastest and longest straddle roller coaster on the west coast of the United States. This new attraction replaced the Wild Arctic simulator ride, which closed on January 11, 2020. Arctic Rescue has 3 launches, reaching a high speed of 40 mph (64 km/h), and has a track length of 2,800 ft (850 m), and its straddle seating imitates the feeling of riding a snowmobile.

==== Electric Eel ====
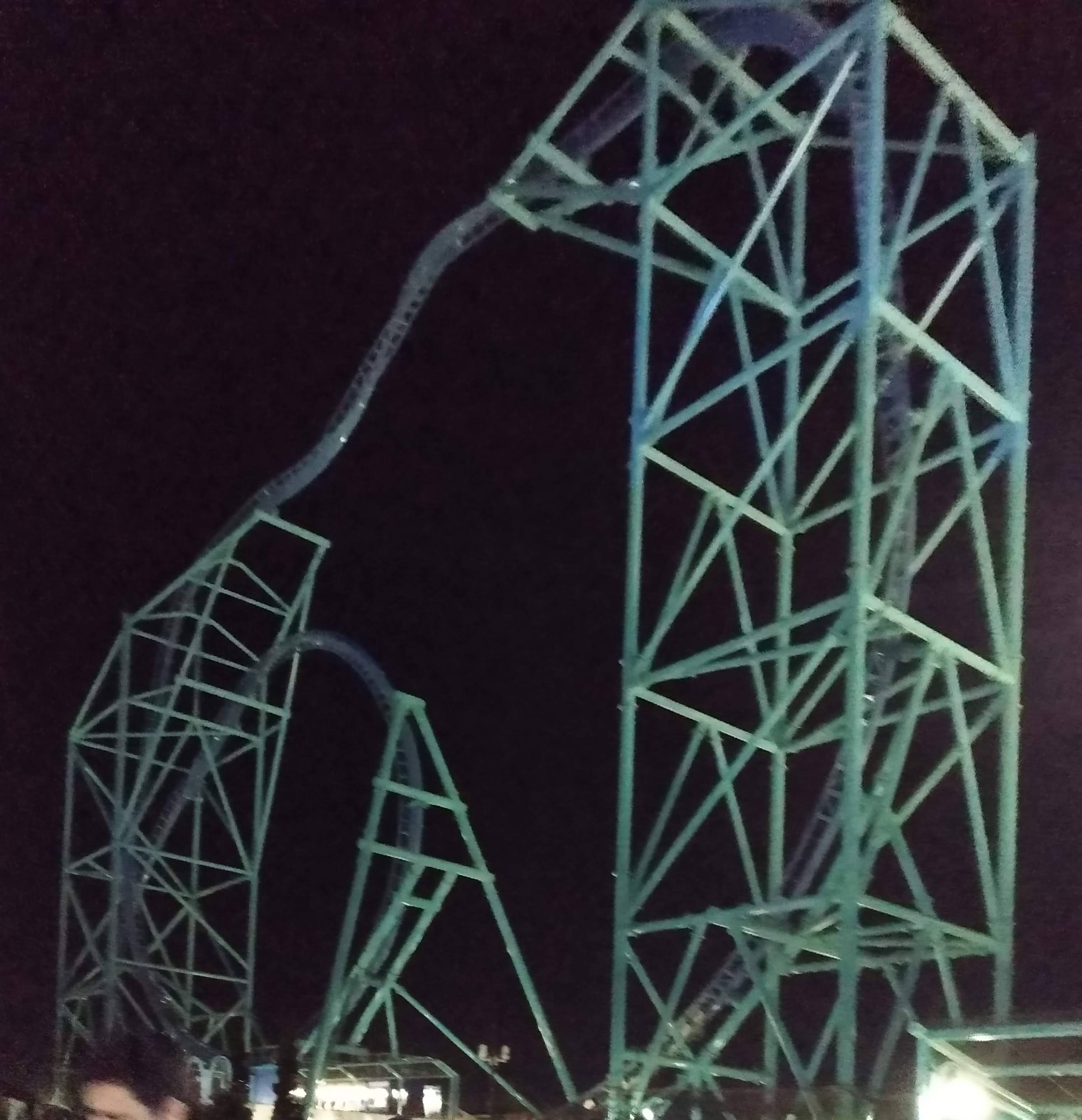
Electric Eel at night

Opened on May 10, 2018, Electric Eel is a Sky Rocket II model by Premier Rides. Electric Eel stands at 150 ft (46 m) tall, with a track length of 853 feet (260 m) and speeds of up to 62 mph (100 km/h).

==== Journey to Atlantis ====
Journey to Atlantis is a Mack Rides water coaster that was built in 2004. The ride stands at a height of 95 ft (29 m) and hits a max speed of 42 mph (68 km/h).

==== Emperor ====
Emperor is a Dive Coaster manufactured by Bolliger & Mabillard. With a height of 153 ft (47 m), Emperor is the tallest, fastest, and longest dive coaster in California. The ride contains 2,411 ft (735 m) of track, an Immelmann loop that stands at a height of 143 ft (44 m) and has a 90 degree drop that reaches speeds of over 60 mph (97 km/h). The ride opened on March 12, 2022.

==== Manta ====
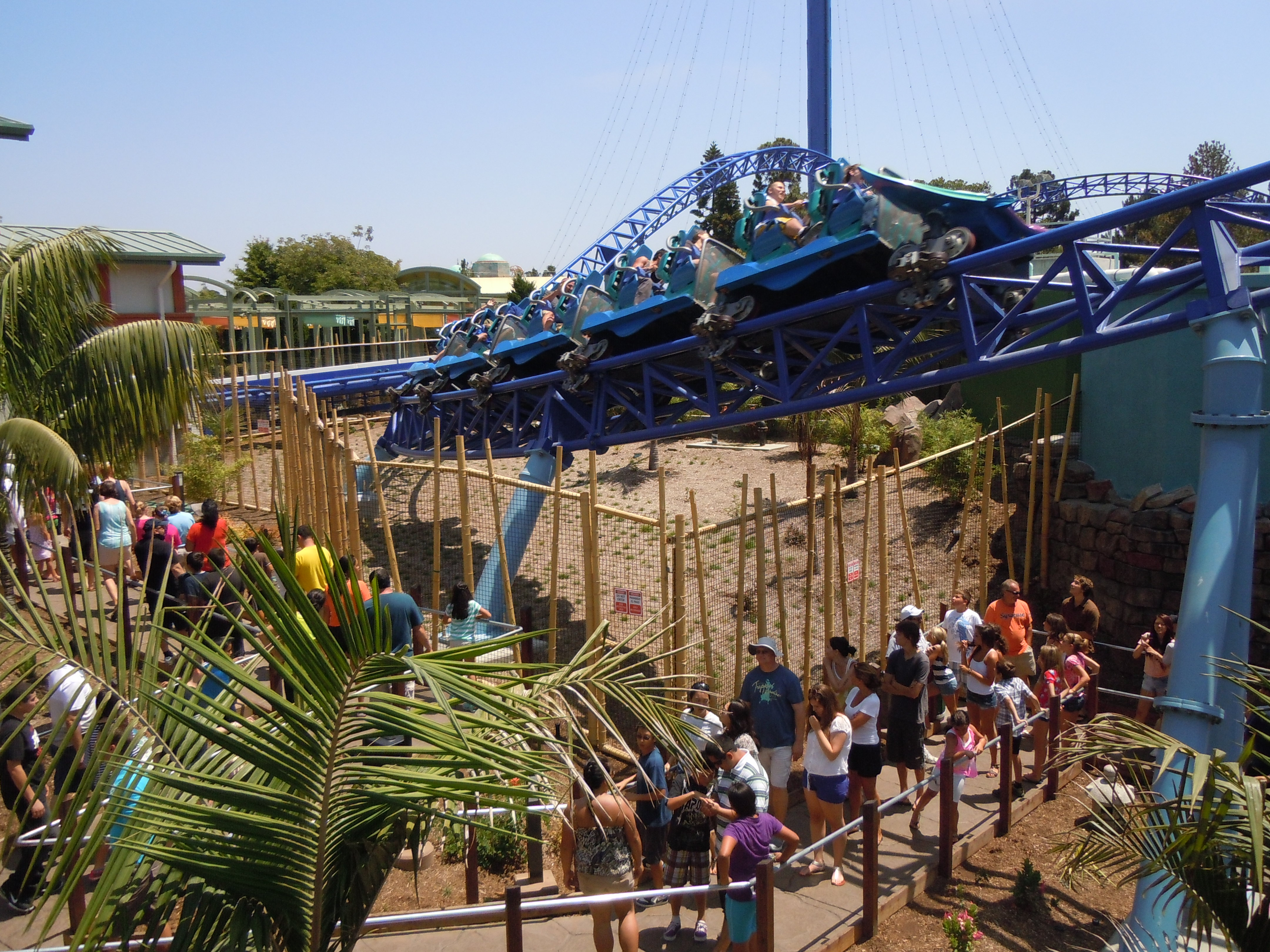
Manta roller coaster at SeaWorld San Diego

On May 26, 2012, SeaWorld San Diego opened a new mega-attraction called Manta, a Mack launched roller coaster featuring two launches LSM of up to 43 mph (69 km/h) accompanied by a bat ray aquarium and shallow touch pool for touching bat rays, white sturgeons, and shovelnose guitarfish. The two-minute, 2,800 ft (850 m) long ride stands at a height of 30 ft (9.1 m) and features a drop of 54 ft (16 m).

==== Tidal Twister ====
Tidal Twister, opened on May 24, 2019, was a Skywarp Horizon model by Skyline Attractions. The ride reached a top speed of 30 mph (48 km/h), with a height of 22 ft (6.7 m) and a track length of 320 ft (98 m). In late 2023, the ride was shut down and removed a few months later.

== Animal exhibits ==
=== Orcas ===
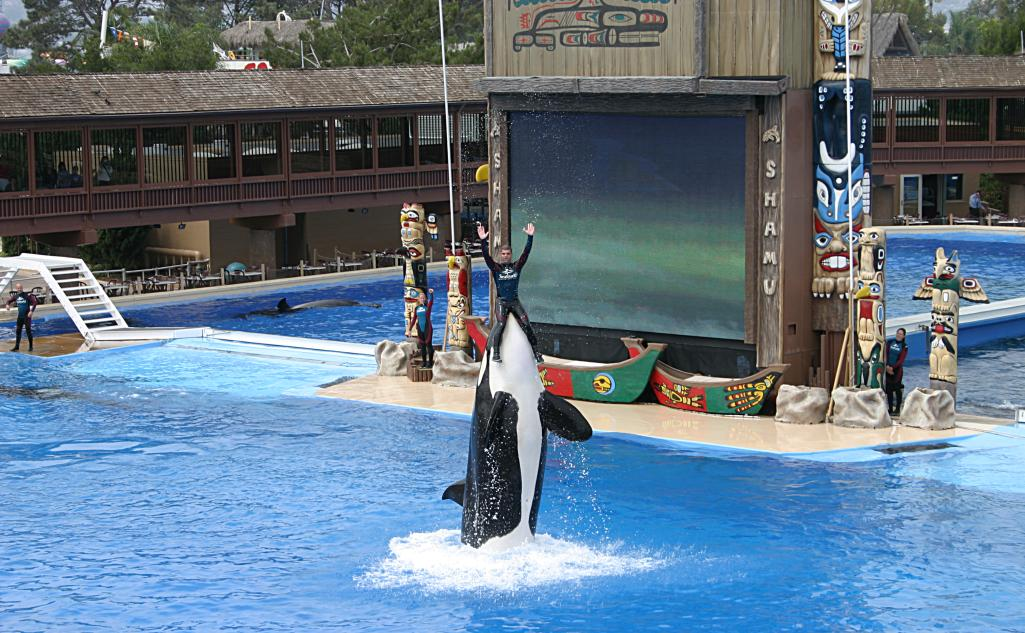
Kasatka performing "The Shamu Adventure"

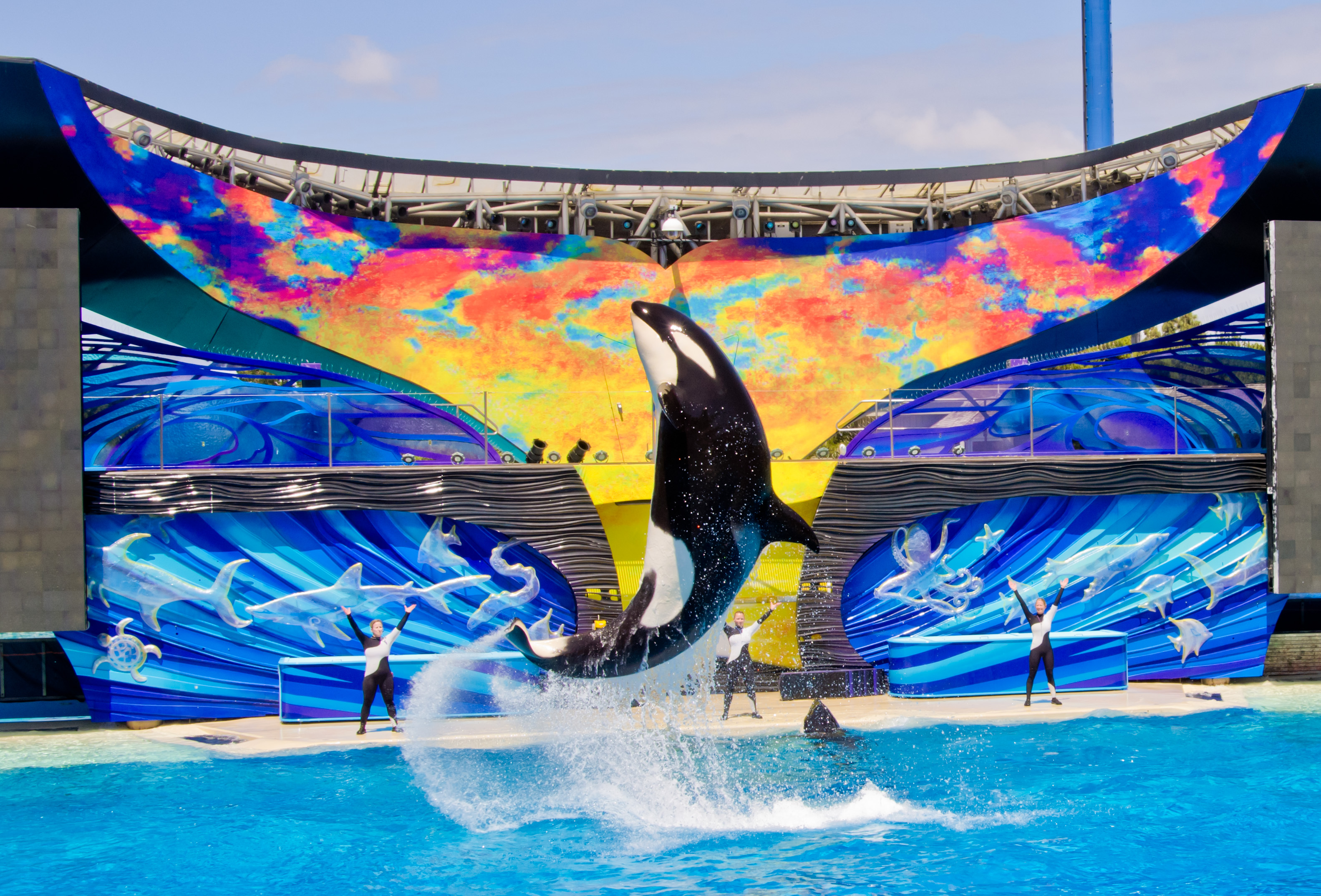
Orca in the "Believe" show.

SeaWorld's main attraction is its collection of orcas, eight of which are housed in SeaWorld San Diego in a 7,000,000 U.S. gal (26,000,000 L) pool. Shamu was the name of the first orca brought to SeaWorld San Diego in 1965. Shamu is now used as the character name for the costume character at the park entrance. SeaWorld San Diego ended their theatrical orca shows in San Diego in January 2017. San Diego was the first of the three SeaWorld parks to premiere Orca Encounter an educational presentation that gives insight into various aspects of an orca's life.

=== Wild Arctic ===
SeaWorld's Wild Arctic is home to various species of cold-water animals, including beluga whales, walruses, harbor seals, and southern sea otters. Polar bears were formerly exhibited.

In August 2026, SeaWorld San Diego became one of several aquariums participating in the relocation of the remaining belugas from the closed Marineland of Canada in Niagara Falls, Ontario. Three male belugas—14-year-old Xavier and 10-year-olds Cyprus and Jasper—arrived at SeaWorld San Diego on August 23, 2026.

The whales travelled approximately 2,500 miles (4,000 km) from Marineland to San Diego. They were transported by truck to John C. Munro Hamilton International Airport and then flown aboard a specially equipped cargo aircraft to San Diego International Airport, before being transported by truck to SeaWorld. During the journey, the whales were accompanied by veterinarians and animal-care specialists and were transported in custom-built containers with water-filled slings.

After arriving at SeaWorld, Xavier, Cyprus and Jasper were placed in a separate habitat while undergoing veterinary examinations and acclimating to their new surroundings. SeaWorld said the whales would be gradually introduced to its existing beluga population after completing the acclimation process.

=== Seals & Sea Lions ===
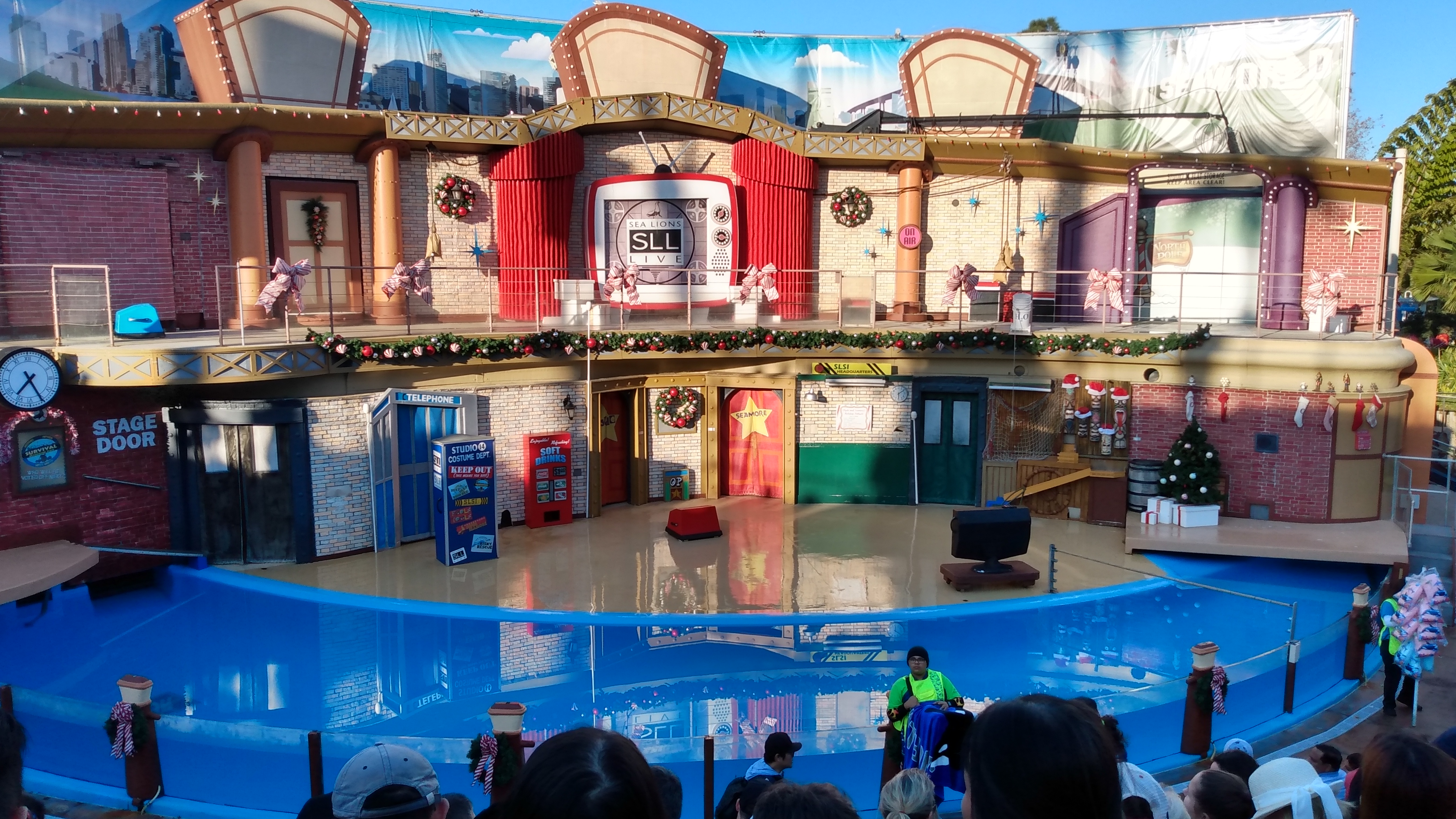
Sea Lion & Otter Amphitheater exhibit

SeaWorld San Diego's pinniped attractions house California sea lions, harbor seals, and Guadalupe fur seals.

=== Aquariums ===
SeaWorld San Diego features multiple fresh and saltwater aquariums of varying sizes, each housing different types of aquatic animals. The Ocean Voyager aquarium is home to marine animals including moray eels, octopuses, and Japanese spider crabs. The Ray Aquarium beneath the Manta coaster contains local Californian rays and fishes. In summer 2025, the Bayside Aquarium opened behind the Bayside Amphitheater, featuring multiple endangered or threatened species for which SeaWorld maintains conservation efforts.

=== Explorer's Reef ===
Opened on March 21, 2014, Explorer's Reef is an attraction that contains animal attractions and structures. Featuring four different touch pools, Explorer's Reef gives guests the opportunity to interact with a variety of fishes, including 400 brownbanded bamboo sharks and white-spotted bamboo sharks, and more than 4,000 cleaner fishes and horseshoe crabs.

=== Dolphins ===
There are three species of dolphins at SeaWorld San Diego: common dolphins, as well as a hybrid common and bottlenose female named Bullet; Atlantic and Pacific bottlenose dolphins; and Pacific and Atlantic short-finned pilot whales. The two current common dolphins were both rescued locally in 2024, bringing the species back to the park on a permanent basis as they were deemed unreleasable due to their young age and the severity of their injuries. They have since been named Cardiff (after the beach where he was found) and Chance, and are the only non-hybrid members of their species on exhibit in North America.

=== Penguins ===
An emperor penguin in San Diego Sea World.

The park offers a special live stream just for the penguins. The Penguin cam is a special live streaming webcam that offers a real-time look inside the park’s Penguin Encounter habitat. The Penguin cam is available during the holiday season through the end of December. The park will live stream from the Penguin Encounter habitat, allowing people to watch over 200 King, Adelie, Chinstrap, and Macaroni Penguins. Viewers will be able to experience the feeding of the penguins, cleaning, enrichment activities, and health exams. They will also see the penguins interact with each other, as well as over 4,000 pounds of fresh snow. Sea World’s mission for the Penguin Cam is to share their penguin colony with the world, show how special the penguins are, and motivate people to learn more about them during the holiday season.

=== Jewels of the Sea ===
Opened on March 15, 2025, Jewels of the Sea is an exhibit that features jellyfish. This exhibit focuses on jellyfish and educating children about the vital role that they play in our oceans ecosystem. It comprises three galleries that each contain several species of jellyfish. It utilizes LED’s to further show the beauty of jellyfish.

=== Belugas ===
Three male beluga whales were transported from Canada to San Diego on August 22nd of 2026. The entire operation took months of planning and dozens of animal care experts from both the U.S and Canada. Many different people and companies were involved such as Cinde Sweitzer, three young boys, National Oceanic and Atmospheric Administration, Sea World, John G. Shedd Aquarium, Georgia Aquarium, Tracy Saphr, and Eric Otjen. The three whales were transported in individual boxes via Qatar Airways Boeing 777 cargo plane, filled halfway with water to avoid them splashing around within the container. They spent about four and a half hours in the air before landing in San Diego. This act was considered a rescue since the animals no longer had a place to continue living. These three whales alongside thirty other whales were at risk of being euthanized if they could not be relocated. Luckily Sea World was able to assist the rescue, however as of 2026 they will not accessible to the public in any kind of exhibit.

== Attendance ==
2003	2004	2005	2006	2007	2008	2009	2010	2011	2012
4,000,000	4,000,000	—N/a	4,260,000	4,260,000	4,147,000	4,200,000	3,800,000	4,294,000	4,444,000
2013	2014	2015	2016	2017	2018	2019	2020	2021	2022
4,311,000	3,794,000	3,528,000	3,528,000	3,100,000	—N/a	—N/a	—N/a	2,800,000	3,510,000

== Seasonal attractions ==
=== Howl-O-Scream ===
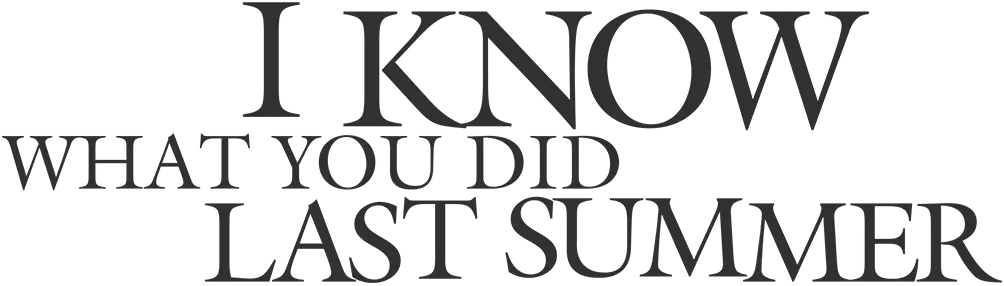
2026 Theme

SeaWorld San Diego Howl-O-Scream event is bigger in 2026, due to upgrades to its attractions. In 2026 there's 2 new haunted houses, one of them being based on I Know What You Did Last Summer. There's also 8 Scare zones, and spooky theme bars. SeaWorld expanded the event at Universal Studios and Six Flags.

=== Sesame Place San Diego ===
SeaWorld Entertainment purchased one of the Cedar Fair-owned "Knott's Soak City" water parks in late 2012. In 2013, the water park was opened as Aquatica San Diego. The park is located approximately 23 mi (37 km) southeast of its sister SeaWorld park, in Chula Vista, California. The park features 26 slides. On October 21, 2019, SeaWorld Entertainment announced that Aquatica San Diego would be converted into Sesame Place San Diego, the first Sesame Place theme park on the West Coast. Aquatica San Diego closed its final season in September 2021, and was re-opened as Sesame Place San Diego on March 26, 2022. The new park retained the water park attractions from Aquatica San Diego.

== Gallery ==
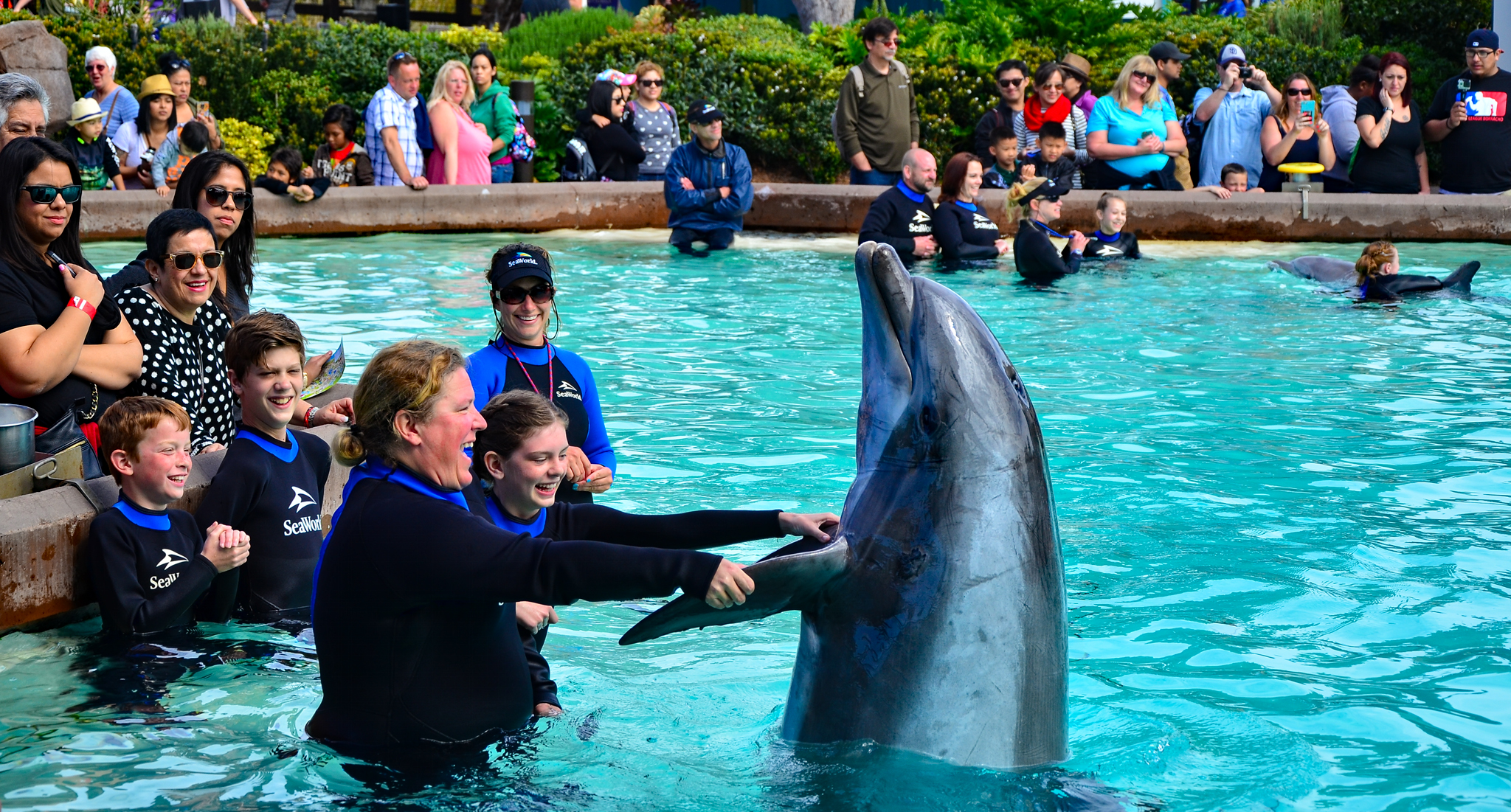
Close-up with the dolphins.

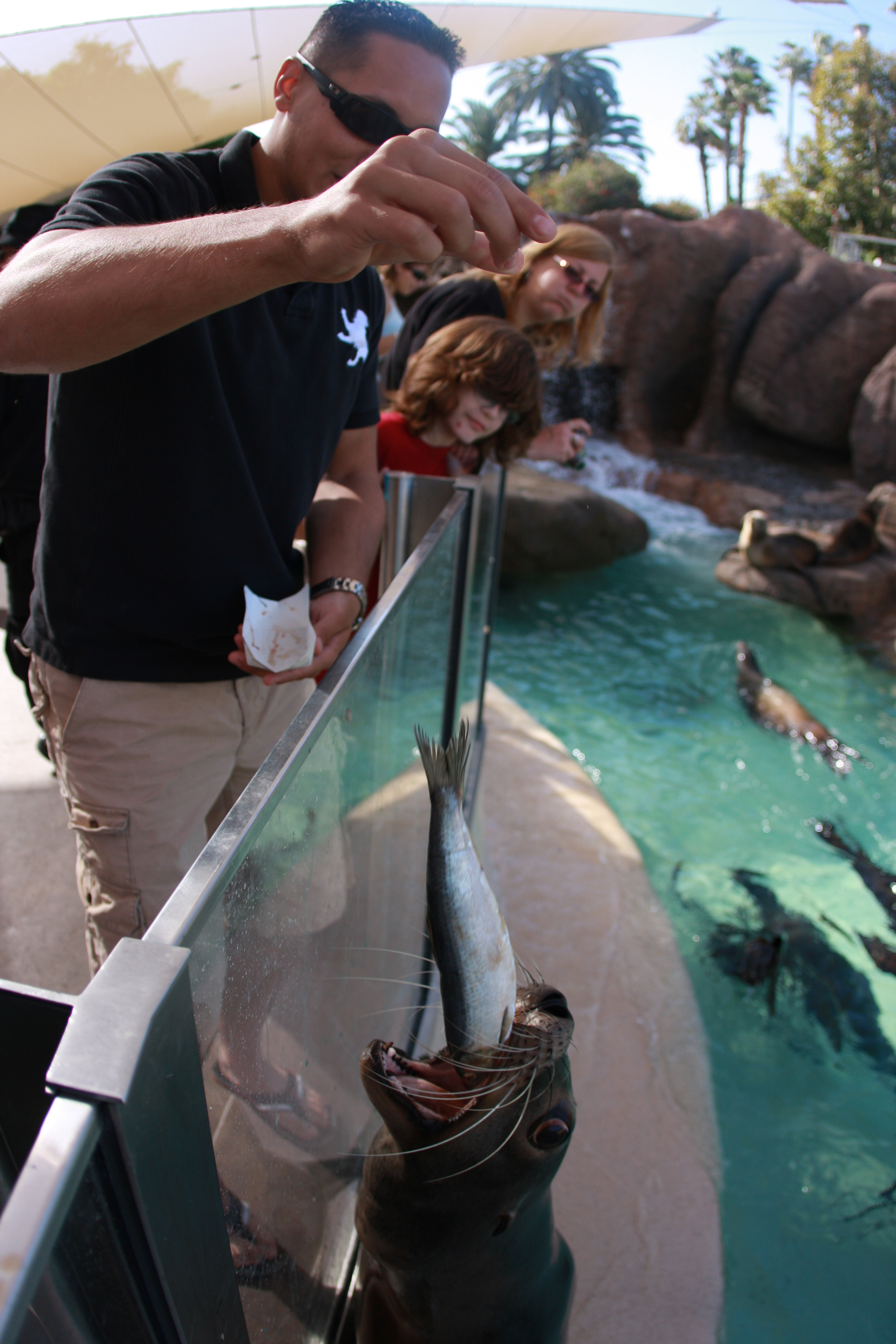
Sea Lion being fed by a guest.

At the 18th annual Kids First Fair.

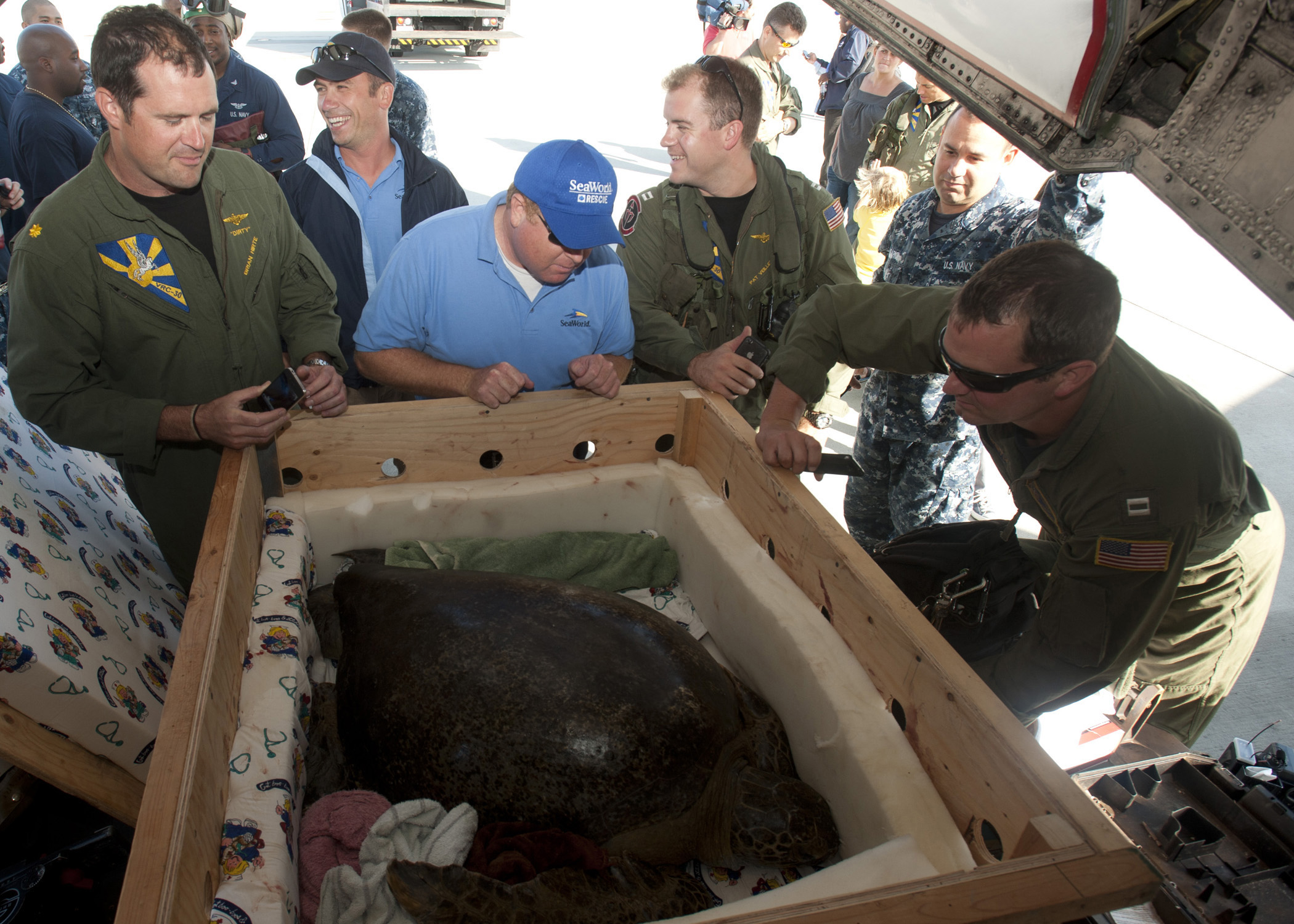
SeaWorld Rescue Team members working with the U.S. Navy evacuating an injured sea turtle.

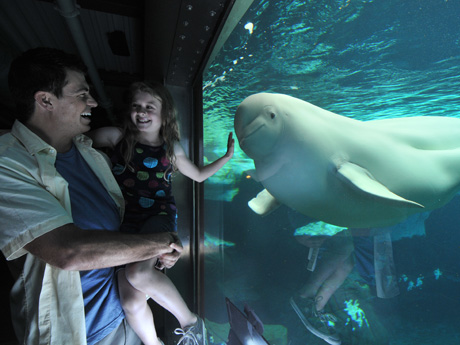
Beluga whale in the Wild Arctic exhibit.

Harbor seal in the Wild Arctic exhibit.

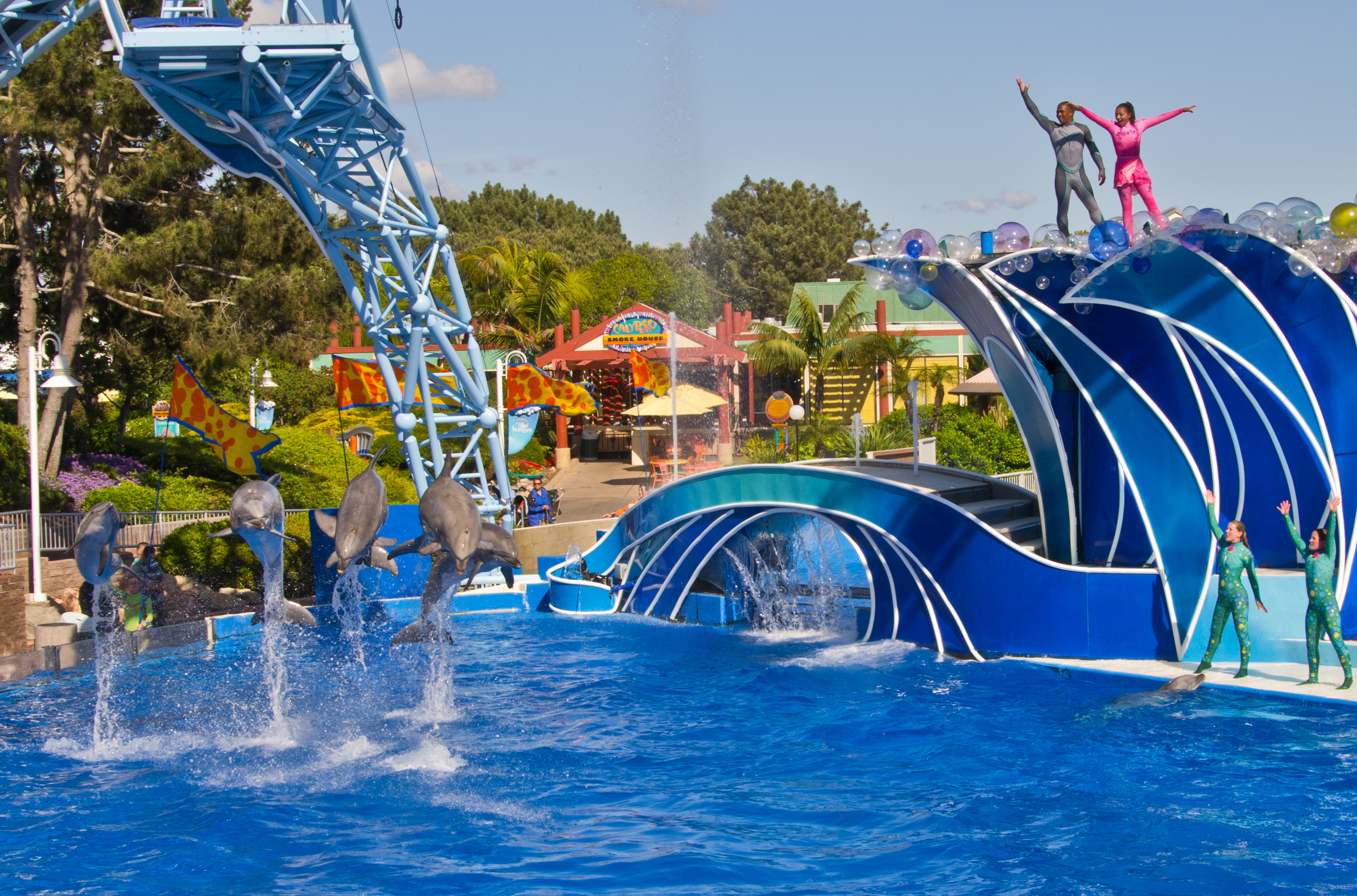
Dolphins jumping at a show.

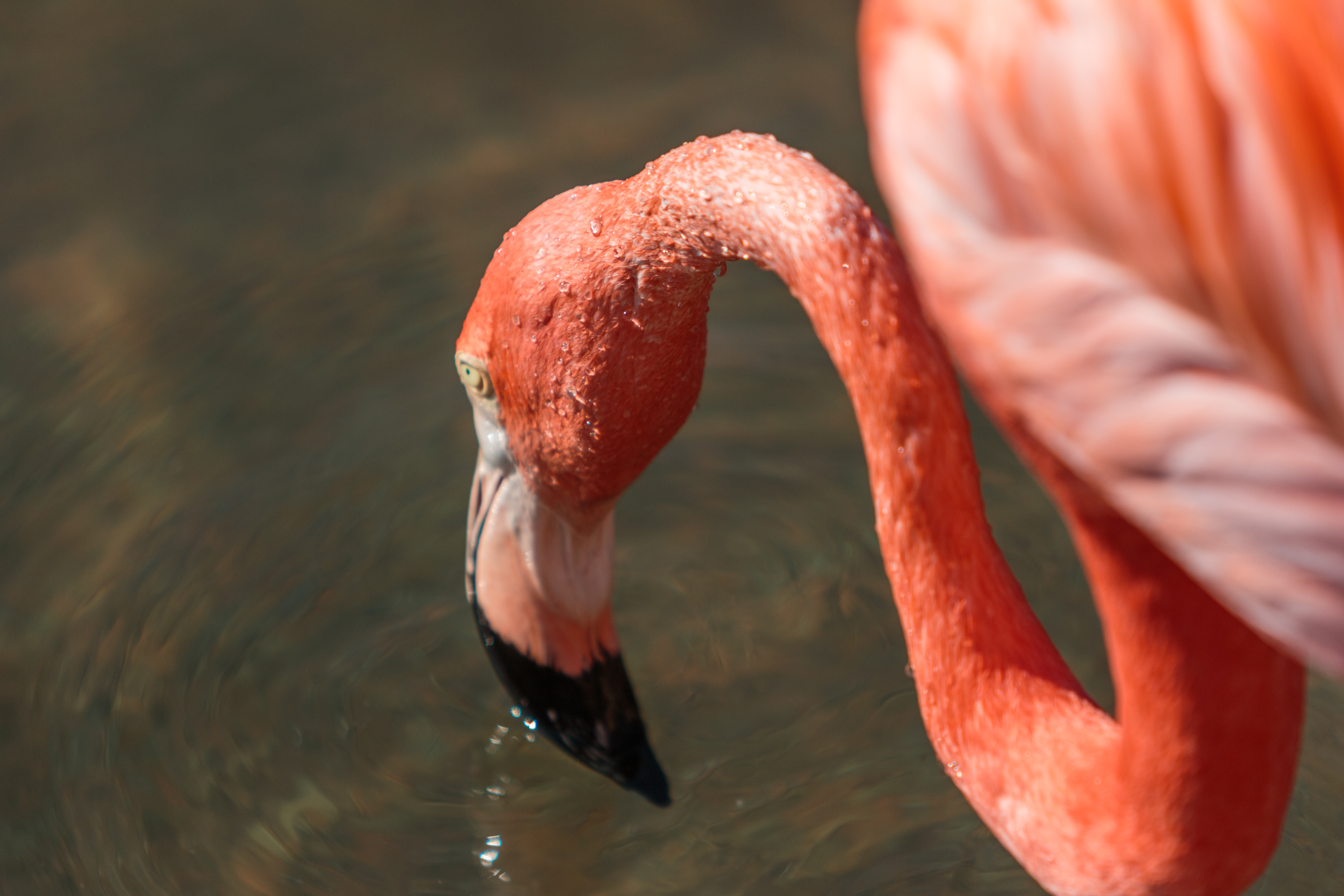
American flamingo in one of the ponds.

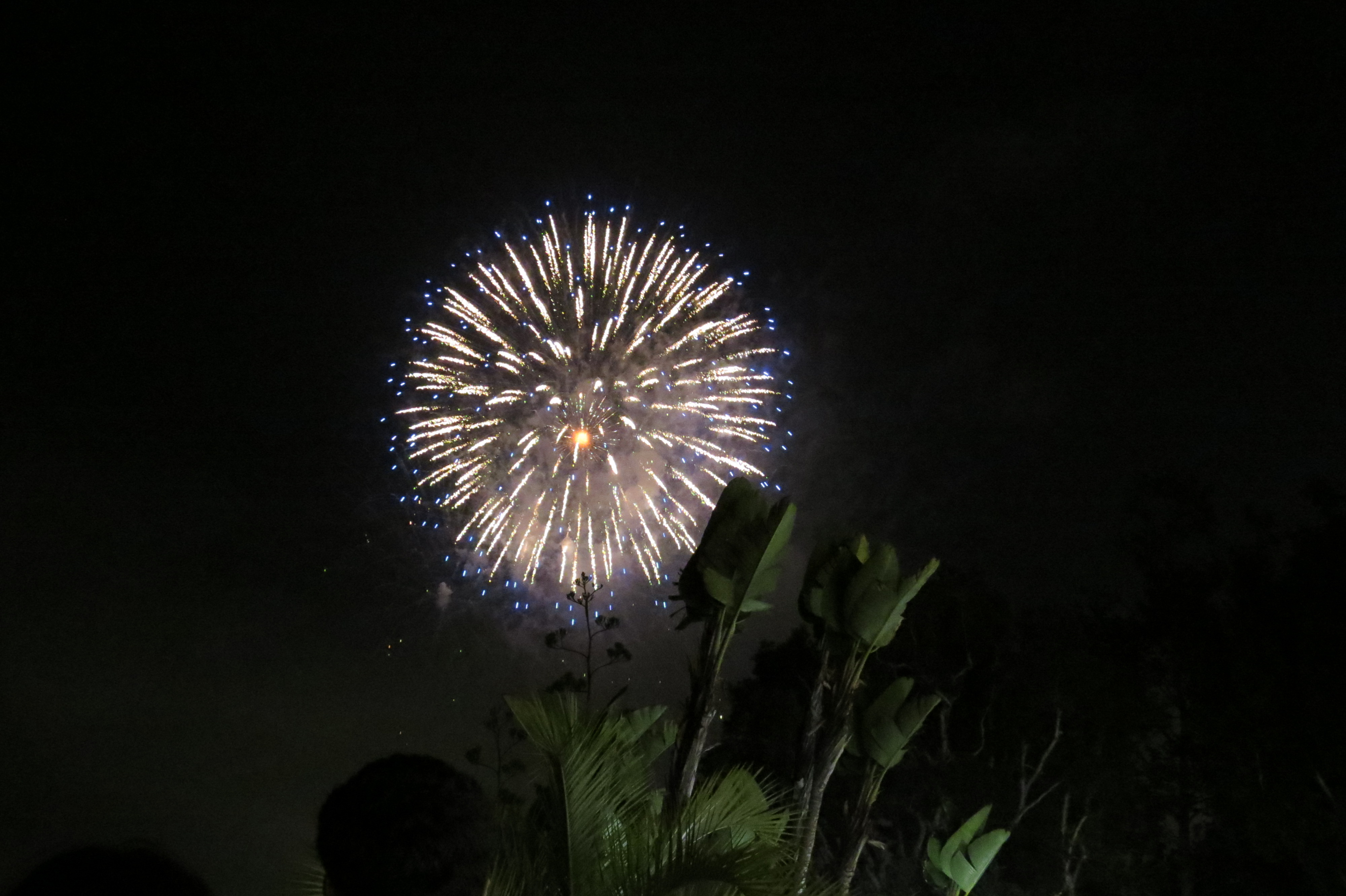
Fireworks at night.

== In popular culture ==
SeaWorld San Diego was a filming location for the films The Big Mouth (1967) and Anchorman 2: The Legend Continues (2013).

== See also ==
- SeaWorld
- Incidents at SeaWorld parks
- Aquarium
- Water park
- Amusement park
