= Weidenschwanz =

Uninhabited island in the Baltic Sea

Geography
- Location: Baltic Sea
- Coordinates: 53.982605°N 11.491108°E
- Area: 0.0004 km^{2} (0.00015 sq mi)
- Length: 0.042 km (0.0261 mi)
- Width: 0.017 km (0.0106 mi)

Administration
- DE-MV

Demographics
- Population: 0

Weidenschwanz (also Große Weidenschwanzinsel) is an uninhabited island, approximately 440 square metres in area, in the Breitling between the Mecklenburg mainland and the island of Poel. It belongs to the municipality of Blowatz.

The flat bodden island is approximately 42 metres long and up to 17 metres wide. It is located 370 metres from the mainland and 700 metres from Poel. About 115 metres north is the Kleine Weidenschwanzinsel.

The Weidenschwanz was used as pasture until the mid-1970s, but since then it has become a habitat for breeding birds. A homogeneously developed sea aster reedbed grows on the island with drifts of sea club-rush (Bolboschoenus maritimus), tall fescue (Festuca arundinacea) and greater sea-spurrey (Spergularia media) as well as the species on the Red List of Mecklenburg-Western Pomerania such as saltmarsh sedge (Festuca salina), sea aster (Aster tripolium) and sea wormwood (Artemisia maritima).

Weidenschwanz is part of the Wismar Bay Special Area of Conservation and the bird reserve of "Wismar Bay and Salzhaff".
