= Timmy (whale) =

Humpback whale (died 2026)

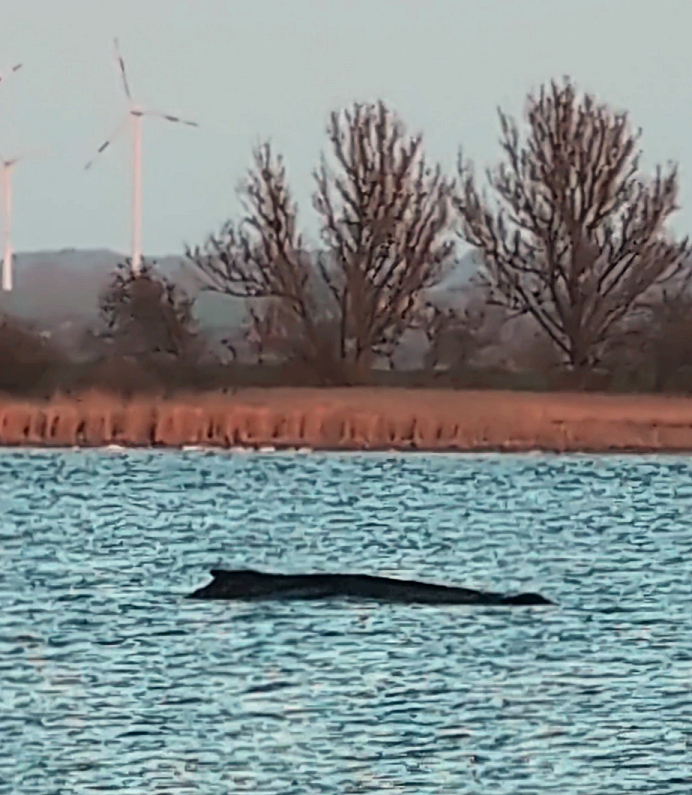
- Viewing on 1 April 2026
- Other name: Hope
- Species: Humpback whale
- Sex: Female
- Died: May 2026; Kattegat
- Cause of death: Starvation
- Known for: Entering the Baltic Sea and becoming repeatedly stranded
- Weight: About 12 tons
- Named after: Timmendorfer Strand

Timmy (died May 2026), also known as Hope or Fridolin, was a humpback whale who strayed into the Baltic Sea in March 2026. She became stranded at the German coast several times, before she was loaded onto a barge and released in the North Sea on 2 May 2026. The whale sparked a media frenzy. She was named after Timmendorfer Strand.

Timmy is thought to have died shortly after her release. Her remains were found near the Danish island of Anholt two weeks later. An autopsy revealed she died of starvation, with an obstruction in her mouth making eating impossible.

== Animal ==
Timmy was an adult or subadult humpback whale (Megaptera novaeangliae). It was 12.35 metres (40.5 ft) long and weighed an estimated 12 tons. Adult humpback whales typically reach a length of 13 to 17 metres (43 to 56 ft) and a weight of up to 30–40 tons. Males tend to be slightly smaller than females. Timmy was initially classified as a young bull (young male whale), but on 20 May, judging from milk duct openings, then visible on the upside-down carcass, whale researcher Fabian Ritter identified the whale as most likely female. Its exact age was unknown, but based on its size and behavior, it was estimated to be a few years old. Humpback whales can live up to 90 years. A necropsy in early June 2026 confirmed Timmy was female.

== History ==
Video of Timmy

=== Entering the Baltic Sea ===
The whale probably entered the Baltic Sea via the North Atlantic sometime in early 2026. From the North Sea, she passed through the Skagerrak and Kattegat straits into the Baltic. Why she chose this route is unknown, but she was most likely following swarms of fish. Humpback whales are rare in the Baltic Sea, and they cannot physically survive extended stays there due to its low salinity. Researchers suspect that the whale could have been disturbed by ships while pursuing a herring run. Because of its narrow outlet to the North Sea, the Baltic is difficult to escape once entered.

Although not yet given any name, Timmy was first spotted on 3 March 2026 around Wismar, where she was swimming very close to the coast. It is highly unusual for humpbacks to swim so near the land. Until 9 March she was seen with increasing frequency in the area, including in the port of Wismar and in Lübeck Bay. Enough observations had been made by that time for experts to realize she had become entangled in fishing nets, so Sea Shepherd and the local fire department began attempts to free her.

Although the nets were successfully removed on 9 March, the next day Timmy once again became entangled in a fishing net, this time near Steinbeck (Klütz). Another rescue operation freed her, but this time the coast guard escorted her out to sea in hopes that she would not get lost again and find herself in an unhealthy place for humpback whales. Timmy appeared to be full of vitality, swimming swiftly with the coast guard ship, then taking long, deep dives into the sea.

Nevertheless, between 14 and 15 March, Timmy had returned to the coast, where she was spotted repeatedly in places such as Warnkenhagen (Kalkhorst), Travemünde and Scharbeutz. On 19 March, Sea Shepherd saw Timmy swimming around the Trave River near Travemünde. A day later, she was observed in Lübeck Bay near Haffkrug and Scharbeutz struggling with fishing nets again. Another rescue operation removed most of them, but Timmy managed to swim away toward the open sea with a piece of rope still attached.

=== Stranded in shallow waters ===
On 23 March, the humpback whale was spotted early in the morning on a sandbar near Timmendorfer Strand at the village Niendorf. Volunteers from organizations such as Sea Shepherd and experts from ITAW Büsum (Institute for Terrestrial and Aquatic Wildlife Research) arrived to assess the situation. Experts partially freed her from a gillnet in which she had been entangled. Rescue efforts were started.

On 24 March, the first attempts were made to free her using a small suction dredger. These attempts failed because the sand was too compacted. Police boats tried to create waves, but this was unsuccessful. The whale's condition was deemed to be cause for concern.

On 25 March, the situation remained unchanged. A larger excavator was requested to dig a trench. In addition, humming from the whale stopped.

On 26 March, a major rescue operation began. Excavators dug a trench approximately 50 meters long and 1.20 meters deep. Marine biologist Robert Marc Lehmann led the rescue effort. Toward the evening, Timmy moved about 30–40 meters in the right direction into the channel. However, the operation was interrupted due to darkness.

During the night of 27 March, the whale freed herself from the sandbar and made it to deeper water. It could not be located, so a search was conducted using drones and boats. It was spotted near Haffkrug and again off Niendorf. Escort boats from the police and coast guard attempted to guide it, but she swam in the wrong direction. The boats were withdrawn to avoid causing stress to the animal.

=== Weakened state ===
On 28 March, the whale was spotted off the coast of Walfisch Island, stranded once again in shallow water.

During the night the water level rose, freeing the whale. However, she moved just a few meters before getting stranded again in water only about 2 meters deep. Mostly motionless, she was described by experts who had had a chance to examine her as in decidedly poor health.

On 30 March, experts, government officials, and Mecklenburg-Vorpommern's Minister of the Environment, Till Backhaus, attempted to rouse the whale using boats to create targeted noise in hopes it would encourage Timmy to swim away. Previously it had reacted fairly quickly to such stimuli, but this time it was slower. At first she swam in the wrong direction (toward the harbor), but then she turned seaward and dove into the open Baltic Sea. Nevertheless, rescuers were worried because they had discovered that a remnant of the fishing net remained in her mouth.

During the night of 31 March, Timmy dove underwater and could no longer be spotted, so the coast guard decided to stop tracking her. In the morning, she was spotted again in Wismar Bay, swimming very actively and appearing to be better. Later that day, though, she beached herself in shallow water in front of a bay near the island of Poel. Experts from the Ocean Museum Germany in Stralsund and Greenpeace as well as coast guard members arrived on site to assess her. Closer inspection with expert eyes revealed Timmy's skin had deteriorated significantly and she was much weaker than the morning's observations had suggested.

On 1 April, the experts revealed they did not expect Timmy to survive, so all rescue operations were halted.

=== Further rescue attempts ===
On 6 April, experts rejected a proposal to rescue the whale with a special catamaran from Denmark, advising it not only was unlikely to succeed but would also probably cause the whale further suffering.

Nine days later, the experts allowed a private rescue initiative to proceed. Its plan was to transport Timmy by raising her with lifting bags, spreading a tarpaulin stretched between two pontoons beneath her, then moving the pontoons with a tugboat.

On 20 April, the whale freed herself and swam under its own strength. Boats from the German Life Saving Association (DLRG) tried to guide the animal towards open seas. At first disoriented and unable to swim in any direction consistently, Timmy figured out how to swim away from the bay later the same day. However, it took only about two hours for her to stop swimming again, and it came to rest on a sand bank.

=== Transport and release ===
By late April, activists had dug a trench into the sand bank and maneuvered a 50-meter long and 13-meter wide barge in front of the whale. On 28 April, aided by helpers guiding it with ropes, in a 4-hour operation, cheered on by onlookers, Timmy swam into the partially submerged barge, the door was closed, and a tugboat was moved in position to pull the barge from the Baltic Sea to the North Sea.

On 1 May 2026, the tugboat and barge had passed Skagen and reached the North Sea. Through the night and early the next morning, netting closing the entrance was removed and additional tanks were flooded, but Timmy would not leave the barge. Early on 2 May, Timmy finally exited the barge, then dived, resurfaced, and spouted before swimming away.

=== Death ===
The GPS data from a tracking device attached to Timmy were intended for only a few activists and government officials to prevent large numbers of people from disturbing her. The tracker data showed the whale swimming 215 km slowly south in Kattegat from 2 May to around 7 May west of Anholt, then drifting for a week before grounding on Anholt.

According to a rescue project representative on May 5, the device failed to transmit useable data. Public debate about Timmy's location and condition intensified. By 5 May experts from the Ocean Museum Germany had concluded that Timmy had most likely drowned due to exhaustion, and the spout seen on 2 May was most probably her last sign of life.

On 14 May a humpback whale carcass matching Timmy's measurements was sighted about 75 metres (82 yd) off the Danish island of Anholt. Danish environmental inspector Morten Abildstrøm told the press that Timmy had been dead for a while, and, after consultation with researchers, he thought the remains to be hers. A superficial inspection found no GPS device on the upside-down carcass, but on 16 May a thorough search by Danish officials finally managed to locate it. Its serial number confirmed the remains were Timmy's. During the autopsy on June 4, a cervix was found confirming its gender as female. The plan is to display some of the bones in the University of Copenhagen Zoological Museum, while the blubber and other remains are processed into biodiesel and biogas.

== Reactions ==
The rescue operation sparked a media frenzy in Germany, where it dominated the news. Live streams of the whale and the rescue attempts, including those by ZDF, reached millions of people. The whale also made headlines in the international press.

The whale was named Timmy by the German tabloid Bild and Hape Kerkeling. The name comes from Timmendorfer Strand, the place where it first washed ashore.

Most established cetacean researchers and experts opposed the rescue mission, described it as cruel and likely to intensify and prolong Timmy's suffering given the realities of the injuries the whale had suffered, and predicted that Timmy would die soon after its alleged rescue. Burkard Baschek, director of the Ocean Museum Germany, stated that the whale likely "suffered greatly" during its purported rescue, upon viewing a drone video of the Timmy struggling and banging against the sides of the barge as the crew apparently tried to pull it out.

The involvement of marine biologist and social media influencer Robert Marc Lehmann proved highly controversial. He became the most prominent face of the movement to rescue Timmy, contradicting the advice of the majority of experts. Lehmann had previously approached the animal during dives to take photos of himself with the whale and he was accused by ITAW experts of self-promotion and self-aggrandizement. Doubts about Lehmann's alleged expertise were also raised by inaccurate statements he made about the whale's anatomy, which had to be corrected by the ITAW's veterinarian, and by misleading claims Lehmann has made about his résumé. This friction led to Lehmann's departure from the rescue mission.

The nets that were entangled in and around the whale sparked a debate in the German media and political circles about ghost nets.

The controversy attracted the attention of the German far right and miscellaneous conspiracy theorists, some of whom believed they could create a "psychic aura" which could reach the whale and save it. Others used the opportunity to attack the ruling SPD government in the run-up to Mecklenburg-Vorpommern's parliamentary elections. Scurrilous accusations and death threats were sent to scientists and officials who opposed the rescue mission. The media frenzy likely resulted in the state government capitulating to public pressure and ignoring the advice and warnings of scientific experts.

Accelerated by social media coverage, speculation, and conspiracy theories, the events surrounding the whale got more dramatic by mid-April 2026, when onlookers gathered near the bay at Poel and some 50 activists broke through protective fencing to reach the waterfront near the animal.

== See also ==
- List of individual cetaceans
- Humphrey the Whale
- Peanut (squirrel)
