= Grot Deil =

Uninhabited Baltic Sea island

Geography
- Location: Breitling
- Coordinates: 53.988088°N 11.488020°E
- Area: 0.0017 km^{2} (0.00066 sq mi)
- Length: 0.055 km (0.0342 mi)
- Width: 0.055 km (0.0342 mi)

Administration
- DE-MV

Demographics
- Population: 0

Grot Deil is an uninhabited Baltic Sea island in the Breitling between the mainland of Mecklenburg and the island of Poel. It has an area of approximately 0.17 hectares and belongs to the municipality of Blowatz.

The flat bodden island is approximately 55 metres long and wide. Its shape resembles a U lying on its side because of an indentation in the northwest. It is located 340 metres from the mainland and 520 metres from Poel.

Grot Deil was used as pasture until the mid-1970s, and has since become a habitat for breeding birds. A homogeneously developed sea aster reedbed grows on the island with drifts of sea club-rush (Bolboschoenus maritimus), tall fescue (Festuca arundinacea) and greater sea-spurrey (Spergularia media) as well as the species on the Red List of Mecklenburg-Western Pomerania such as English scurvygrass (Cochlearia anglica), saltmarsh sedge (Festuca salina), sea aster (Aster tripolium) and sea wormwood (Artemisia maritima). /ref>

Grot Deil is part of the Wismar Bay Special Area of Conservation and the bird reserve of "Wismar Bay and Salzhaff".
