= Eggers Wiek =

Bight in Germany

Coordinates: 53°56′41″N 11°21′52″E

Eggers Wiek as part of the Bay of Wismar

Eggers Wiek is a sickle-shaped bay within the Bay of Wismar on the southwestern Baltic Sea coast of the German state of Mecklenburg. Its stretch of beach lies about six kilometres northwest of the Hanseatic town of Wismar and is about five kilometres long. The coast here is steep in places with sea cliffs up to 11 m above sea level (NN), but in the middle it also has flat, sandy beaches. Opposite the Wiek lies the island of Poel, about 3.5 kilometres away. Eggers Wiek is bordered to the northwest by the stony cape of the Hohe Wieschendorfer Huk. West of this hook, the larger bay of Wohlenberger Wiek opens up. The coastal section of Eggers Wiek belongs to the parishes of Hohenkirchen and Zierow in the district of Nordwestmecklenburg. In Hohes Wieschendorf in the municipality of Hohenkirchen, the landing stage has been expanded into a marina which, along with a golf course on the cape, contributes to the development of tourism in the area.
