= Ahrendsberg =

Island in Germany

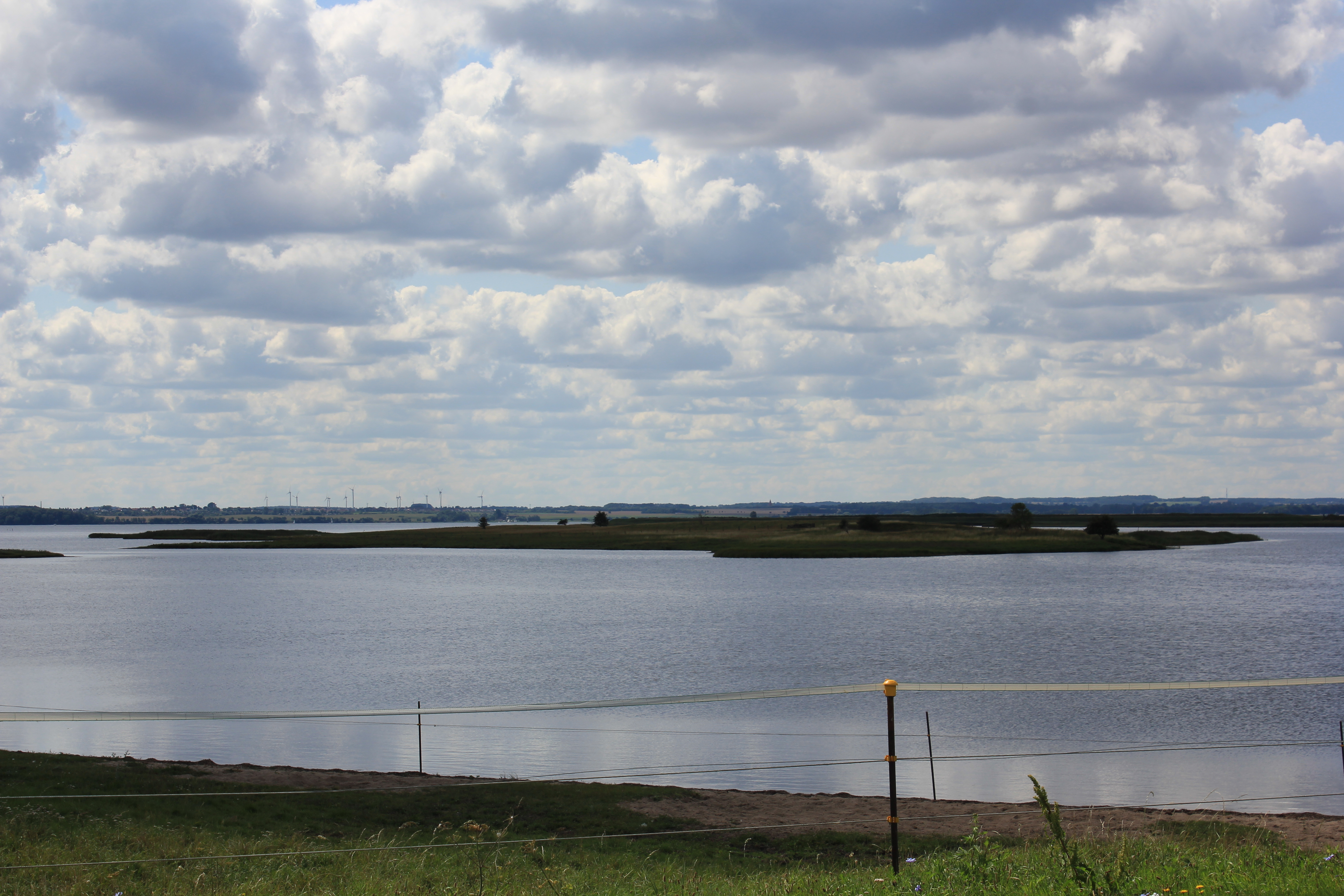
- Ahrendsberg seen from the island of Poel

- Ahrendsberg in the Bay of Wismar

Geography
- Location: Baltic Sea
- Coordinates: 53°57′58″N 11°28′05″E
- Area: 8.6 ha (21 acres)
- Length: 0.600 km (0.3728 mi)
- Width: 0.220 km (0.1367 mi)

Administration
- Germany

Demographics
- Population: 0

Ahrendsberg (German pronunciation: [ˈaːʁəntsˌbɛʁk]) is an uninhabited island, 8.6 hectares (21 acres) in area, near the island of Poel in the Breitling, a strait off the Bay of Wismar on the Baltic coast of Germany.

The island, which is roughly 600 metres (2,000 ft) long and up to 220 metres (720 ft) wide, is dominated by salt meadows with shores that are dissected by creeks. The higher areas are generally very dry, nutrient-poor, and are characterised by stunted vegetation, for example dry, lean grassland with thistle (Cirsium acaule) and sand thyme (Thymus serpyllum). At the southern tip of the island is a short section of cliff.
