= Timmendorf =

- Ortsteil of Insel Poel
- View of Timmendorf Lighthouse
- Interactive map of Timmendorf
- Location within Germany Location within Mecklenburg-Vorpommern
- Coordinates: 53°59′26″N 11°23′27″E
- Country: Germany
- State: Mecklenburg-Vorpommern
- District: Nordwestmecklenburg
- Municipality: Insel Poel
- Elevation: 5 m (16 ft)
- Time zone: UTC+01:00 (CET)
  - Summer (DST): UTC+02:00 (CEST)
- Postal codes: 23999
- Dialling codes: 038425

Timmendorf is part of the municipality of Insel Poel on the Baltic Sea island of the same name in the district of Nordwestmecklenburg in the German state of Mecklenburg-Vorpommern. Timmendorf lies on the west coast of the island of Poel and is divided into the villages of Timmendorf and Timmendorf Strand, which are about a kilometre from one another. A prominent landmark in Timmendorf Strand and sea mark for the navigation of shipping in the Bay of Wismar is Timmendorf Lighthouse. A little to the north of the lighthouse there is a pilot's house with a tower. The settlement has a one-kilometre-long sandy beach and a small harbour in which sports boats, fishing vessels and a pilot boat are moored. The tourist infrastructure includes various holiday apartments, a large campsite and several restaurants. In summer the beach of Timmendorf Strand is packed with visiting bathers and the harbour of Timmendorf is full of yachts.
