= Salzhaff =

Lagoon in Germany

The Salzhaff in the northeast part of the Bay of Wismar

The Salzhaff is a part of the Bay of Wismar that is almost cut off from the Baltic Sea by the spit of the Wustrow and Boiensdorfer Werder peninsulas. It is located south of the town of Rerik in Mecklenburg-Vorpommern and southwest of the seaside resort of Kühlungsborn in Central Mecklenburg. It is linked to the Bay of Wismar by the Breitling.

The Wustrow Peninsular was used by the military until the withdrawal of the Soviet Army in the early 1990s. The adjacent bay of Kroy in the western part of the Salzhaff and the sandy island of Kieler Ort just offshore are both conservation areas. The Salzhaff is a popular holiday and recreation region. Its shallow waters are ideally suited to beginners in the sports of sailing and surfing.

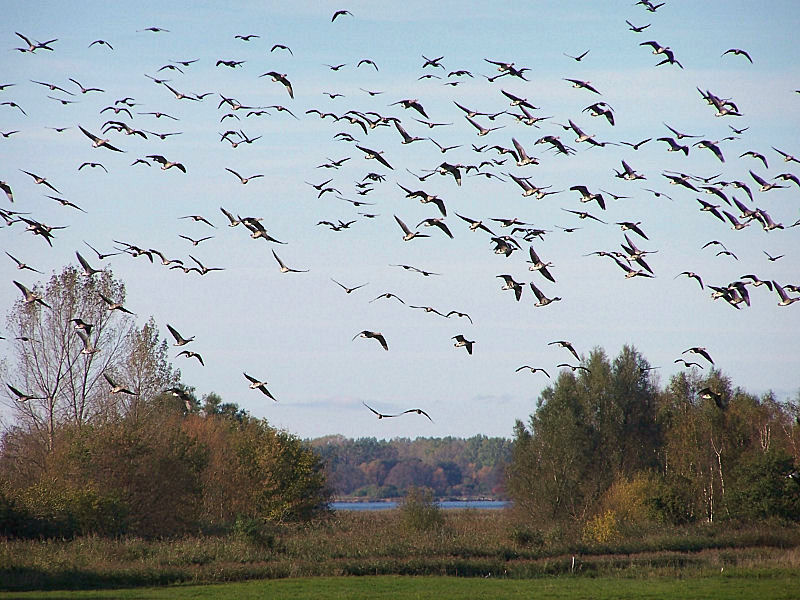
Greylag geese during migration

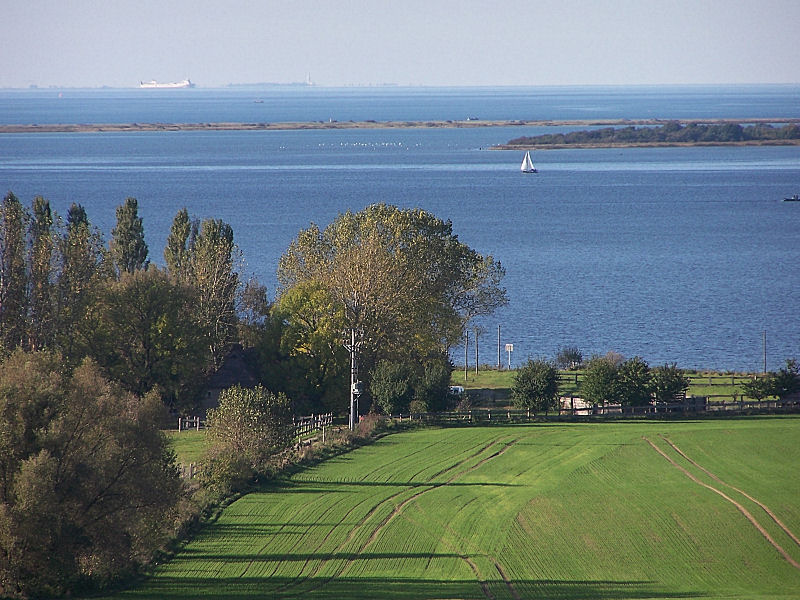
View from the Scharberg towards Fehmarn

54°5′N 11°36′E
