= Timmendorfer Strand =

- Municipality
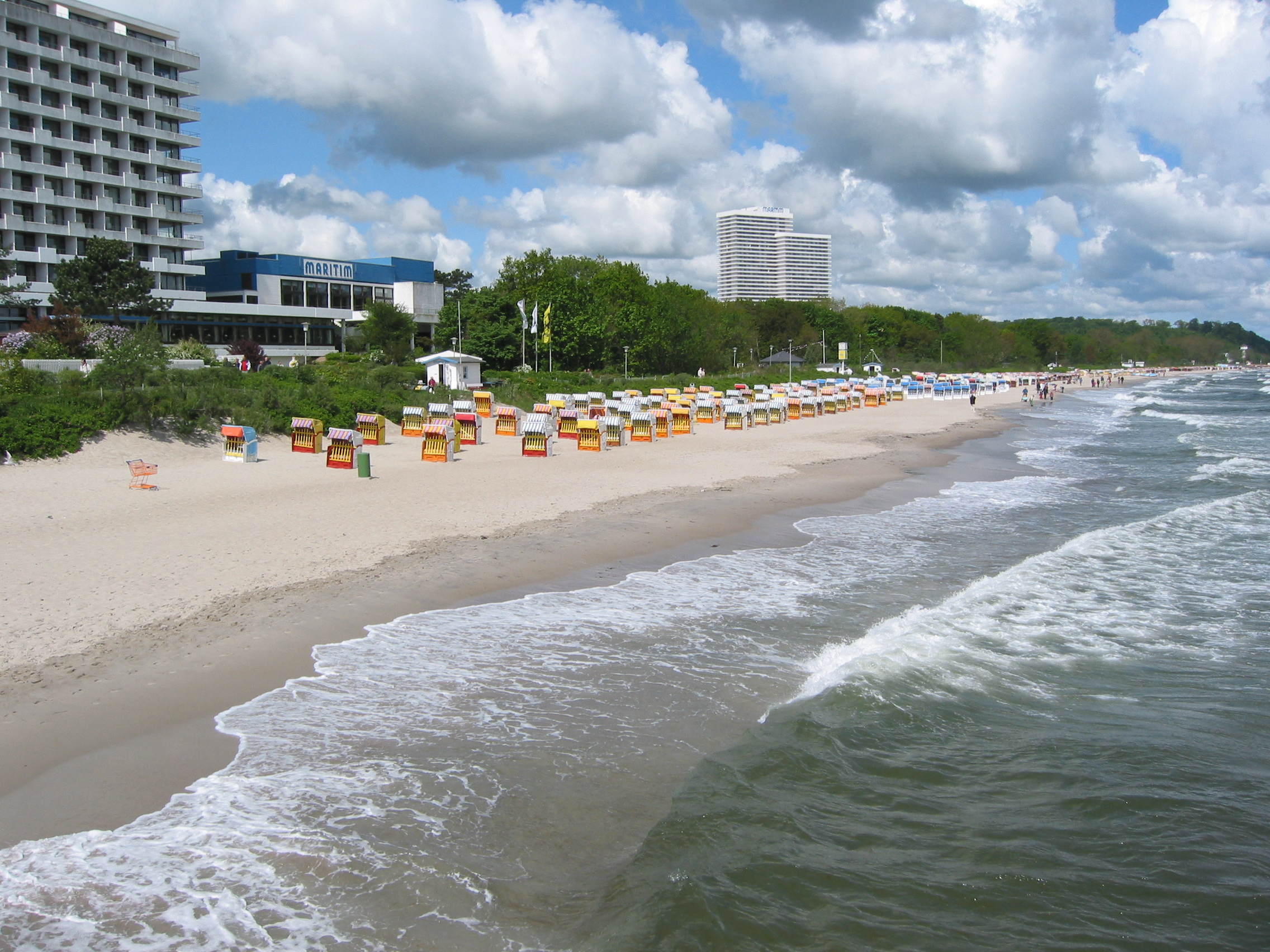

- Flag Coat of arms

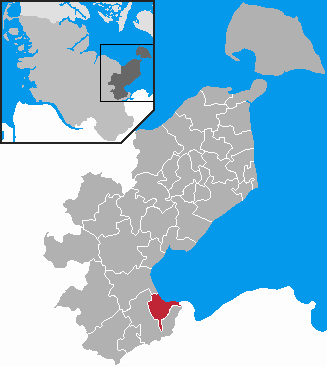
- Location of Timmendorfer Strand within Ostholstein district
- Interactive map of Timmendorfer Strand
- Location within Germany Location within Schleswig-Holstein
- Coordinates: 53°59′40″N 10°46′57″E
- Country: Germany
- State: Schleswig-Holstein
- District: Ostholstein

Government
  - Mayor: Sven Partheil-Böhnke

Area
  - Total: 20.12 km^{2} (7.77 sq mi)
- Elevation: 2 m (6.6 ft)

Population (2025-12-31)
  - Total: 8,276
  - Density: 411.3/km^{2} (1,065/sq mi)
- Time zone: UTC+01:00 (CET)
  - Summer (DST): UTC+02:00 (CEST)
- Postal codes: 23669
- Dialling codes: 04503
- Vehicle registration: OH
- Website: www.timmendorfer- strand.org

Timmendorfer Strand (Timmendorf Beach) is a municipality in the district of Ostholstein, in Schleswig-Holstein, Germany. It is situated on the Bay of Lübeck (Baltic Sea), approximately 15 km (9.3 mi) northwest of Lübeck, and 20 km (12 mi) southeast of Eutin.

== Notable people ==
- Lilo Peters (1913–2001), German painter and sculptor, lived in Timmendorfer Strand.
- Timmy (unknown–2026), Humpback whale
