= St. Nicholas Church, Wismar =

Coordinates: 53°53′44″N 11°27′56″E

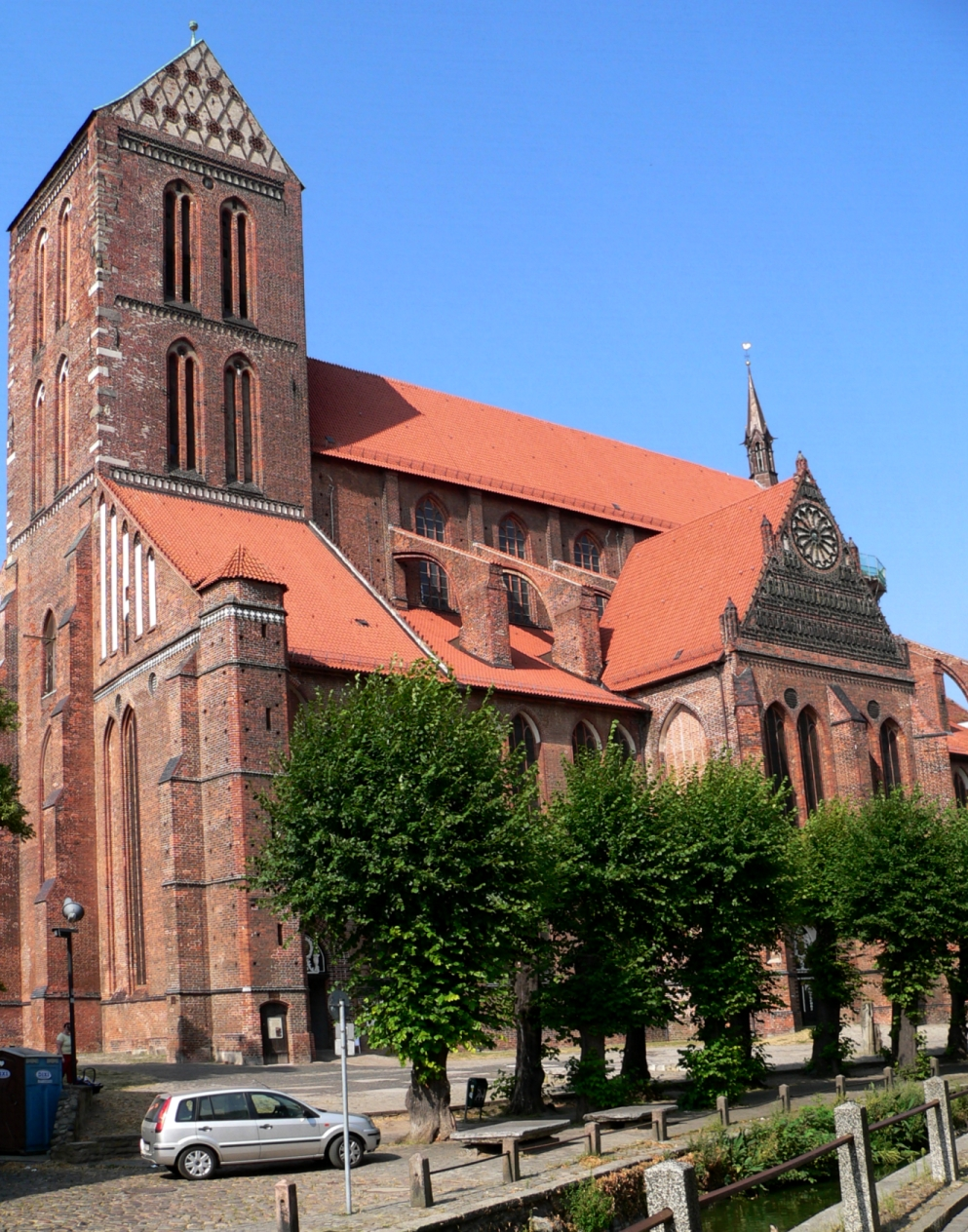
From the south side

The nave of St. Nicholas Church

St. Nicholas of Wismar was built from 1381 until 1487 as a church for sailors and fishermen. St. Nicholas is one of the finest testaments to medieval brick architecture in northern Germany.

Based on the design of Marienkirche (St. Mary's) in Lübeck, it is the second-highest brick basilica church in the world after St. Mary's of Lübeck. St. Nicholas along with St. Mary's and St. George's is one of the three great churches that dominate the skyline of the city of Wismar. As part of Wismar's historic center, it was inscribed on the UNESCO World Heritage List in 2002.

== History ==
- 1226 – Foundation of the city of Wismar
- 1255 – First documentary reference to St Nicholas
- 1270 – A dispatch mentions new construction at St Nicholas.
- 1370 – Start of alterations to the basilica with a choir ambulatory, based on the design of the St. Mary's Church, Lübeck.
- 1403 – Chancel consecrated.
- 1434 – Construction of the flanking aisles, annexes, and naves.
- 1459 – The church is consecrated.
- 1508 – Construction of the spire
- 1517 – Start of the Reformation
- 1523 – Heinrich Never brings the Reformation to Wismar.
- 1632 – Wismar captured and held by Sweden until 1803
- 1703 – Spire collapses in a severe storm, severely damaging the roof, vaulting, decor, and furnishing of the nave.
- 1867 – Revaulting of the nave
- 1890 – Complete renovation in the contemporary neo-Gothic style
- 1945 – St. Nicholas remains the only large church in Wismar undamaged by war
- 1975 – The Mende organ from Freiberg in Saxony arrives at St. Nicholas Church.
- 1989 – St. Nicholas becomes a platform for political protest in Wismar.
- 2010 – A new organ in the choir is consecrated.

== Exterior decorations ==
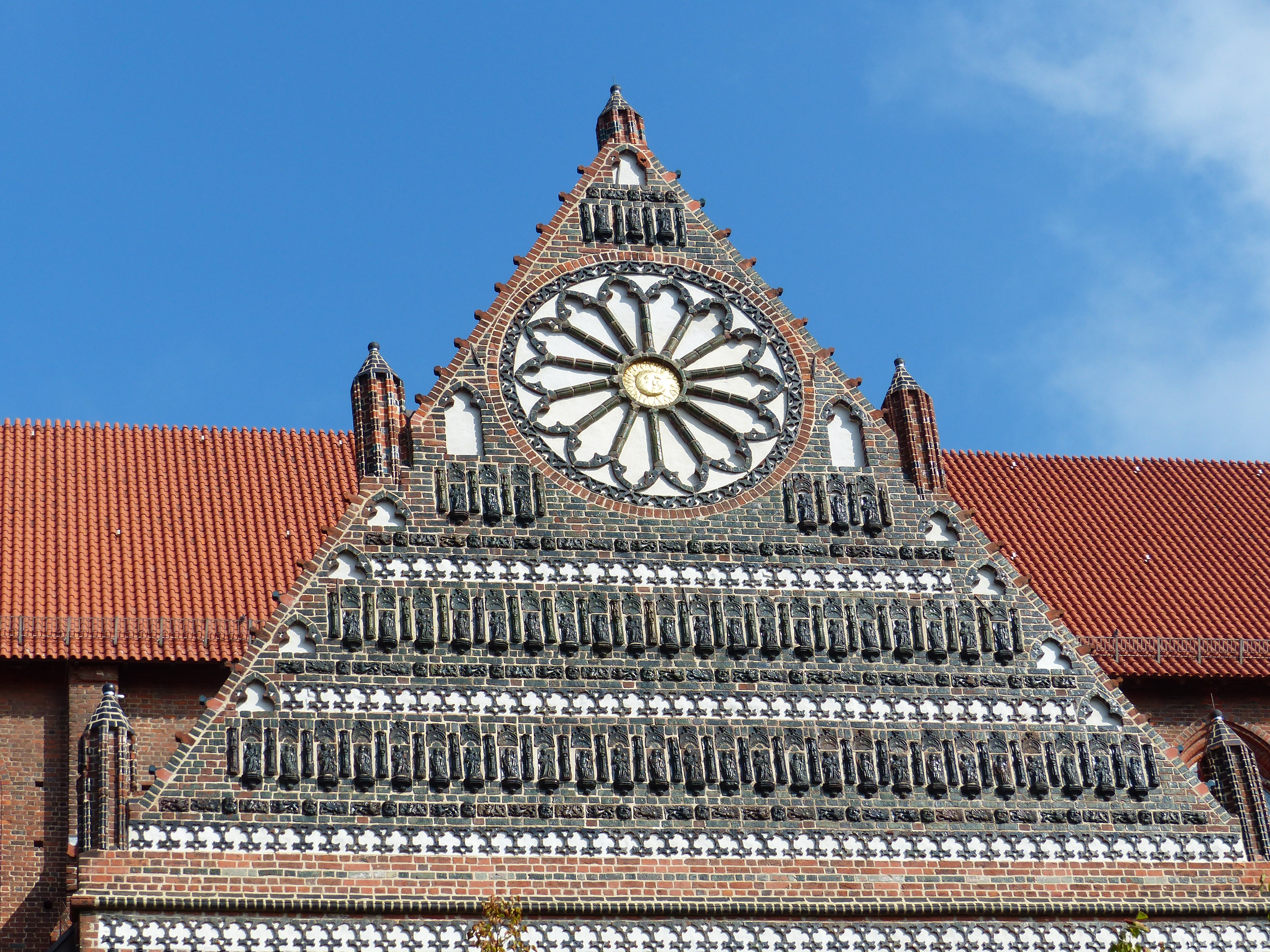
Gable of the southern tranept

The gable of the southern transept is covered with decorations of glazed terracotta. There is a large and sophisticated blind rose window with a golden sun in the center. There are galleries with an abundant number of relief sculptures of saints and kings.

Both eastern edges of the tower are decorated with squared limestone.

== Interior decoration ==
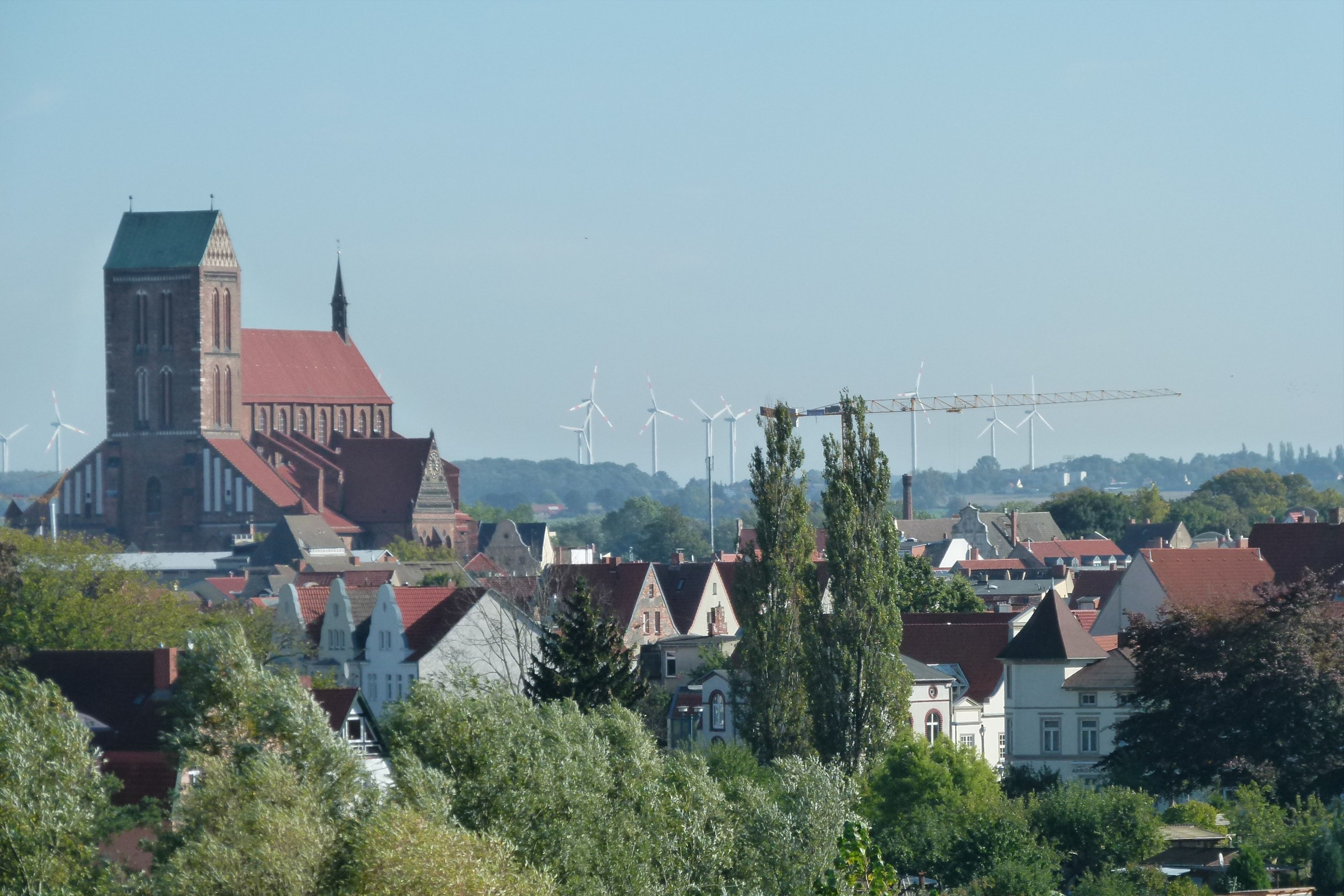
The town of Wismar with St. Nicholas Church

- The high altar is a product of the late Baroque period (1774)
- The choir organ
- Triumphal cross (15th century)
- Pulpit (1708), a Baroque work by Johannes von Rehn
- Mende Organ. The organ has a Renaissance era casing with Baroque enhancements, and was constructed by Johann Gottlob Mende (1787–1850).
- A bronze baptismal font (1335) originally from St. Mary's Church. It portrays scenes from Jesus' life as well as the parable of the wise and foolish virgins.
- The high altar and the triumphal cross from St. George Church (both c. 1430) in the southside chapel.
- Bronze burial slab (1504) of Duchess Sophie of Mecklenburg.
- The Mariner's Altar is the only one of 38 former 'native' altars that remains in St. Nicholas.
