= Walfisch =

Island in Germany

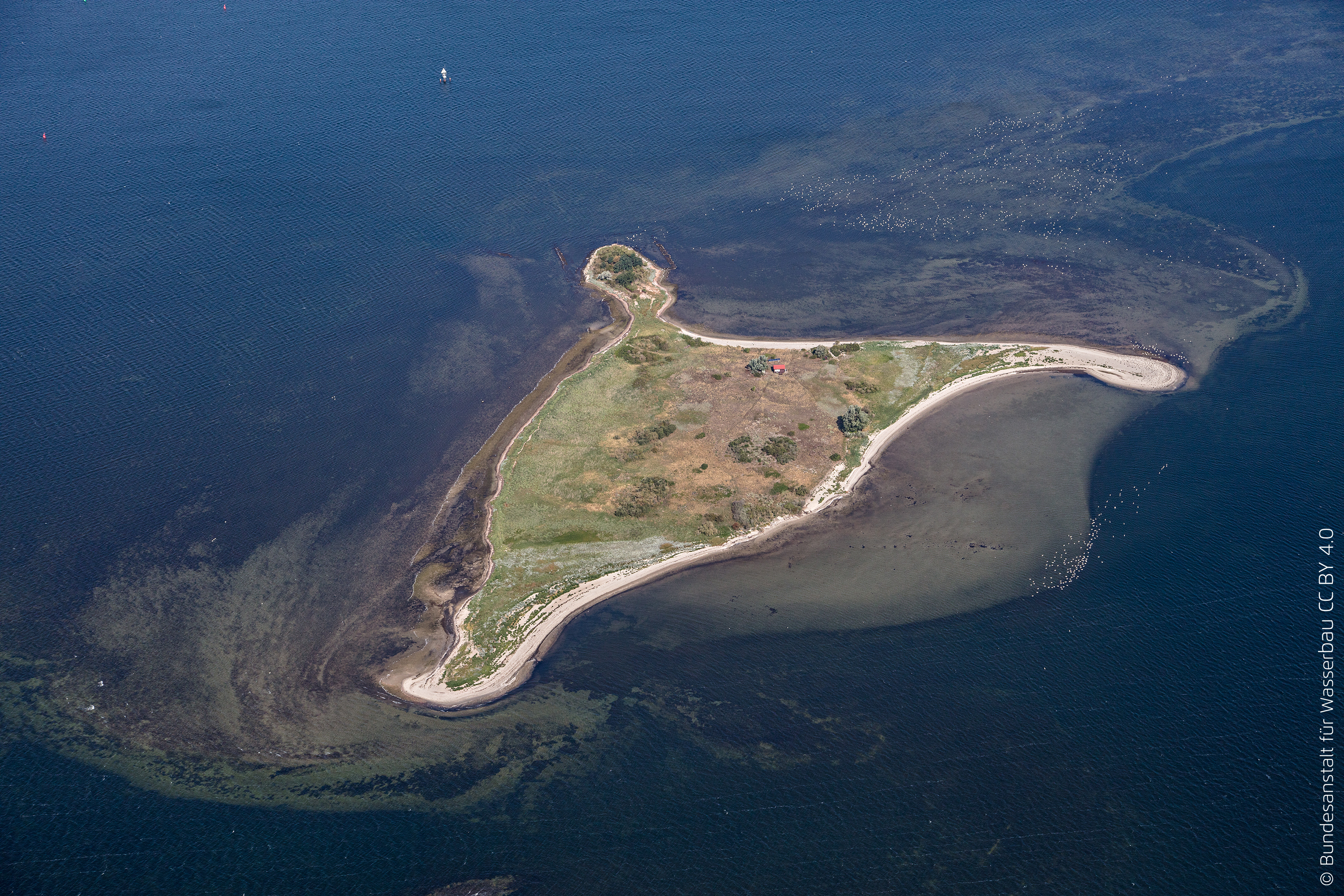
- An aerial photograph of Walfisch
- Interactive map of Walfisch

Geography
- Location: Bay of Wismar, Baltic Sea
- Coordinates: 53°56′25″N 11°25′38″E
- Area: 0.0865 km^{2} (0.0334 sq mi)
- Length: 0.560 km (0.348 mi)
- Width: 0.300 km (0.1864 mi)

Administration
- DE-MV

Demographics
- Population: 0

Map of the Bay of Wismar

Walfisch (German pronunciation: [ˈvaːlˌfɪʃ]) is an uninhabited German island, in the Bay of Mecklenburg in the Baltic Sea. It lies approximately 4.5 kilometres (2.8 mi) north of the city of Wismar, south of the island of Poel. The island is very flat and has a maximum circumference of about 500 by 300 metres (1,640 ft × 980 ft), a surface area of 20 hectares (49 acres) and is a nature reserve.

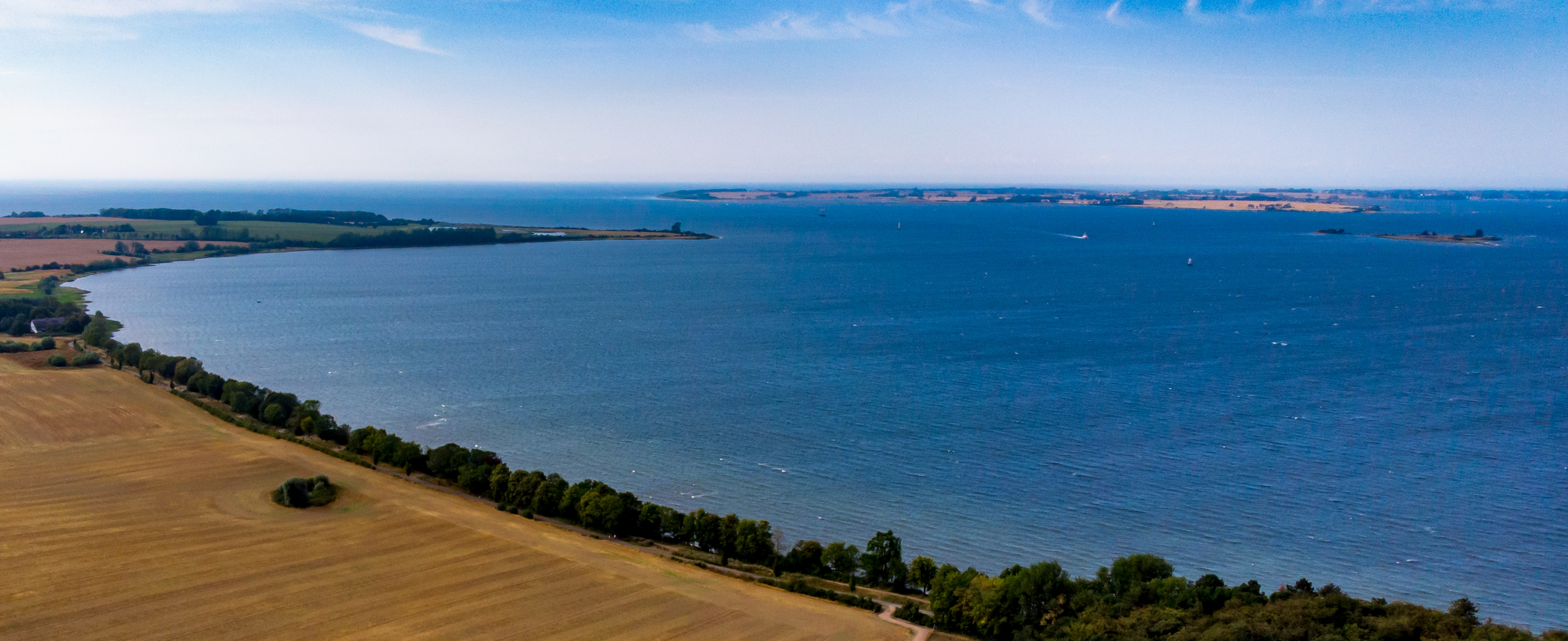

== History ==
During the Thirty Years' War there was a fortress located on the island, which today is mainly under water. Relics of this are still being discovered today through aerial archaeology.

The fortress of Walfisch was destroyed in the year 1717 after the Northern Wars.

== Literature ==
- Friedrich Schlie: Die Kunst- und Geschichts-Denkmäler des Grossherzogthums Mecklenburg-Schwerin. Vol. II: Die Amtsgerichtsbezirke Wismar, Grevesmühlen, Rehna, Gadebusch und Schwerin. Schwerin 1898. Reprint Schwerin 1992, ISBN 3-910179-06-1, pp. 23 ff., 226 ff.
- Lutz Mohr: Aufgebaute und zerstörte Eilande an der Ostseeküste der DDR. In: Greifswald-Stralsunder Jahrbuch, Vol. 11. Böhlau, Weimar 1977, pp. 17–41
- Lutz Mohr: Zwischen Walfisch und Oie. Eilande an der Ostseeküste der DDR. In: Jahrbuch der Schiffahrt. Transpress Verlag, Berlin 1986, pp. 109–117, 17 Kartenabb.
- Lutz Mohr: Die Insel Walfisch in Vergangenheit und Gegenwart. In: Naturschutz in Mecklenburg, Greifswald/Schwerin, Year 20 (double issue), No. 1/2/1977, pp. 32–35
- Gustav Willgeroth: Bilder aus Wismars Vergangenheit. Verlag Willgeroth und Menzel 1903
- Umweltministerium Mecklenburg-Vorpommern, ed. (2003), "Insel Walfisch 140", Die Naturschutzgebiete in Mecklenburg-Vorpommern, Schwerin: Demmler-Verlag, pp. 62 f., ISBN 3-910150-52-7
