= Henricus Christophorus Christianus Wegener =

Henricus Christophorus Christianus Wegener (1757–1799) was a lawyer from Wismar, Germany, working for the Dutch colonial authorities in the Dutch East Indies in the years following the French Revolution. He was from a Lutheran family. Henricus represented post-revolutionary Holland, and was at odds with the Dutch colonials in the Indies.

== Life experiences ==
Sources written 100 years later describe the tumultuous battles between Henricus and the colonials. He was sent away from Batavia by the colonials, only to return with higher powers. Some sort of physical altercation in Batavia forced him at last to flee the town and seek refuge with friends in nearby Tangerang. From there he was sent home one final time on the Holger Danske - a Danish merchant ship trading between Europe and the Indies, owned by Frédéric de Coninck and captained by one Capt. Smit. On the final journey home, the ship got into a storm at the Cape and its rudder was damaged. Rather than seeking refuge at the Cape the ship turned East and North again and entered the waters near Mozambique where it was eventually seized by the British. The reason the ship did not seek shelter at the British-occupied Cape, and the reason it was ultimately seized were the so-called English Wars (Scandinavia) and the then common practise of the British Navy to seize non-ally ships that sailed, or were suspected of sailing, goods for the French. The ship's logbook shows that prior to the seizure several people left the ship to go ashore - among these were Wegener. Family letters recount that Wegener somehow died and his body was found on the shore of Mozambique.

== Important life details ==
He had sent his two daughters, Wilhelmine and Henriette, to a boarding school in Denmark.
Near 1900 - a hundred years after Henricus' death - it is evident that he was still considered an important figure in the struggle between royalists and revolutionaries. It is evident from the sources that the nature of the conflict between Henricus and the colonial citizens in Batavia had to do with individuals' rights and freedoms.

Descendants of Henricus' daughter Henriette include Prof. Andreas Thejll da:Andreas Thejll.

A pastel miniature by Charles H. Hodges of Henricus hangs at the Museum of National History at Frederiksborg castle, Denmark.

Sources also include privately held letters and an account of one of Henricus' children.
