= Lilo Peters =

German painter and sculptor

- Born: March 17, 1913; Hamburg
- Died: April 2, 2001 (age 88); Travemünde
- Occupations: Painter; Sculptor
- Spouse: Rudolf Ferdinand Peters
- Children: 4
- Website: lilopeters.de

Lilo Peters, born Liselotte Elfriede Anna Gertrud Erdmunde Noetzel (March 17, 1913 – April 2, 2001), was a North German painter and sculptor.

== Family ==
Lilo Peters was born in Hamburg and her father was an engineer, and her mother was a milliner. In 1935, she married Rudolf "Rudi" Ferdinand Peters (1903–1944). In January 1944, her husband was drafted as a soldier in the Wehrmacht in World War II. He was killed in June 1944 in France after being taken hostage by the Resistance, leaving Peters and her four daughters behind.

== Personal life ==
After her graduation in 1933, Peters attended courses in the fine arts at the Art School of Lerchenfeld. In 1944, she had her first exhibition of paintings at Rothenbaum in Hamburg, displaying landscape watercolors and portraits. She met fellow painter Gustav Hagemann during a trip to Scandinavia in 1956, with whom she became close friends. During this time, she made many trips to Lapland, during which she created many watercolors, oil paintings and woodblock prints. Further journeys lead Peters to Egypt, Morocco, Nepal, Mexico, Guatemala and the United States. In 1977, she began to take an interest in sculpting and created numerous sculptures that are on display in Timmendorfer Strand, where she lived from 1946 until her death. There are also plenty of her sculptures on display in Carrara, Italy, where her studio was located. Until her death in 2001, she was good friends with and created artistic pieces with Eutin sculptor Pierre Schumann. Peters died from old age on April 2, 2001, in Travemünde.

Works of the artist can today publicly be seen in Timmendorfer Strand, Germany (Volleyball) and in Niendorf, Germany (wall relief).

== Exhibitions ==
- 1944 Heimerdinger at the Rothenbaum
- 1948 GEDOK in the Thalia Theater
- 1950 Helms Museum Harburg
- 1964 Kunstverein Skelefteå (Sweden)
- 1975 Exhibition Gallery of People in Hamburg, exhibitions in various countries, for example, in Morocco, India, Nepal, and South Africa
- 1987 Neustadt, Bonn with East Holstein artists
- 1993 Retrospective 1993 in Timmendorfer Strand
- 2000 Galerie Schlossgarten in Eutin

== Media coverage ==
- In a 1998 documentary (40 minutes, director Claudia Fink): "Style is something completely different – for example, look at the painter and sculptor Lilo Peters."
