= Breitling (Bay of Wismar) =

Strait in the Baltic Sea

Coordinates: 53°59′N 11°29′E

The Breitling as part of the Bay of Wismar

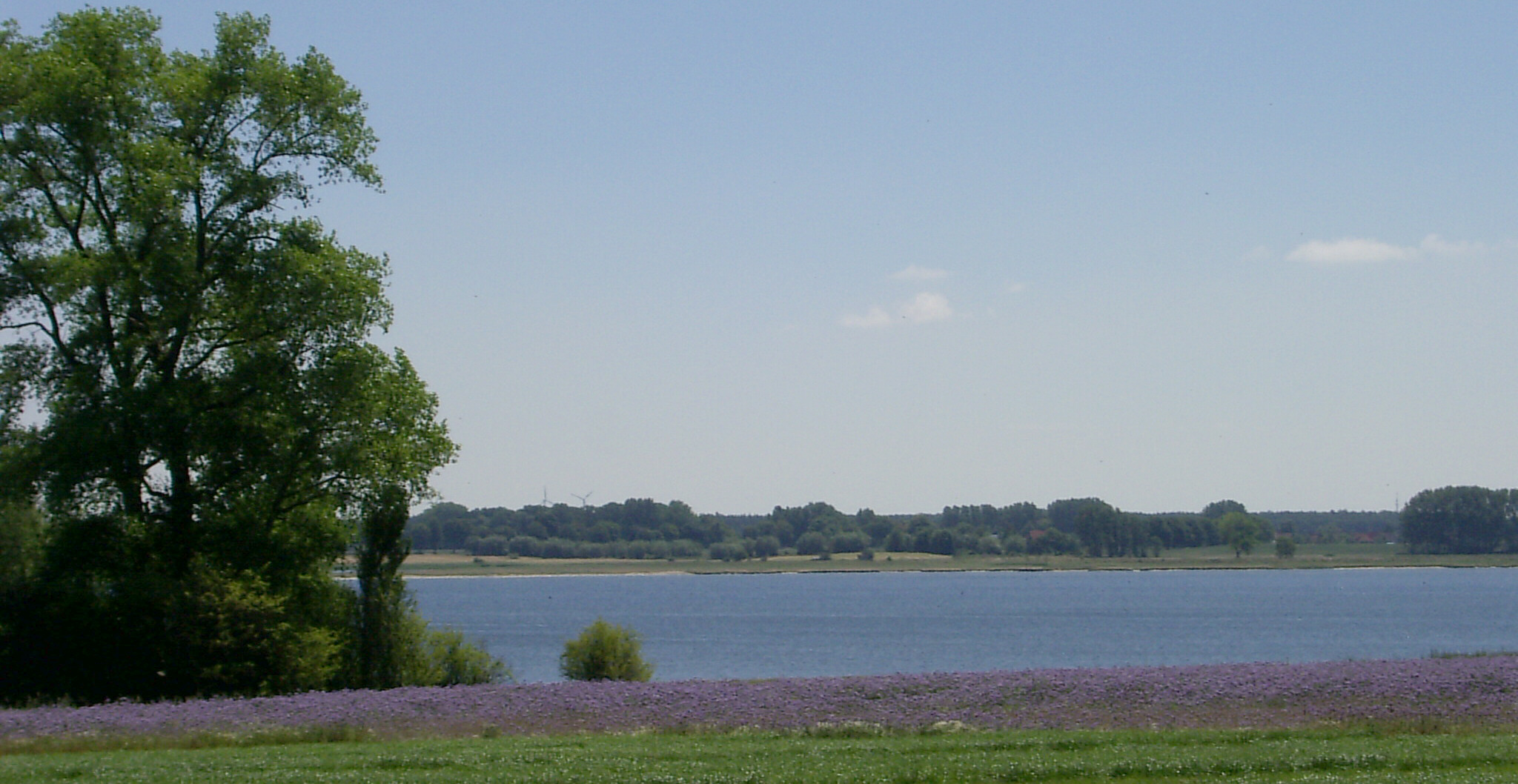
The Breitling between Poel and the mainland

The Breitling is a narrow strait in the Baltic Sea between the island of Poel and the mainland in the northeast of the district of Nordwestmecklenburg. It links the sheltered part of the Bay of Wismar, beginning south of Poeldamm, with the Salzhaff (into which estuaries of the Zaufe and Gollwitz empty).

The Breitling is a very shallow body of water, mostly under one metre in depth. Large parts can even become exposed at low water, whereas at high water it can cover the low-lying causeway known as the Poeldamm. In the south the road link runs along a causeway (the Poeldamm) over a low peninsula to Poel over the Breitling. The waterbody is about five kilometres long and no more than one kilometre wide.

== Flora and fauna ==
The landscape alternates between short stretches of steep shoreline on the mainland side, on the southern shores of the small islands of Baumwerder and Ahrendsberg and very shallow areas subject to flooding. This is indicated by salt grasslands with alluvial islands and shores, interspersed with creeks. The higher areas are usually very dry and are characterised by arid vegetation such as poor, dry grassland with thorn bushes.
