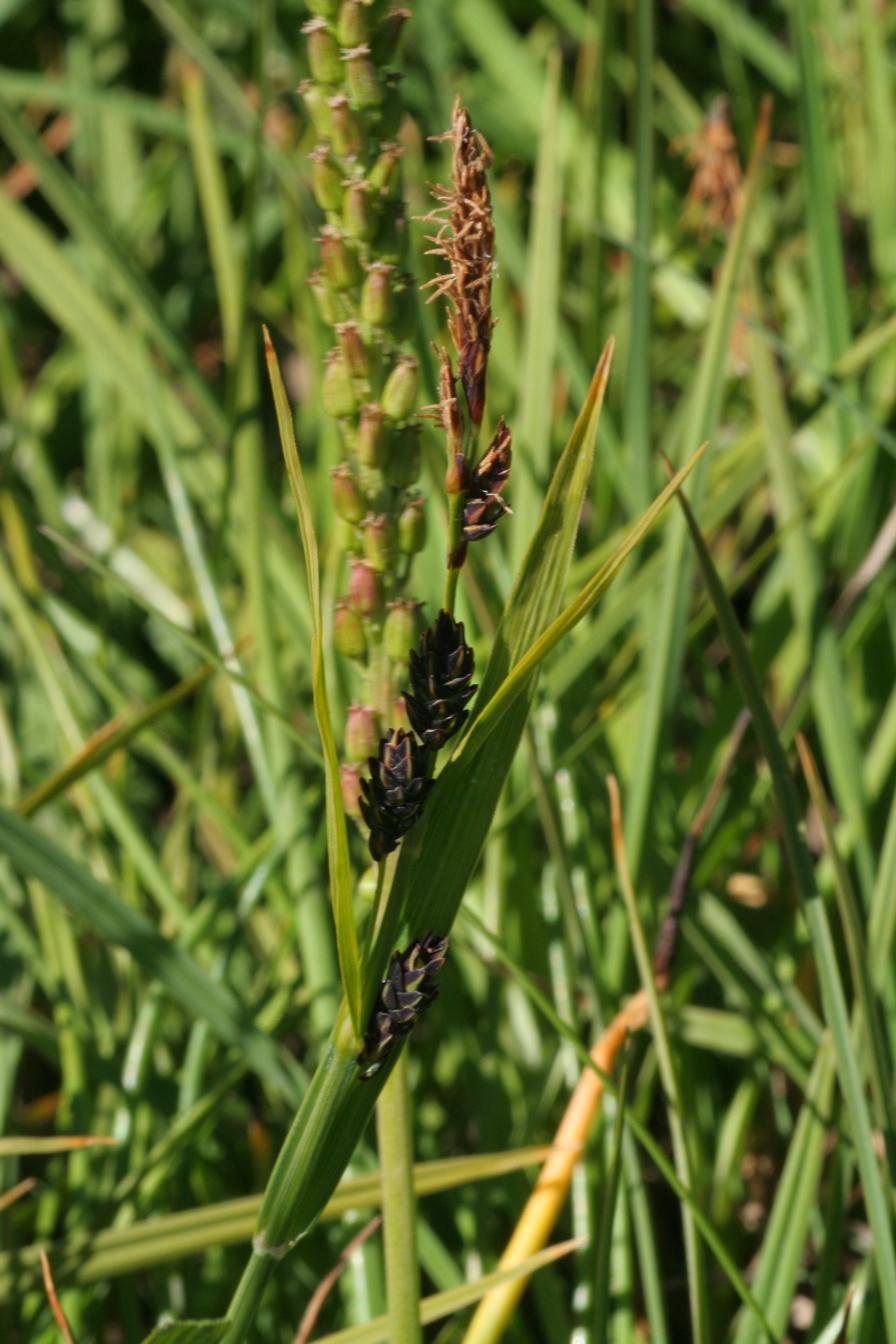
- Carex Salina

Scientific classification
- Kingdom: Plantae
- Clade: Tracheophytes
- Clade: Angiosperms
- Clade: Monocots
- Clade: Commelinids
- Order: Poales
- Family: Cyperaceae
- Genus: Carex
- Species: C. salina

Binomial name
- Carex salina Wahlenb., 1803

= Carex salina =

Species of sedge

Carex salina, also known as saltmarsh sedge, is a species of flowering plant in the sedge family, Cyperaceae. It is native to Eastern Canada , Norway, and parts of Northern Russia.

== See also ==
- List of Carex species
