= Wismar =

Wismar Wismer (Low German)
- Town
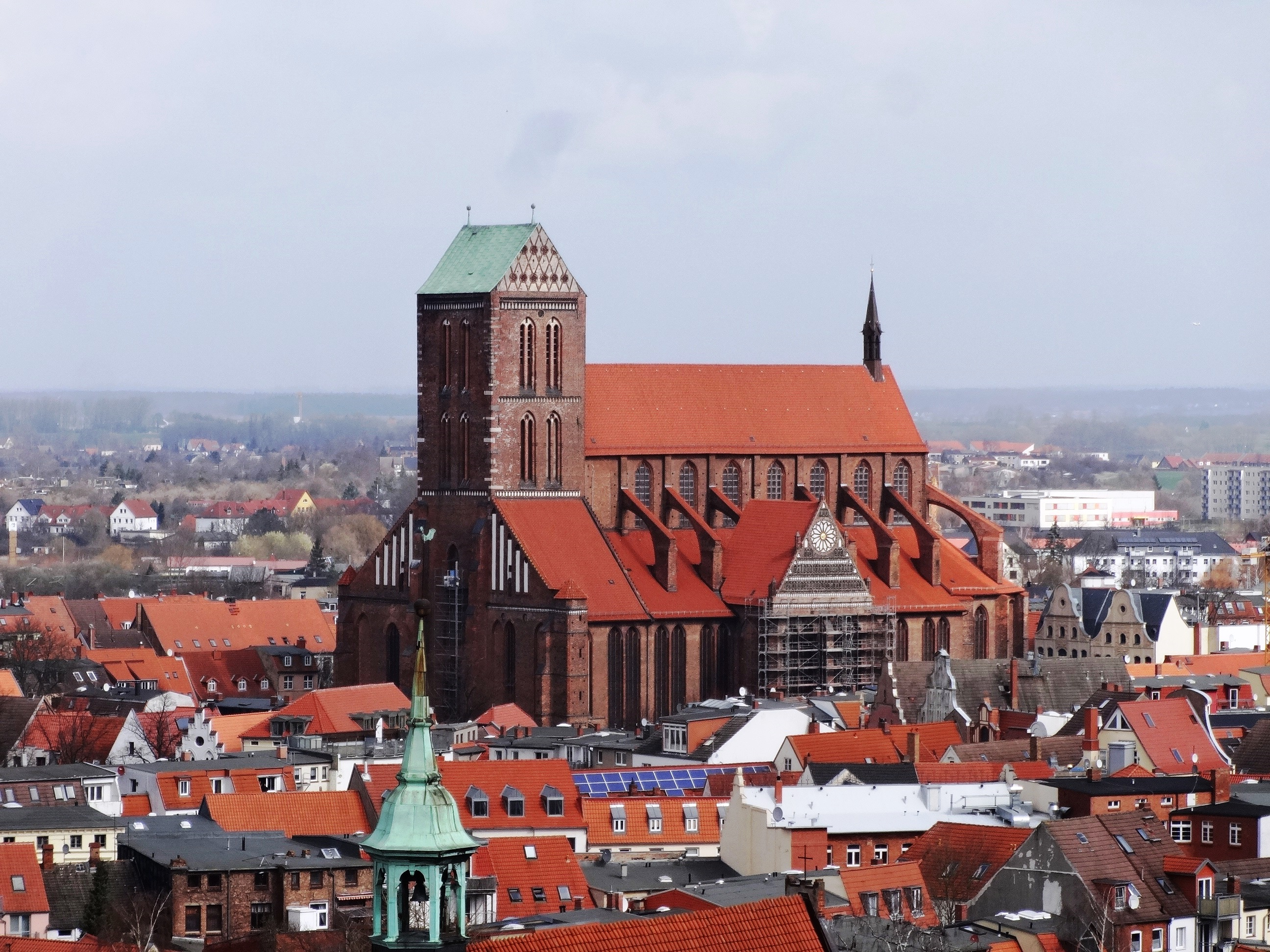
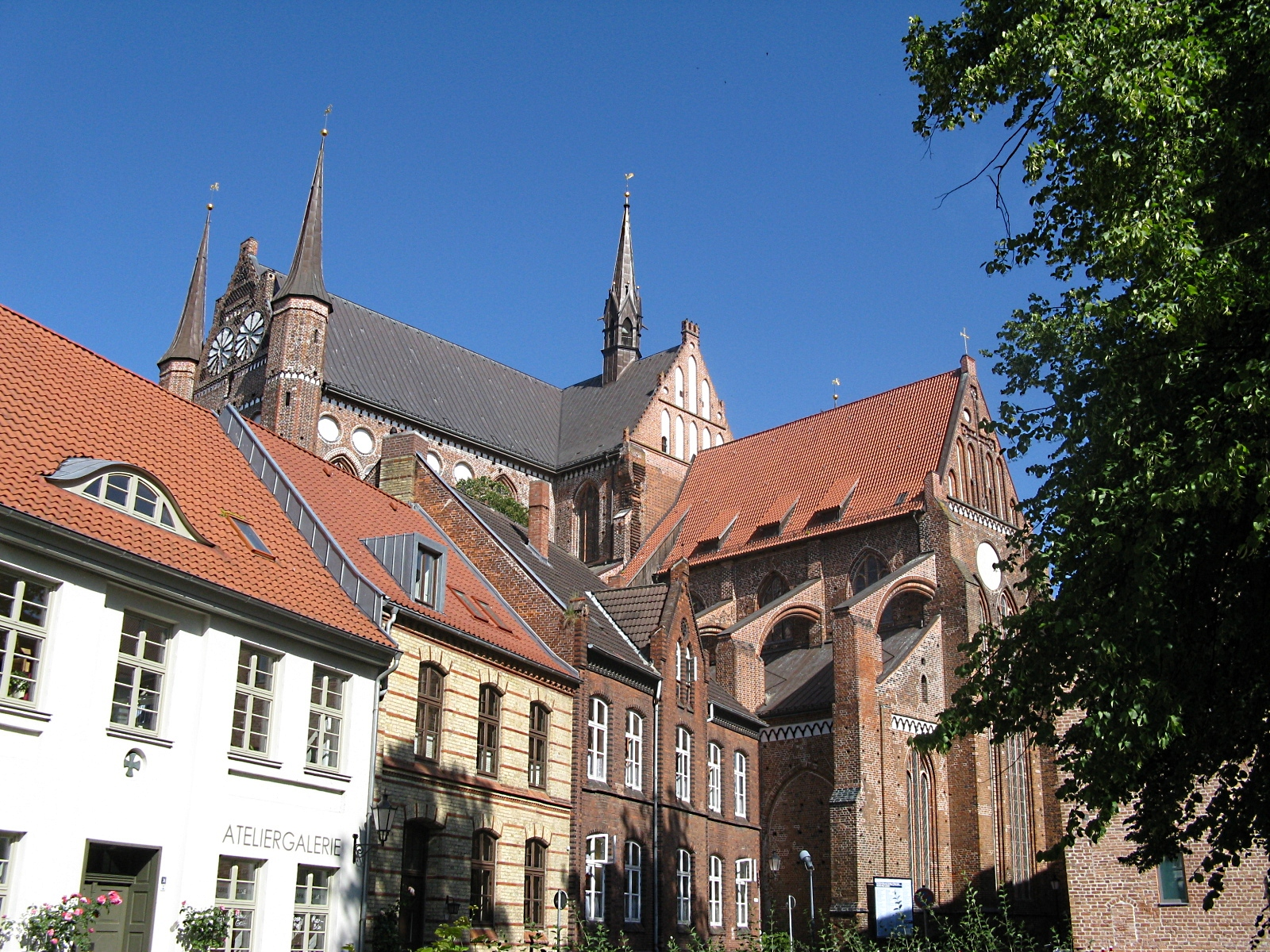
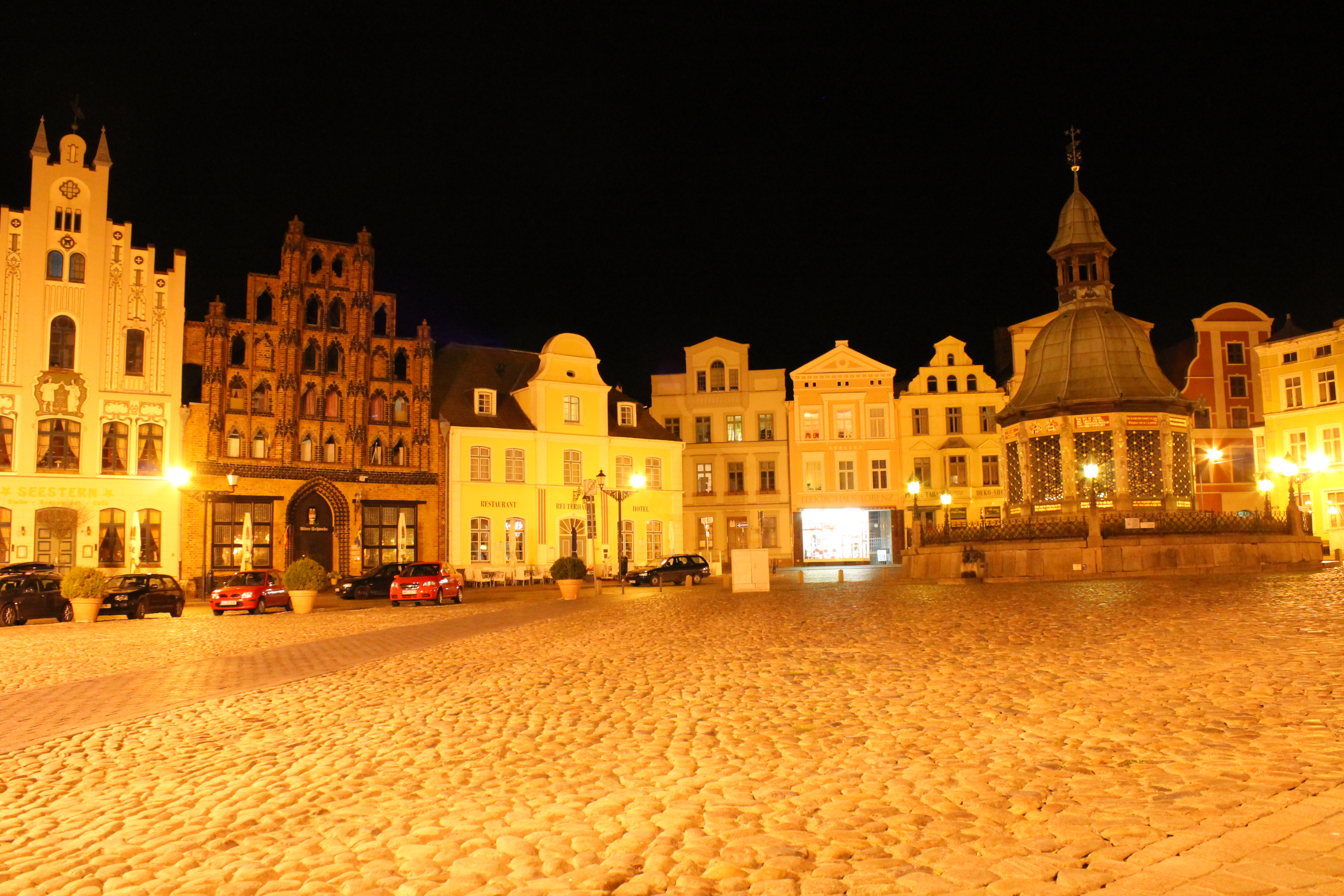
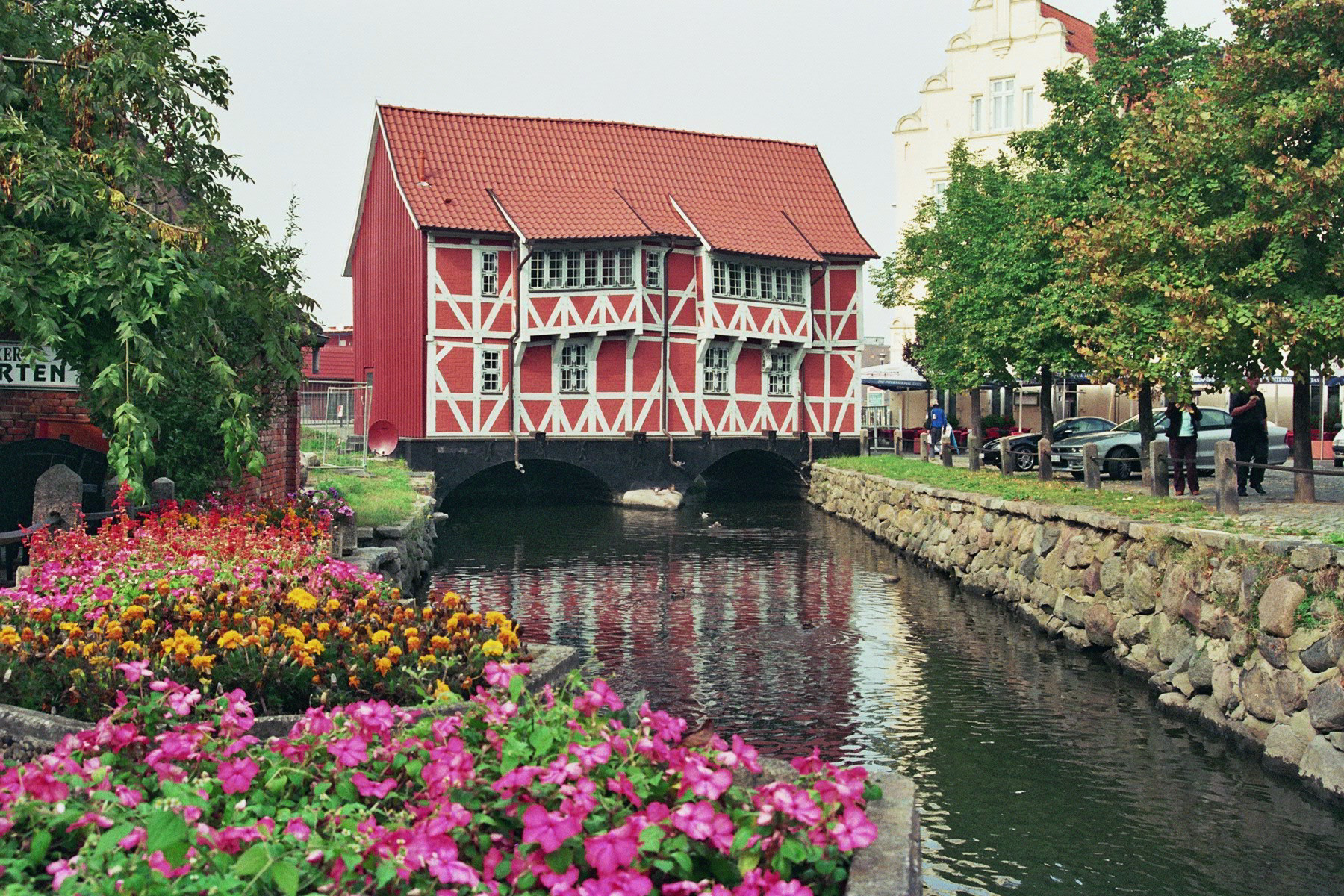
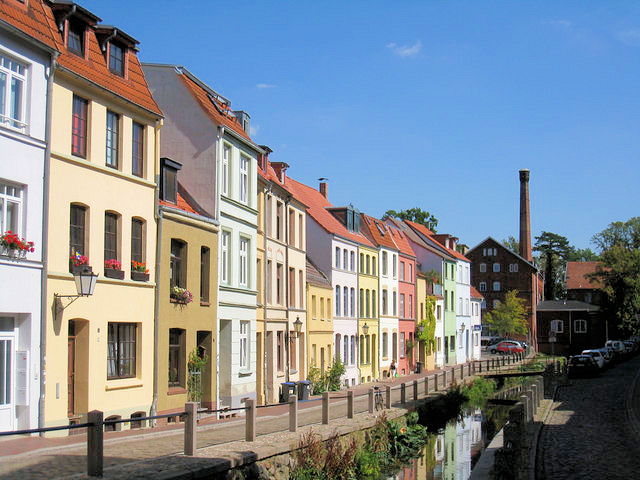
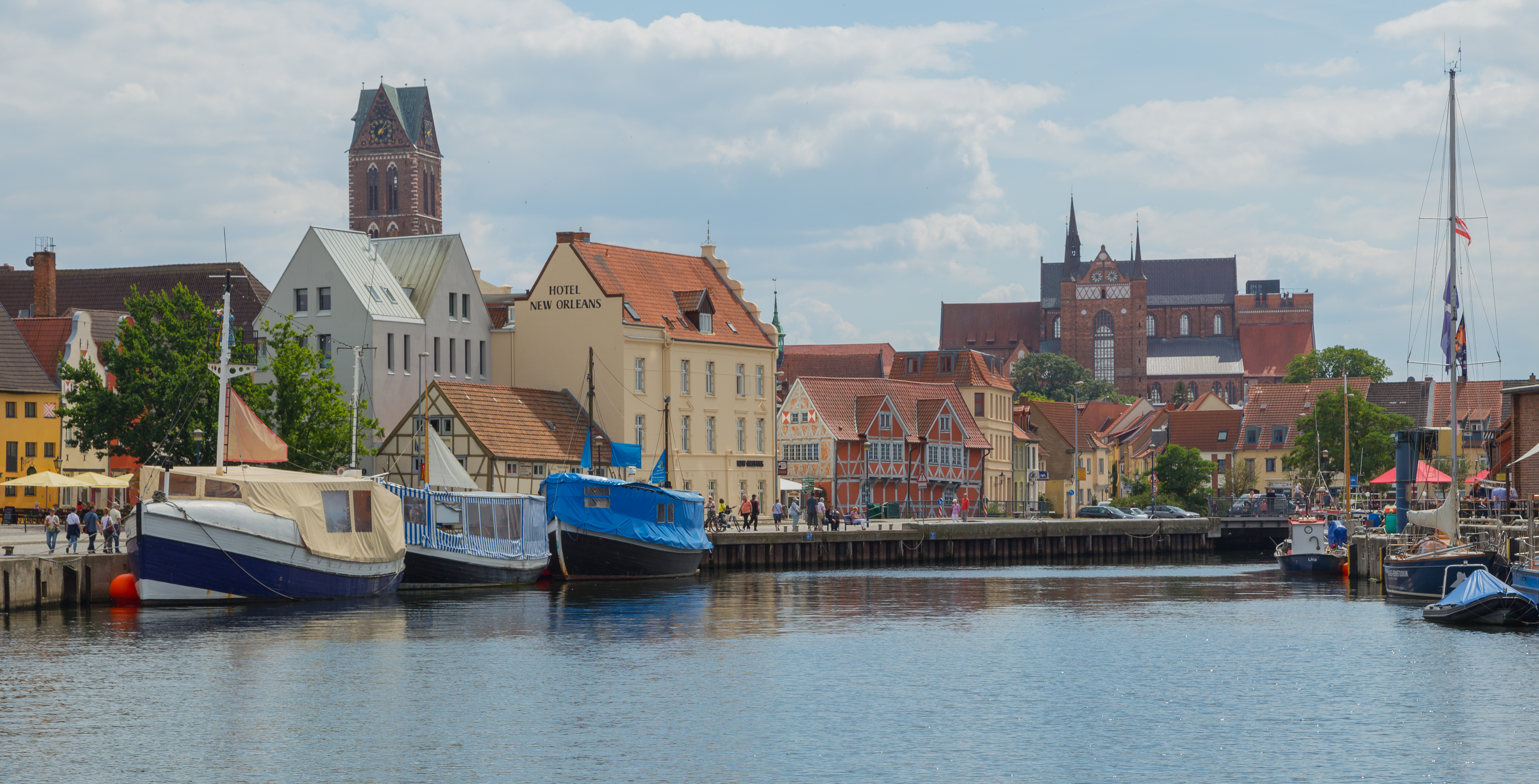
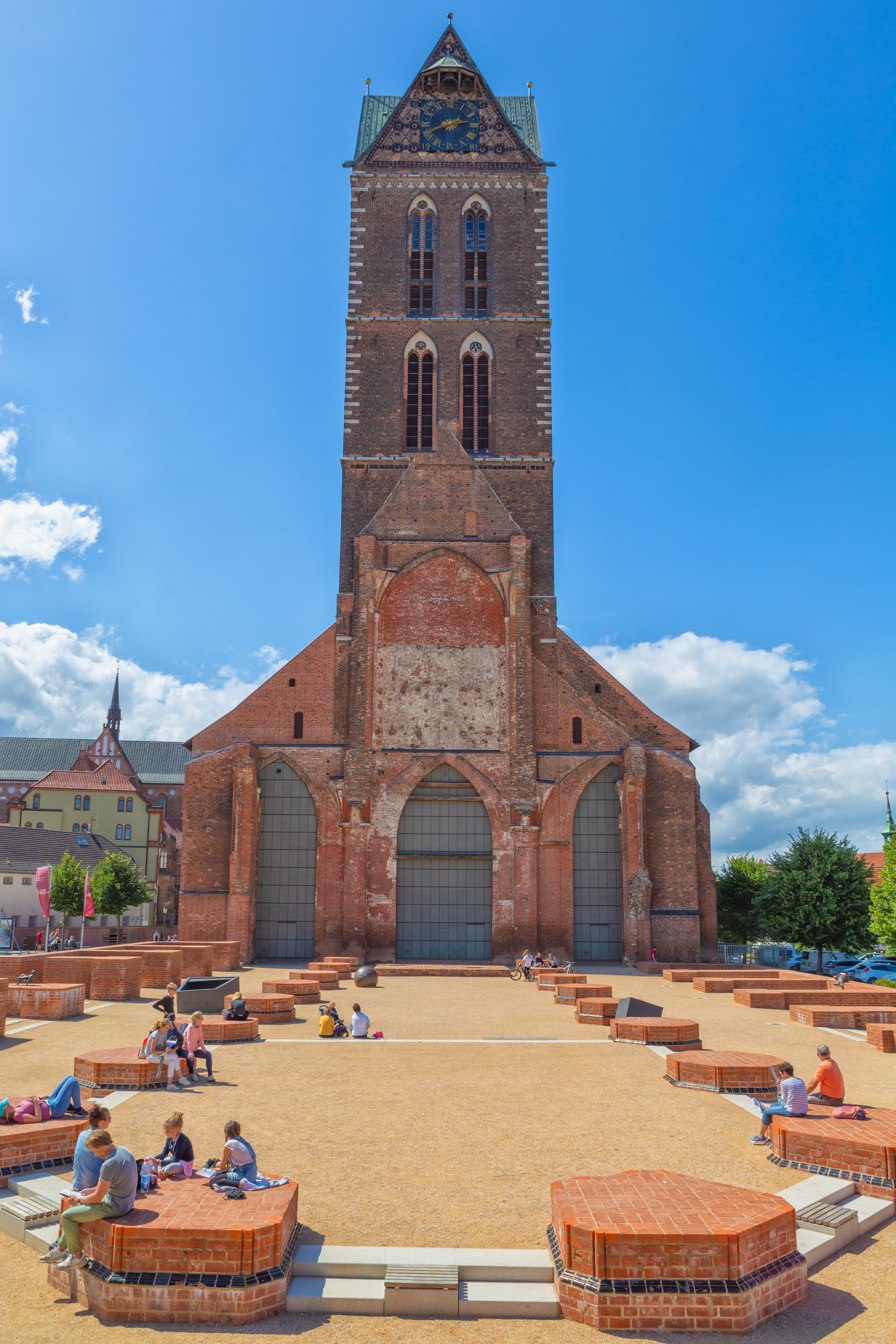
- St. Nicholas Church St George's Church Market Square Gewölbe Mühlengrube Old Harbour St Mary's Church

- Flag Coat of arms

- Location of Wismar within Nordwestmecklenburg district
- Interactive map of Wismar
- Location within Germany Location within Mecklenburg-Vorpommern
- Coordinates: 53°54′N 11°28′E
- Country: Germany
- State: Mecklenburg-Vorpommern
- District: Nordwestmecklenburg

Government
  - Mayor (2018–25): Thomas Beyer (SPD)

Area
  - Total: 41.72 km^{2} (16.11 sq mi)
- Elevation: 15 m (49 ft)

Population (2025-12-31)
  - Total: 43,103
  - Density: 1,033/km^{2} (2,676/sq mi)
- Time zone: UTC+01:00 (CET)
  - Summer (DST): UTC+02:00 (CEST)
- Postal codes: 23952, 23966, 23968, 23970
- Dialling codes: 03841
- Vehicle registration: HWI
- Website: www.wismar.de

Wismar (German pronunciation: [ˈvɪsmaʁ]; Low German: Wismer), officially the Hanseatic City of Wismar (German: Hansestadt Wismar) is, with around 43,000 inhabitants, the sixth-largest city of the northeastern German state of Mecklenburg-Vorpommern, and the fourth-largest city of Mecklenburg after Rostock, Schwerin and Neubrandenburg. The city was the third-largest port city in former East Germany after Rostock and Stralsund.

Wismar is located on the Bay of Wismar of the Baltic Sea, directly opposite the island of Poel, that separates the Bay of Wismar from the larger Bay of Mecklenburg. The city lies in the middle between the two larger port cities of Lübeck in the west, and Rostock in the east, and the state capital of Schwerin is located south of the city on Lake Schwerin. Wismar lies in the northeastern corner of the Hamburg Metropolitan Region, and is the capital of the district of Northwestern Mecklenburg. The city's natural harbour is protected by a promontory. The uninhabited island of Walfisch, lying between Wismar and the island of Poel, administratively belongs to the borough of Wismar-Wendorf.

It is estimated that Wismar was founded in 1226 under Henry Borwin I, Lord of Mecklenburg from the House of Mecklenburg, a German dynasty of Slavic origin also known as the Obotrites or Niklotides. In 1259, the city became part of the Hanseatic League. Throughout its history, the city has been under control of various German states as well as the Swedish Empire. It was part of Sweden from 1648 until 1803 (de jure until 1903, when Sweden officially renounced its claims to the city), and this Swedish chapter of the city is celebrated annually with a large "Sweden Celebration". From 1815 until 1918, Wismar lay in the Grand Duchy of Mecklenburg-Schwerin and later in the Free State of Mecklenburg-Schwerin.

Wismar is a typical representative of the Hanseatic League with its city-wide Brick Gothic structures and iconic gabled patrician houses and was inscribed on the UNESCO World Heritage List alongside the historical old town of Stralsund in 2002. Wismar is the seat of Hochschule Wismar, a university of applied sciences, one of nine institutions of higher education in Mecklenburg-Vorpommern. With MV Werften Wismar, the city is one of three cruise ship-producing locations of MV Werften (along with Rostock and Stralsund), and the shipyard with its tall white-blue hall is one of the city's largest employers. St. George's, St. Nicholas' and St. Mary's, of which only the tower is left standing, are the three iconic sacred buildings dominating the skyline of Wismar.

== History ==
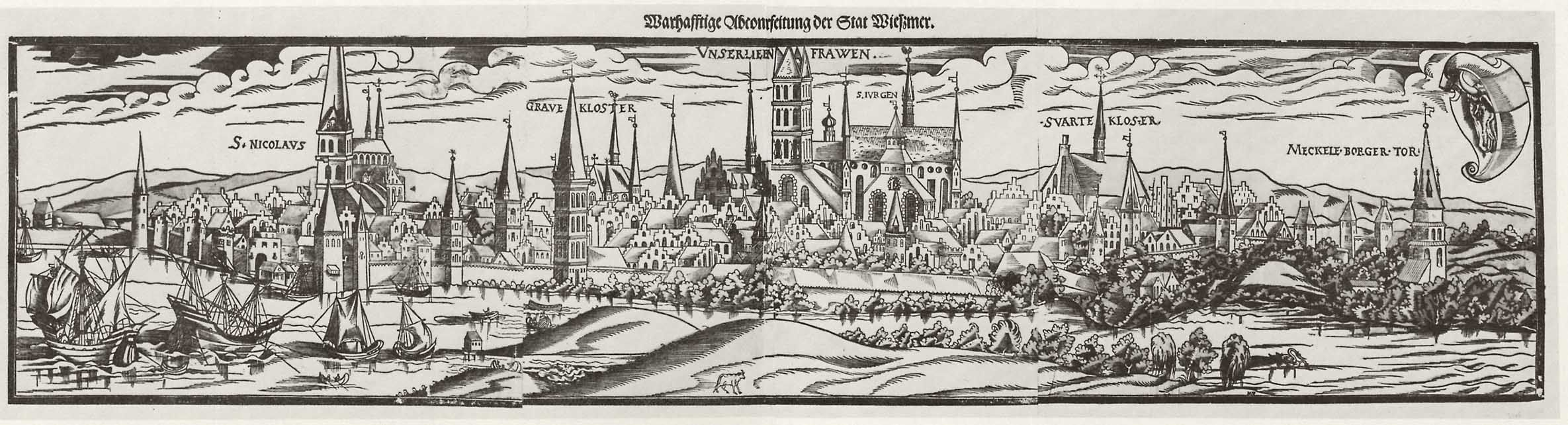
Wismar in the 16th century

The name of the settlement was first recorded in the 12th century as Visemer, Wismar (1147, 1167), Wyssemaria (1229) and is probably of Slavic origin although finally disputed. Wismar could have the same Old Saxon origin like the German city Weimar. Wismar was part of the Western Slavic Obotrites' territory.

The exact date of the city's foundation is not clear. In the oldest existing document of Wismar from 1229, its civic rights are already established. In 1301 Wismar came under the rule of the House of Mecklenburg. In 1259 Wismar joined a defensive agreement with Lübeck and Rostock, in order to effectively counter the numerous Baltic pirates. Subsequently more cities of the northern Holy Roman Empire would agree to cooperate as commerce and trade was increasingly coordinated and regulated. These policies would provide the basis for the development of the Hanseatic League. By the 13th and 14th centuries Wismar had grown into a flourishing Hanseatic trading hub and an important center of wool processing. Although around 2,000 of its inhabitants perished during the plague of 1376, the town remained reasonably prosperous until the 16th century.

=== Under Swedish rule ===
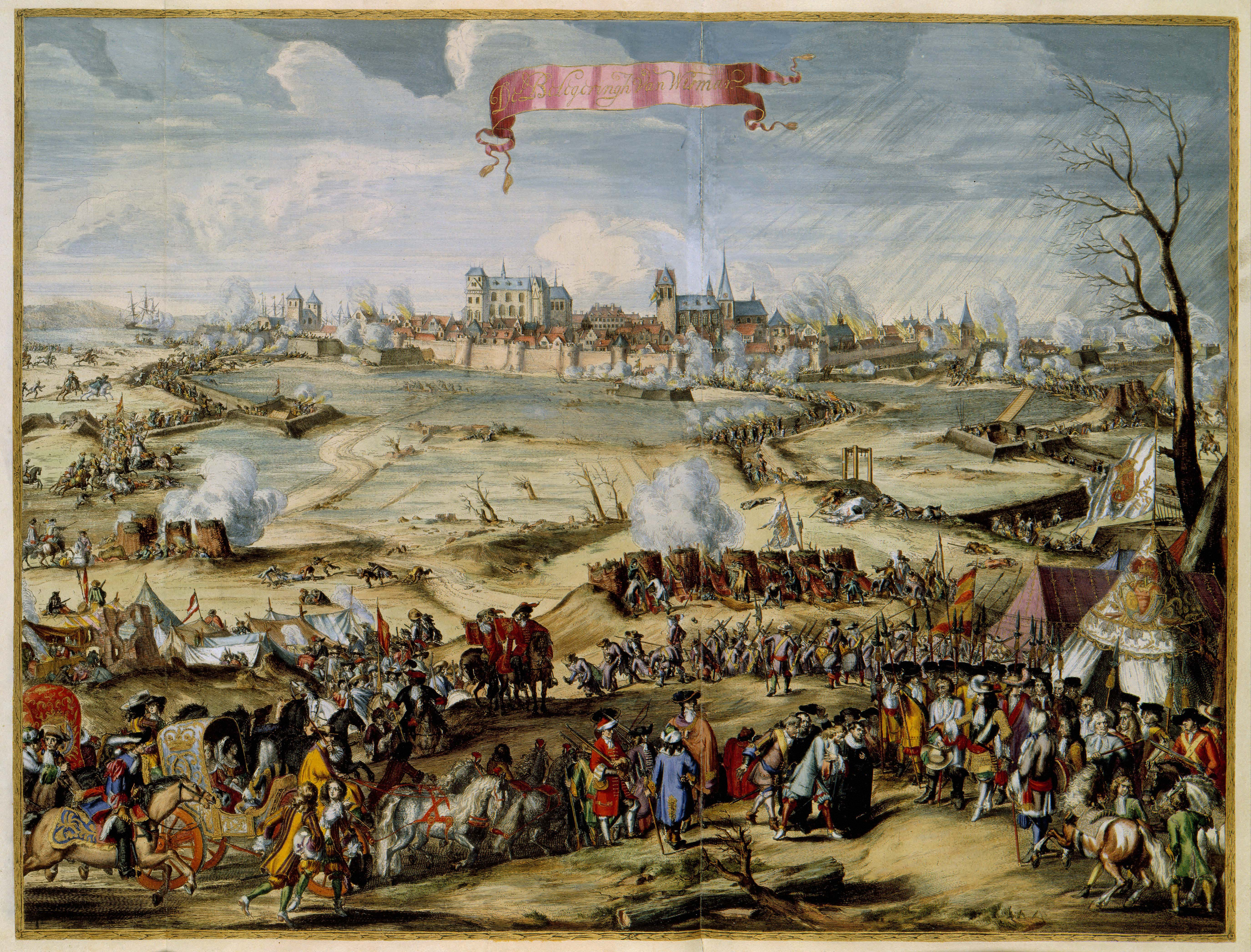
Siege of Wismar 1675

Wismar
UNESCO World Heritage Site
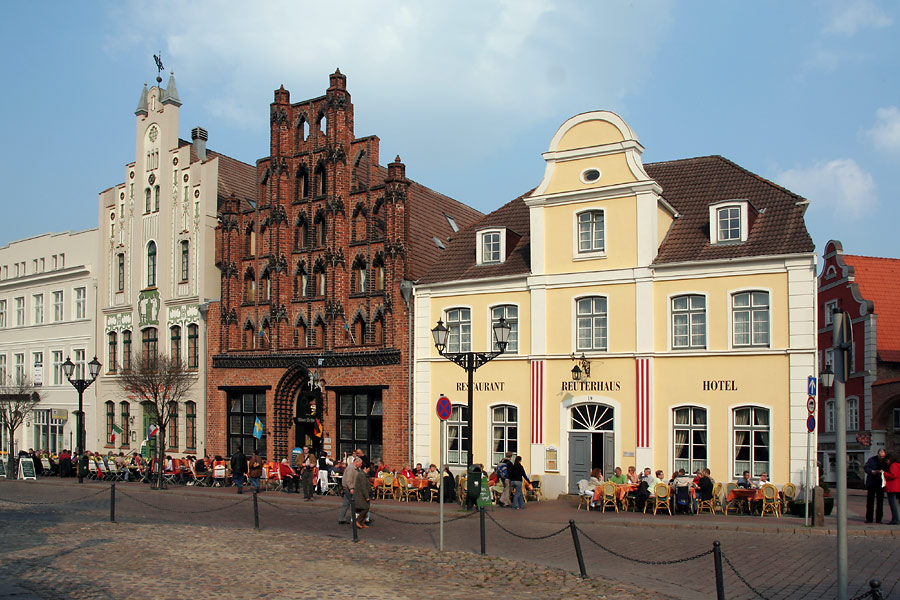
- Alter Schwede, c. 1380
- Interactive map of Wismar
- Part of: Historic Centres of Stralsund and Wismar
- Criteria: Cultural: ii, iv
- Reference: 1067-002
- Inscription: 2002 (26th Session)
- Area: 88 ha (220 acres)
- Buffer zone: 108 ha (270 acres)

With the Peace of Westphalia of 1648 Wismar came under the territorial control of Sweden. Through the acquisition of Wismar and other dominions in the Holy Roman Empire, the Kings of Sweden in their role as imperial princes were entitled to a seat in the Imperial Diet. Wismar became administrative center of Wismar town and the districts of Pod and Neukloster, and after 1653 the Fürstenhof (prince's court) served as the seat of the supreme court for all Swedish dominions in the Holy Roman Empire. Wismar's fortifications were extended into an effective all-round defence system under the supervision of Field Marshal Erik Dahlbergh. Remains of these fortifications have been preserved, among other places, in the ‘Lindengarten' to the east of the wall of the old city. During the Scanian War, the town was besieged and captured by Danish forces in 1675.

In 1803, Sweden ceded both the town and lordship to the Grand Duchy of Mecklenburg-Schwerin for 1,258,000 Riksdalers, but reserved the right of redemption after 100 years. In view of this contingent right of Sweden, Wismar was not represented at the diet of Mecklenburg-Schwerin until 1897. In 1903, Sweden finally renounced its claims to the town. Wismar still retains a few relics of its old privileges, including the right to fly its own flag.

=== 20th century ===
By the end of the 19th century Wismar's most important manufacturing branches were the production of iron and steel, roofing-felt, asphalt, paper and machine industry. International sea trade took place at the local harbour, which was deep enough to admit vessels of up to five metres (16 ft) draught at its quays. Exports included grains, oil-seeds and butter as coal, timber and iron were imported. Wismar was production site for several railroad rolling stock manufacturers and since 1933 home to Norddeutsche Dornier-Werke of aircraft manufacturer Dornier. On 14 May 1881 Rudolph Karstadt opened his first shop (Tuch-, Manufaktur- und Konfektionsgeschäft) of the now well established department store chain Karstadt in Wismar.

During World War II, it was the location of a forced labour subcamp of the Nazi prison in Bützow-Dreibergen. Wismar was heavily bombed and destroyed by Allied air raids. As the line of contact between Soviet and other Allied armies formed in Europe at the end of the war, Wismar was captured by the British 6th Airborne Division's 1st Canadian Parachute Battalion on 2 May 1945, James Hill commanding, in accordance with Operation Eclipse. On 7 May 1945 British Field Marshal Montgomery and Soviet Marshal Konstantin Rokossovsky met in Wismar. In accord with the Occupation Zone Agreements of the Yalta Conference Wismar became a part of the Soviet Occupation Zone of Germany on 1 July 1945, as British troops retreated and Soviet troops took control over the area.

During the 1949 to 1990 era of the German Democratic Republic, Wismar became East Germany's second-largest port, after Rostock and developed a shipbuilding industry. Although the GDR government had pledged to restore the local churches and historic sites that had been heavily bombed during the war, this commitment was for the most part not fulfilled.

After German reunification in 1990, churches and all historic buildings in the city's town center were restored, and the old towns of Wismar and Stralsund (c. 110 km or 70 mi to the east), were listed as UNESCO World Heritage Sites. In 2011, Wismar became the capital of the district of Nordwestmecklenburg.

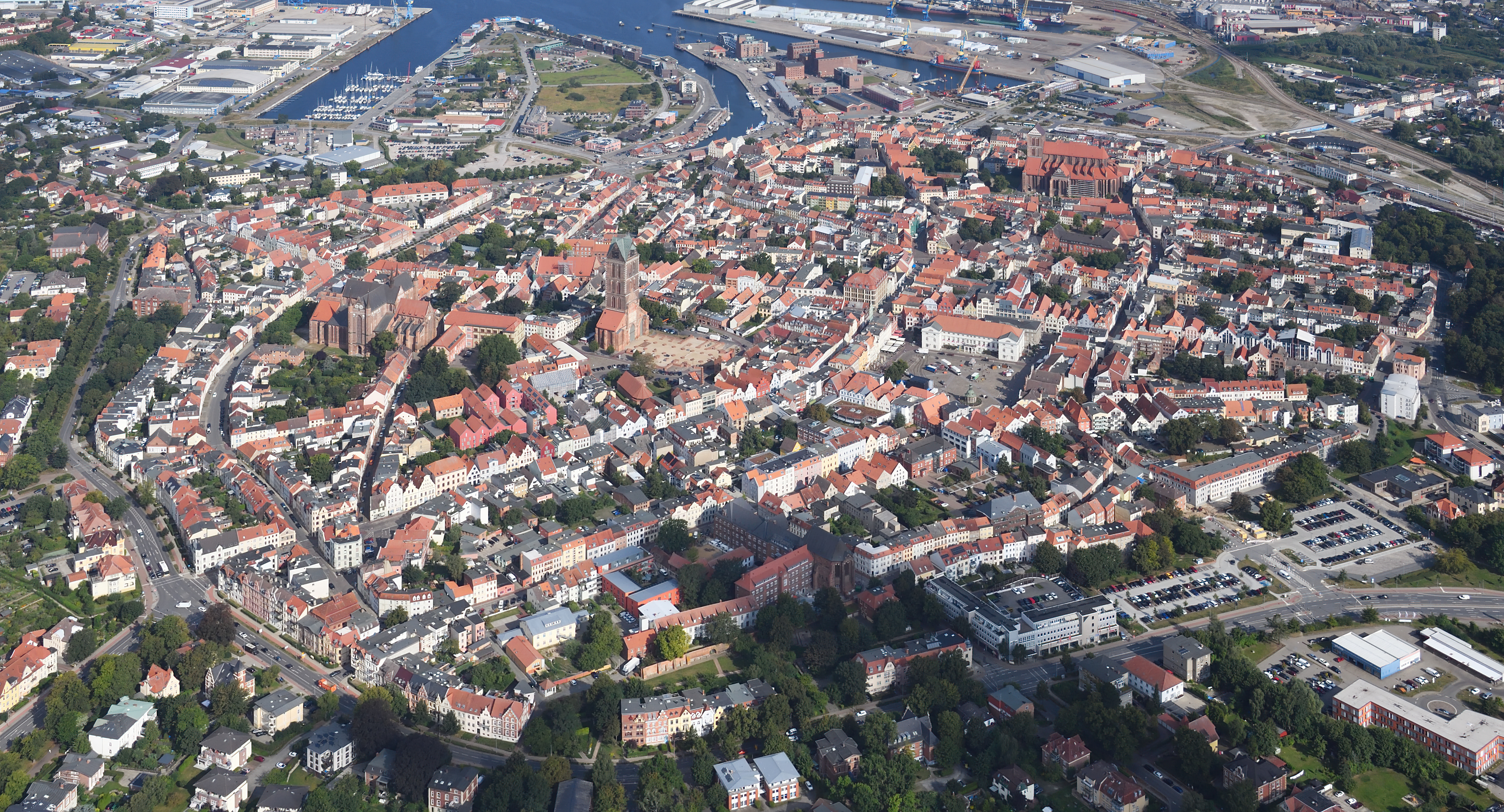
View over the city

== Mayors and Lord Mayors ==
- 1919–1929: Lawyer Hans Rasp (1877–1957, SPD)
- 1929–1933: Heinrich Brechling (1897–1959, SPD)
- 1933–1945: Alfred Pleuger (NSDAP)
- May 1945 – June 1945: Heinrich von Biel (independent)
- June 1945 – August 1945: Heinz Adolf Janert (1897–1973) (independent)
- August 1945 – 1945: Karl Keuscher (KPD)
- September 1945 – 1945: August Wilke (KPD)
- December 1945 – December 1950: Herbert Säverin (1906–1987) (SPD/SED)
- January 1951 – June 1952 Erhard Holweger (1911–1976) (SED)
- August 1953 – June 1957: Herbert Kolm (SED)
- July 1957 – April 1969: Herbert Fiegert (SED)
- April 1969 – November 1989: Günter Lunow (born 1926) (SED)
- November 1989 – May 1990: Wolfram Flemming (SED), temporary
- 1990–2010: Rosemarie Wilcken (born 1947) (SPD)
- July 2010 – July 2026: Thomas Beyer (born 1960) (SPD)
- since July 2026: Frank Junge (born 1967) (SPD)

== Sights and architecture ==
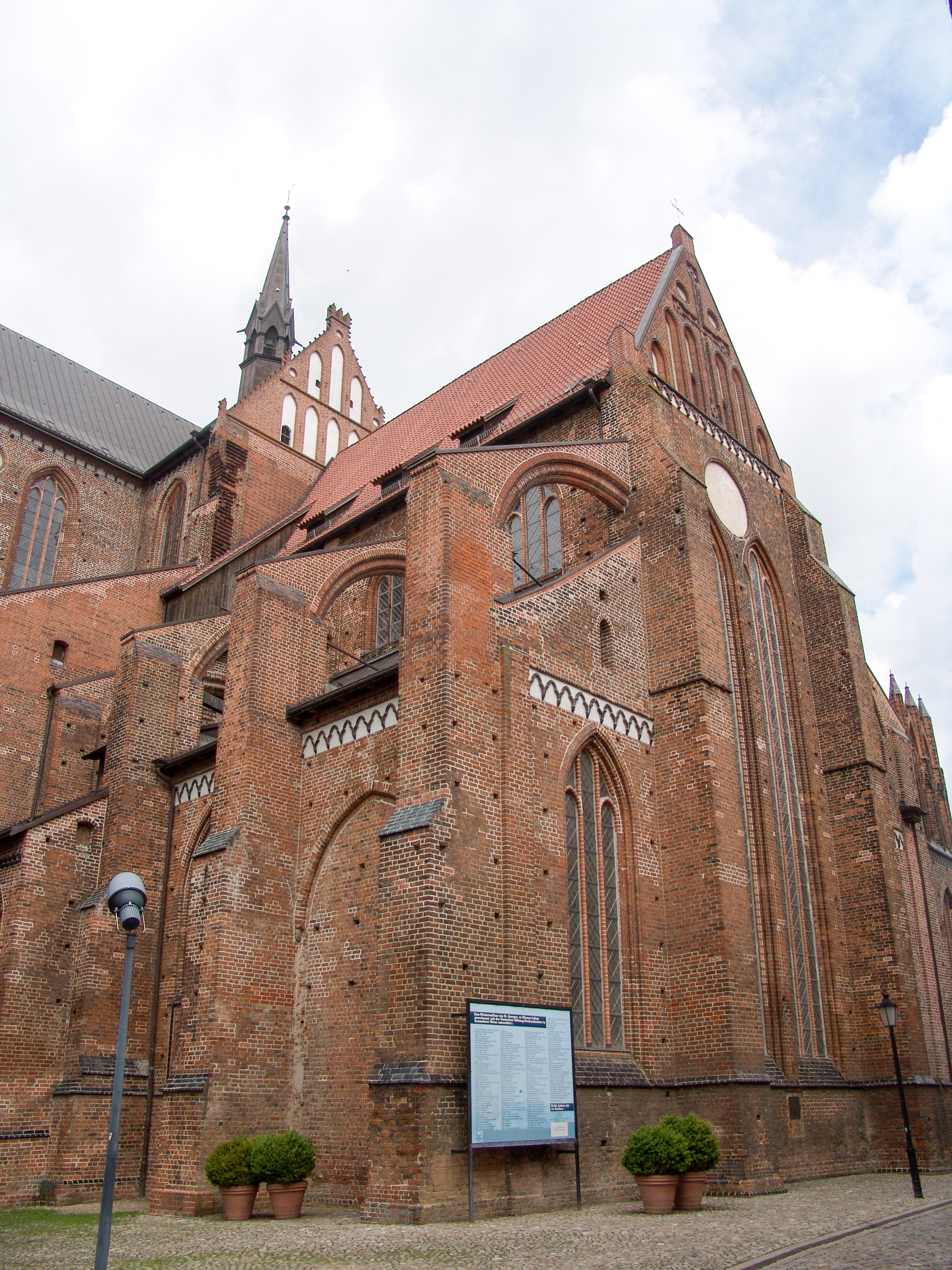
Reconstruction of the Medieval Gothic Georgenkirche (St. George's Church) was completed in 2010.

The historic old town, centered on the huge marketplace (one of the largest in northern Germany at 10,000 m^{2} or 110,000 sq ft), is characterized by town houses, manufacture and trading structures of the Hanseatic League, built in Brick Gothic style during the 13th to 15th centuries, 19th-century Romanesque Revival architecture and Art Nouveau houses. Distinctive buildings and military works, built during the period of Swedish control during the 17th and the 18th centuries provide another layer of cultural influence.

The market square's focal point is the Wasserkunst, an elaborate wrought-iron fountain imported from Holland in 1602. The northern side of the square is occupied by the Town Hall, built in Neoclassical style from 1817 to 1819. Another notable building on the square is a Brick Gothic patrician's home (Bürgerhaus) called Alter Schwede (Old Swede), erected around 1380.

St. George's Church, the third so-named edifice on the site, dates from 1404. It had escaped major damage during most of World War II, but on 14 April 1945, three weeks before the end of the war it was badly damaged by "Blockbuster bombs" dropped by the British Royal Air Force. Reconstruction after German reunification, costing some 40 million Euros, was completed in 2010.

The 80-metre-high (260 ft) tower church of St. Mary's Church (Marienkirche) is the only remainder of the original Brick Gothic edifice, built during the first half of the 13th century. It suffered heavy damage in World War II and was partially razed in 1960 during the East German era.

St. Mary's Church and the church of St. Nicholas (Nikolaikirche) with its very lofty vaulting, built from 1381 to 1460, serve as prime examples of Lübeck's St. Mary's Churches architectural influence on the entire region.

The Fürstenhof, a richly decorated specimen of early Italian Renaissance style was once a ducal residence and served later as the seat of the municipal authorities. Built from 1552 to 1565, it was restored from 1877 to 1879. The Old School, dating from about 1300, has not been restored yet. The town hall, rebuilt in 1829, houses a gallery of paintings. The Fine Arts Municipal Gallery Baumhaus is located in the old harbour area.

== Education ==
- Hochschule Wismar – University of Technology, Business and Design

== Transport ==
The nearest major airport is Hamburg Airport, located 131 km (81 mi) to the south west of Wismar.

== Economy ==
Thyssenkrupp Marine Systems is a German shipyard located in Wismar owned by TKMS (TKMS AG & Co. KGaA) for the construction of naval vessels, including submarines and research vessels. Shipbuilding has existed since 1946 at the site.

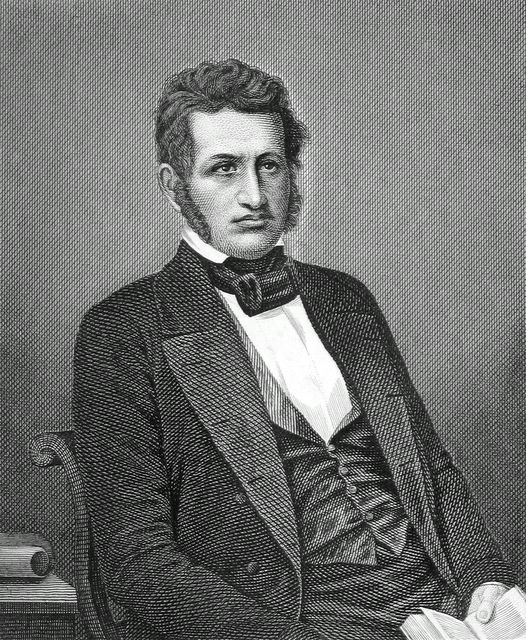
Friedrich Christoph Dahlmann

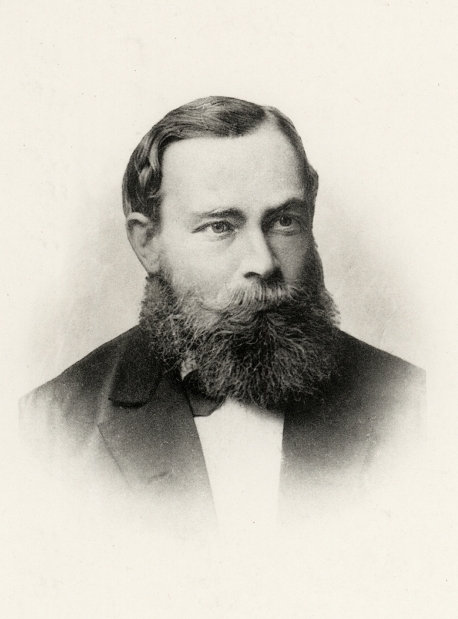
Gottlob Frege around 1879

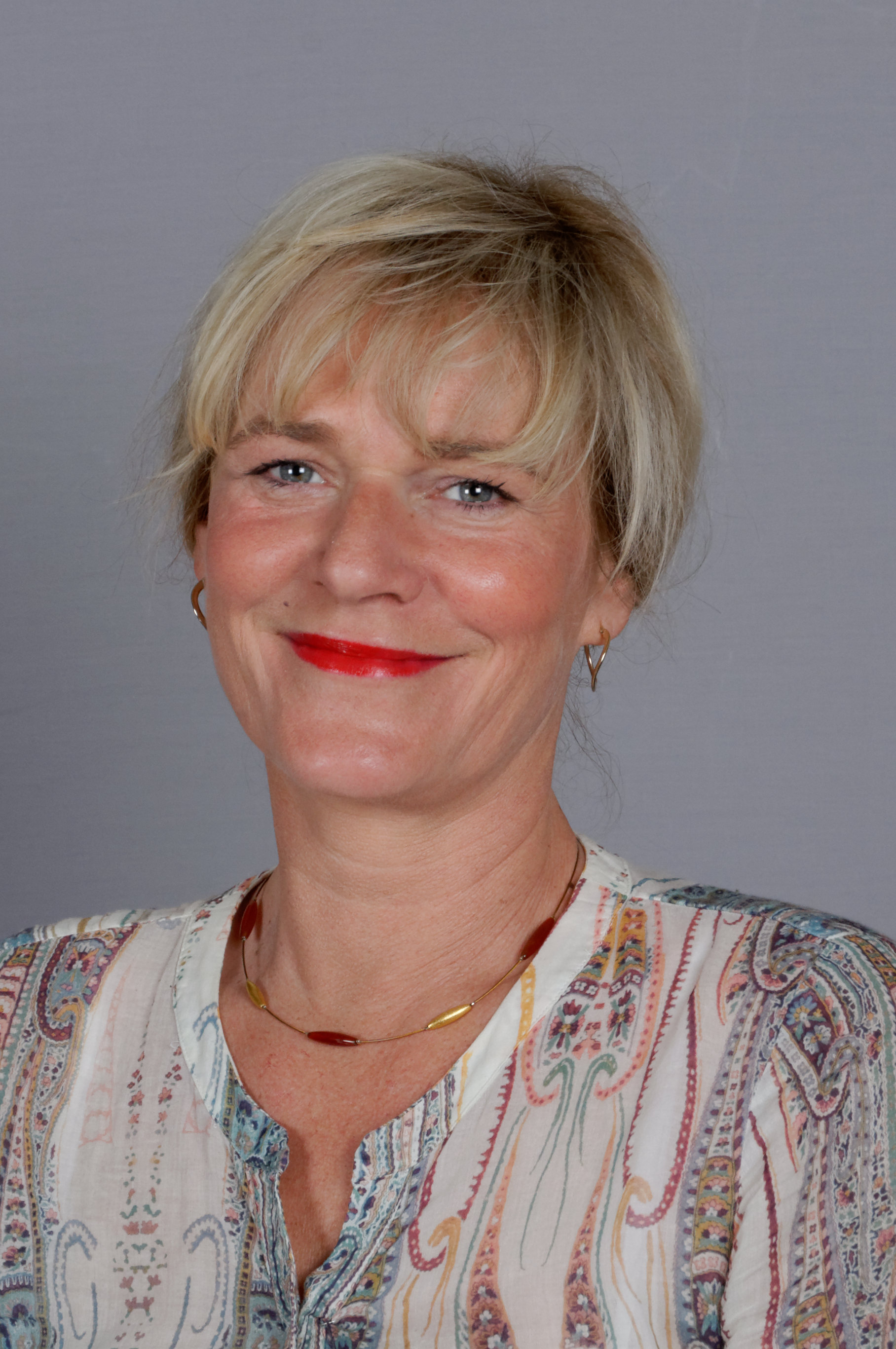
Simone Oldenburg, 2017

== Notable people ==
- Klaus Störtebeker (c. 1360–1401), privateer
- Sophie of Mecklenburg-Güstrow (1557–1631), queen of Denmark and Norway
- Daniel Georg Morhof (1639–1691), writer, scholar and historian
- Johan Henrik Scheffel (1690–1781), Swedish painter
- Johan Carl Wilcke (1732–1796), physicist
- Henricus Christophorus Christianus Wegener (1757–1799), lawyer
- Friedrich Christoph Dahlmann (1785–1860), historian, statesman.
- Heinrich Keil (1822–1894), philologist
- Theodor Martens (1822–1884), architectural and landscape painter
- Friedrich Bernhard Christian Maassen (1823–1900), law professor
- Gottlob Frege (1848–1925), mathematician, logician and philosopher
- Hermann Ritter (1849–1926), viola player, composer and music historian
- Guglielmo Plüschow (1852–1930), a German photographer of male nudes in Italy
- Marie Musaeus Higgins (1855–1926), founder of Musaeus College, Colombo
- Franz Ziehl (1857–1926), bacteriologist
- Elisabeth Krämer-Bannow (1874–1945), ethnologist, explored the islands of the South Pacific.
- Gustav Neckel (1878–1940), Germanist and Scandinavist
- Anton von Hohberg und Buchwald (1885–1934), Reichswehr and SS officer
- Helmuth Wohlthat (1893–1982), civil servant and diplomat
- Harald Weinrich (born 1927), classical scholar; scholar of Romance philology and philosopher
- Uwe Holmer (1929–2023), pastor, author and theologian; housed Erich Honecker and his wife
- Gunter Pleuger (born 1941), diplomat and politician
- Klaus Grünberg (born 1941), actor
- Simone Oldenburg (born 1969), politician, local Deputy Minister-President since 2021
- Thomas Wiegand (born 1970), electrical engineer; substantially contributed to video coding formats
- René Domke (born 1972), German politician

=== Sport ===
- Heino Kleiminger (1939–2015), footballer
- Peter Sykora (born 1946), footballer, played over 270 pro games
- Joachim Streich (1951–2022), football player and coach, played 378 games and 98 for East Germany
- Marita Koch (born 1957), track and field athlete of the GDR and 1980 Summer Olympics champion
- Roswitha Eberl (born 1958), canoeist
- Kerstin Brandt (born 1961), high jumper
- Andreas Zachhuber (born 1962), football player and coach
- Kathrin Haacker (born 1967), 1988 Summer Olympics champion in rowing
- Fiete Sykora (born 1982), footballer, played over 430 pro games
- Robert Tesche (born 1987), footballer, played over 400 pro games

== In cinema ==
The 1922 vampire film Nosferatu, eine Symphonie des Grauens (Nosferatu: A Symphony of Horror) was set and partially shot in Wismar (renamed "Wisborg" in the film). A take from the Marienkirche's (Saint Mary's Church) tower over Wismar marketplace with the Wasserkunst Wismar (waterworks fountain) served as the establishing shot for the Wisborg scene. Other locations included the Wassertor (Water Gate), the southside of St. Nicholas, the Heilig-Geist-Kirche (Holy-Spirit-Church) and the harbour area.

In later decades, Wismar retained its association with Nosferatu. The setting of Wismar was reused in Werner Herzog's 1979 remake of the film, Nosferatu, Phantom der Nacht; unable to film in the town, however, Herzog relocated his production to the cities of Delft and Schiedam in the Netherlands. The 2000 metafiction horror film Shadow of the Vampire, which depicts the filming of the 1922 silent film, also takes place in Wismar.

== Twin towns – sister cities ==
Wismar is twinned with:

- Kemi, Finland (1959)
- Aalborg, Denmark (1963)
- Calais, France (1971)
- Lübeck, Germany (1987)
- Kalmar, Sweden (2002)
- Pogradec, Albania (2019)

In addition, since 1991 there is a friendship with Halden in Norway.

== See also ==
- State Museum of Technology outside of Wismar.
