= Poel =

Insel Poel
- Municipality
- Church in Kirchdorf

- Flag Coat of arms

- Location of Insel Poel within Nordwestmecklenburg district
- Interactive map of Insel Poel
- Location within Germany Location within Mecklenburg-Vorpommern
- Coordinates: 54°00′N 11°26′E
- Country: Germany
- State: Mecklenburg-Vorpommern
- District: Nordwestmecklenburg
- Subdivisions: 15 Ortsteile

Government
  - Mayor: Gabriele Richter

Area
  - Total: 36.02 km^{2} (13.91 sq mi)
- Elevation: 0–26 m (0–85 ft)

Population (2025-12-31)
  - Total: 2,486
  - Density: 69.02/km^{2} (178.8/sq mi)
- Time zone: UTC+01:00 (CET)
  - Summer (DST): UTC+02:00 (CEST)
- Postal codes: 23999
- Dialling codes: 038425
- Vehicle registration: NWM
- Website: www.insel-poel.de

Poel (German pronunciation: [pøːl]) or Poel Island (German: Insel Poel), is an island in the Baltic Sea. It forms the natural northern and eastern boundaries of the Bay of Wismar on the German coast. The northern coast of the island is also on the south side of the large gulf known as the Bay of Mecklenburg, which Wismar Bay enters into. Insel Poel thus forms on its northern side the unofficial latitude of the northern boundary of the Wismar Bay.

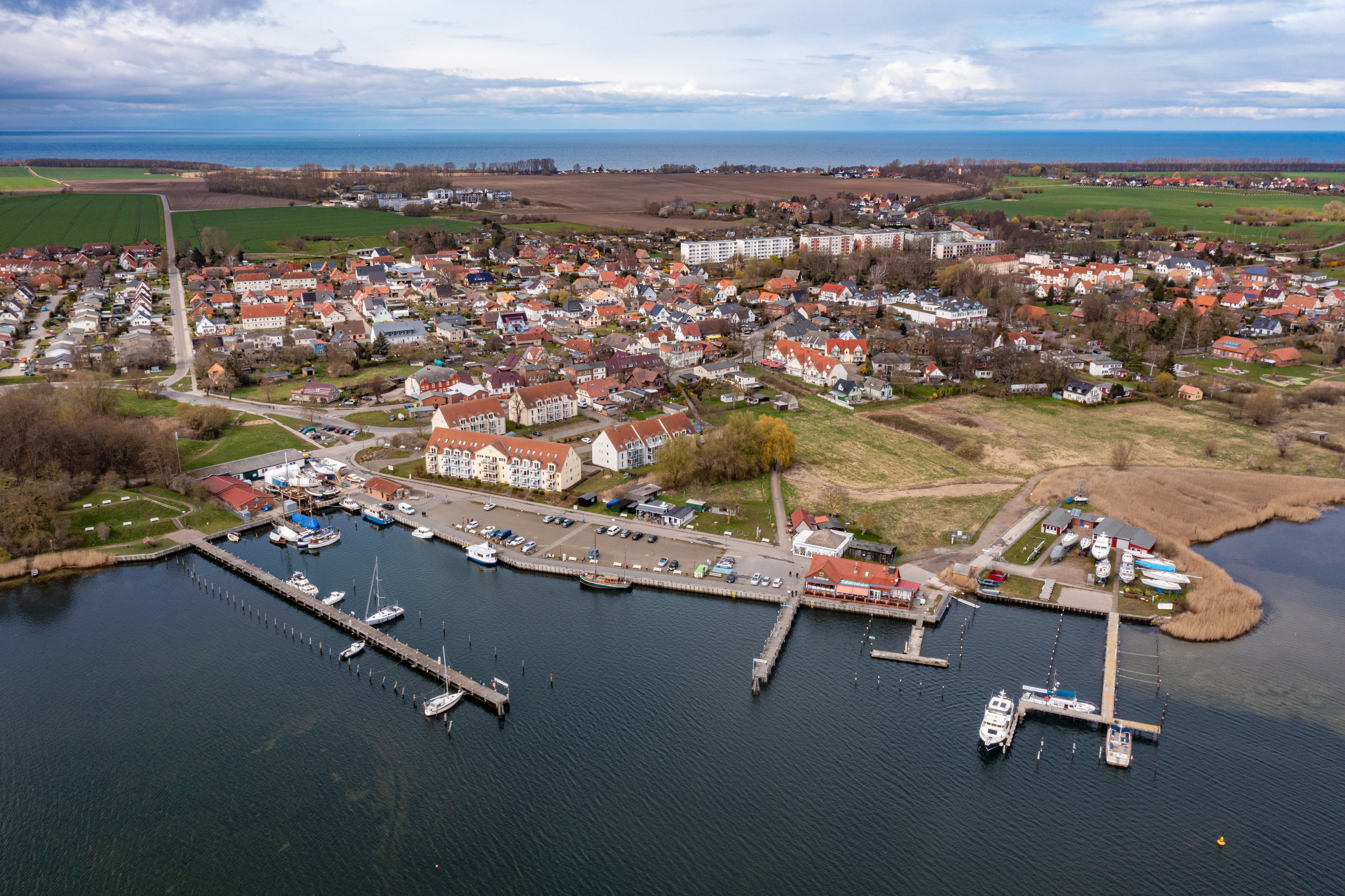
Harbour, Kirchdorf

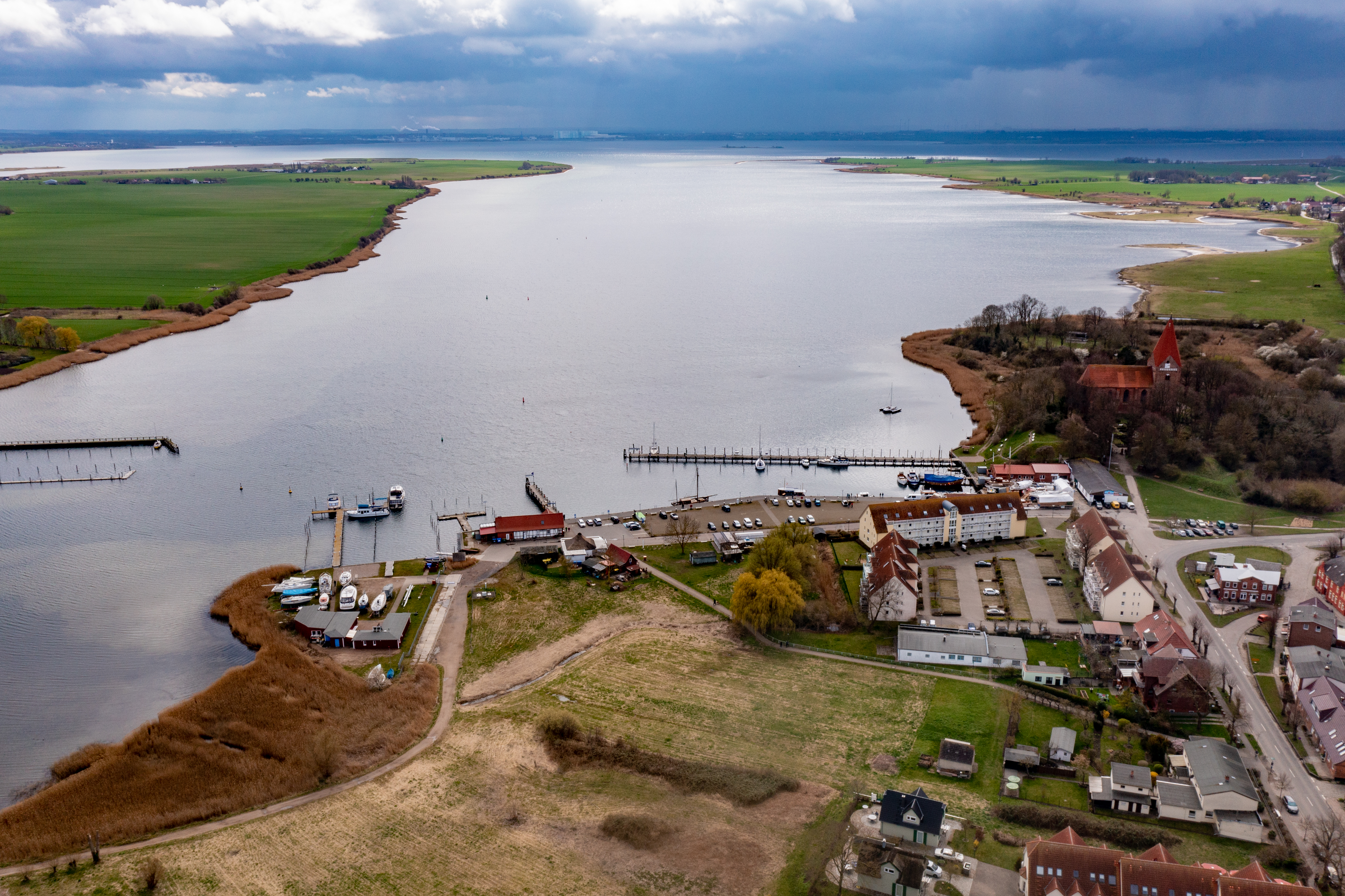
Wismar Bay, Kirchdorf

It is close to the cities of Lübeck, Wismar and Schwerin and is part of the Hamburg Metropolitan Region.

Administratively it is a municipality in the Nordwestmecklenburg district. It consists of Kirchdorf and Oertzenhof (the main towns) and the smaller villages of Timmendorf, Wangern, Hinterwangern, Weitendorf, Weitendorf-Hof, Brandenhusen, Neuhof, Seedorf, Niendorf, Schwarzer Busch, Kaltenhof, Fährdorf, Malchow, Vorwerk and Gollwitz. It covers an area of 36.02 km^{2} (13.91 sq mi) and has 2,873 citizens. Satellite pictures show that most of it is used as farmland. With its good air, clean water, fine beaches and sheltered harbours, it is also popular recreational area. At Timmendorf harbour there are a pilot's station and facilities for yachts and local fishermen. Kirchdorf has a yachting harbour and a boatyard. Wismar Bay is cited by the Encyclopædia Britannica Eleventh Edition (1910-1911) as the finest harbor on the Baltic.

The island's name derives from pole, the Common Slavic word for "flat land" or "field".

== History ==
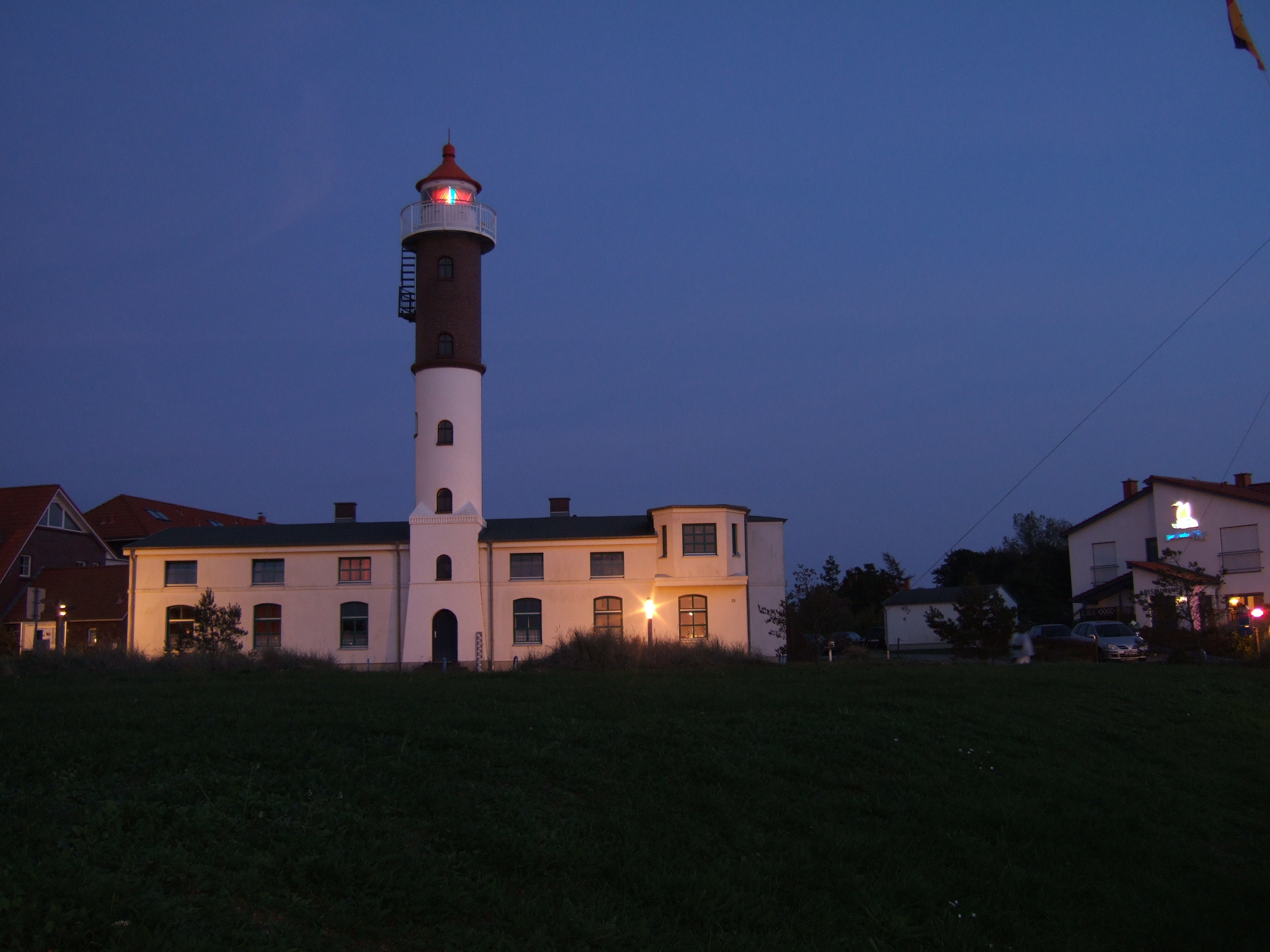
Timmendorf lighthouse, landmark of Poel Island

Poel's first inhabitants in historic times were Slavs, belonging to the West Mecklenburgian tribe of the Obotrites. The Slavic ruler and Lord of Mecklenburg Heinrich Borwin I brought German settlers from the providences of Dithmarschen and Holstein to the island in the early 13th century. They began building the church on Poel around 1210. The church was built in four or five periods and was completed around 1350. The tower (the oldest part of the building) is in Romanesque style, and with its 47 meters it is visible from almost all points on the island. The church nave was originally Romanesque in style, however it was enlarged around 1300 with a long and high choir and at that time changed into the Gothic style. The church which still remains a major sightseeing attraction on the island contains two winged Marian altars from the 15th century, a triumphal cross from around 1450, a rare Danish gravestone from the 13th century and the model of a Zeesenboat from 1936. Since about 1535 it is a Lutheran Church. Besides the weekly Divine Service there are also many concerts with classical music in the church during the summer months.

In 1614 Duke of Mecklenburg Adolf Friedrich I started the construction of a fortress on the island in the vicinity of the church, making use of the strategically good location. In 1618 it was completed. In June 1620 Gustav II Adolf of Sweden visited his cousin Duke Johann Albrecht II here, and in September of that same year his bride-to-be, Princess Maria Eleonora of Brandenburg, visited the island and stayed at the castle on the way to her marriage in Stockholm. She was received by Duke Johann Albrecht II with a festive worship service in the church and will a feast that went on for several days. During the Thirty Years' War the Duke had to give up the castle to enemy imperial troops (i.e., the Catholic coalition) in 1628. General Wallenstein ruled over Mecklenburg for several years.

In 1631 Gustav Adolf helped the dukes of Mecklenburg regain their power, and Johann Albrecht II returned to Poel finding the castle in a desolate condition. When Mecklenburg signed a truce with Emperor Ferdinand II (Holy Roman Empire) in 1635, the Swedes invaded the land and took over the castle on Poel. The emperor's troops returned in 1638, drove the Swedes away and burned several villages.

Map of Swedish controlled Wismar, Neukloster and Poel, along with the parts of the island owned by the Heiligen-Geist-Hospital of Lübeck.

After the Treaty of Westphalia in 1648 two-thirds of Poel together with Wismar and the municipality of Neukloster were granted to the King of Sweden. The western third of the island remained the property of the Holy-Spirit-Hospital (Heiligen-Geist-Hospital) in Lübeck which had already had this endowment for several centuries. The Swedes were in possession of the castle on Poel but had no interest in it, since they invested all their money and efforts in making Wismar a major military centre on the Baltic Sea. The castle quickly deteriorated and by 1740 there were only ruins left.

In the 19th century the inhabitants of Poel were allowed to use the bricks to build their homes and barns so that the buildings were completely disassembled. Today one still can see the impressive earthen embankments and most of the moats which were constructed between 1614 and 1618 for defense purposes. The castle grounds were formed in a five-pointed star form, and the church with its grounds (see above) were enclosed into a similar defense compound in the shape of the tail of a star (the so-called "Hornewerck"). In November 1802 the House of Mecklenburg under the leadership of Duke Friedrich Franz I came in possession of the property of the Holy-Spirit-Hospital in Lübeck. The Swedish portion of the island was leased for 99 years by the Duke in 1803. It officially remained in Swedish possession until 1903, when it completely returned to Mecklenburg.

Since the 17th century Poel has been connected to the mainland with dams and bridges. Since 1927 the island has been connected to the mainland by a causeway.

In 2003 a sister city treaty was signed with Hammarö Municipality, an island in lake Vänern in Sweden.

Nearby Walfisch island was also fortified.
