= Bay of Wismar =

Coordinates: 53°56′56″N 11°24′40″E

Map of the Bay of Wismar

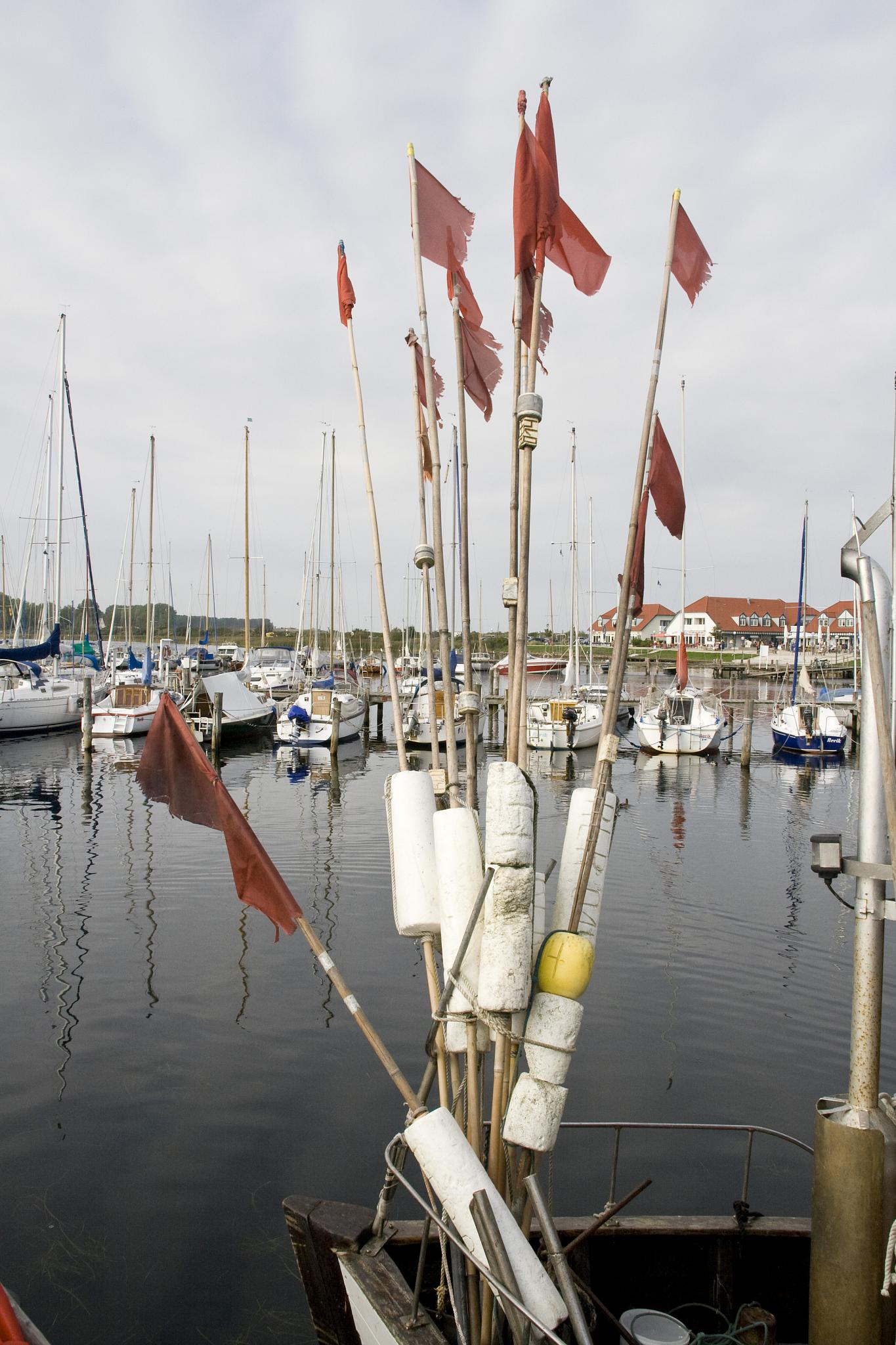
Fishing boats

The Bay of Wismar or more commonly Wismar Bay or Wismarbucht is a well sheltered multi-sectioned bay in the southwestern Baltic Sea, in Mecklenburg-Vorpommern, Germany, and is considered the south-central part of the much larger arm of the Baltic known as the Mecklenburg Bay (or Mecklenburg Bight, for its long narrow bent shape)—a long fingerlike gulf oriented to the west-southwest (WSW) from the (central) Baltic proper. Wismar bay is considered one of the finest natural harbors on the Baltic, and served as the destination for much seaborne shipping until circa the 1910s when its minimum depths of 5 meters (16 ft) became too shallow for larger more modern ships. Today, because of the shallow sheltered waters the bay is the subject of much research via underwater archeology.

There are four lobe like parts of the Bay of Wismar which are themselves bays on its southern shores, each separated by a north intruding headland from the others (see maps at right) and a broad channel running northwest to southeast parallel to the line formed by the tips of the four bounding headlands. The tips of the four headlands are remarkably well aligned and very closely co-linear spanning 10.80 mi (17.38 km) northwest to southeast tip to tip along the channel along which the inlets are respectively Boltenhagen Bay, Wohlenberger Wiek, Eggers Wiek, and the inner bay. A channel, the Breitling between Poel island and the mainland is accounted part of the bay as well, which in its northern limit is the north shore of the island.

From the western headland to the eastern shore of the inner bay is 13.4 miles (21.6 km). All of the waters are bounded by Poel Island on one side—a large mainly agricultural and recreational island sheltering the most easterly parts of bay (the inner Bay of Wismar and the small coastal seaport) along most of its northern edge.

The sheltered anchorage extends over a rhombus shaped area in the southerly lee of Poel island roughly 3 miles (4.8 km) N–S in the inner anchorage narrowing to 1.75 miles (2.82 km) N-S between the innermost headland and southernmost tip of the island and roughly 5–6 miles (8–10 km) that distance WNW to ESE.

In general, the main waters of the bay are located to the west, southwest and south relative to Poel Island which is wholly within Wismar Bay. The northern tip of the island in a line westerly to the headland of Großklützhöved (3.35 mi (5.39 km) north of the village of Klütz) forms the mouth of the bay.

Main ports: Wismar, 20 mi (32 km) by rail north of Schwerin.

== See also ==
- Lighthouses and lightvessels in Germany
