= Brave Little Hunter =

Individual Bigg's killer whale

Brave Little Hunter (Nuu-chah-nulth: kʷiisaḥiʔis, a name given to her by the Ehattesaht First Nation) is a Bigg's killer whale that gained notoriety after she became beached with her mother near Zeballos, British Columbia.

== Life ==
Brave Little Hunter became stranded with her mother, who was pregnant, in a tidal lagoon. Efforts were made to rescue both whales but the calf's mother did not survive. The calf remained trapped in the same lagoon for a month. The local tidal conditions meant that there were only 30 minutes each day in which the orca could leave. A nearby sandbar also made it difficult for the calf to travel into open ocean. While rescue efforts were unsuccessful, the orca eventually left the lagoon unaided by following a boat at night in April 2024. She was then observed hunting birds and seals on her own. While the calf had relatives in the area, she was not spotted with them. It was speculated that she may have been accepted by an unrelated pod as this has sometimes happened to other orphaned calves. As of September 2024, she had only ever been spotted by herself. There have been no additional sightings since then.

== Rescue efforts ==
The orca's plight received international attention. Veterinarians, drone specialists, heavy equipment operators and data imaging analysts were consulted while she was stranded. There were several unsuccessful attempts to free her. Some methods used included using recorded vocalizations from her relatives, loud noise from pipes, playing drums, and a violin solo. Harbour seal meat was provided to meet her nutritional needs while plans were being made to physically move her into a sling.

A GoFundMe fundraiser raised $44,000 but did not reach its $500,000 target. The Department of Fisheries and Oceans spent $260,000 of their allocated million dollar budget for the Marine Mammal Response Program due to the perceived importance of the rescue. The Ehattesaht First Nation also funded their own volunteer efforts. They have since sought $250,000 in compensation, but the federal government has disputed the accuracy of their claimed expenses.

== See also ==
- Springer (orca)
- List of individual cetaceans
