= Old Thom (orca) =

Killer whale known to frequent the Gulf of Maine

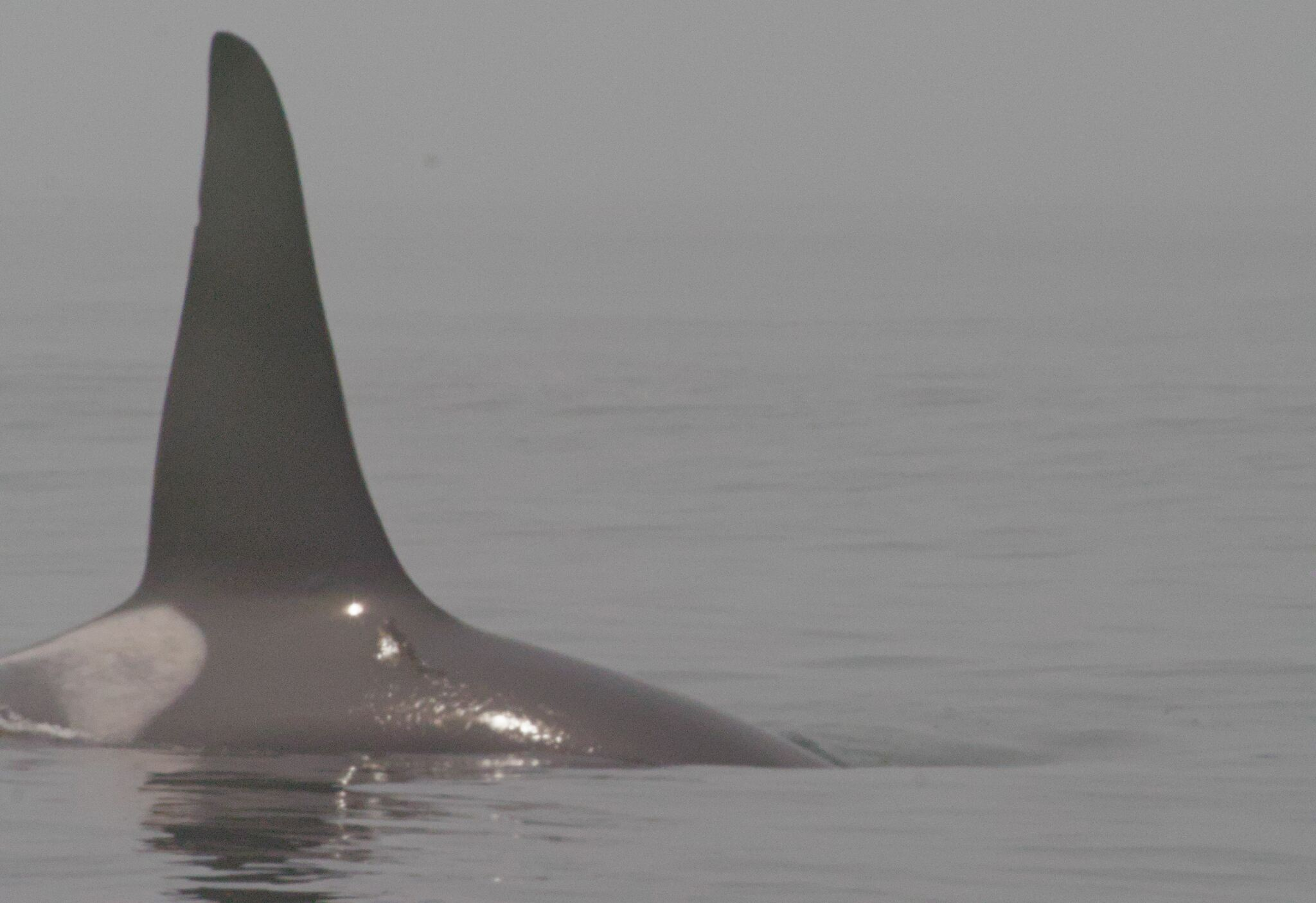
- Species: Orcinus orca
- Sex: Male
- Years active: 2006–present

Old Thom is a male North Atlantic killer whale (orca) known for being the only killer whale to regularly be sighted in the Gulf of Maine and the Bay of Fundy. Often referred to as a loner, the whale has never been seen with other orcas, but is often accompanied by Atlantic white-sided dolphins, who seem to feed alongside the orca. The orca has received considerable media attention for its visits to Cape Cod throughout the late 2010s and 2020s.

== Identifying features ==
Old Thom is a large bull orca, and is estimated to be 25 to 30 feet (7.6 to 9.1 m) long, with an estimated weight of 8 short tons (7.3 t). The dorsal fin is estimated to be about 6 feet (1.8 m) high. The whale is identified by a distinct notch a third of the way down the posterior side of the dorsal fin.

== Sighting history ==
The first known sighting of Old Thom was in 2006, spotted by Canadian whale watching boats in the Bay of Fundy. The whale has since been seen nearly annually in the Bay of Fundy. In August 2010, the whale was observed in the Roseway Basin by the New England Aquarium, which was conducting North Atlantic right whale surveys. In July 2016, Old Thom was photographed by charter boat captain Bruce Peters 13 miles off the coast of Chatham, Massachusetts. The orca was again seen off the coast of Cape Cod by fishermen in May 2022, June 2023, June 2024, and August 2025. Old Thom was spotted twice in the USA in 2026, he was seen in Stellwagen Bank in April and in June he was seen about 10 miles from Nantucket, but seen multiple times throughout the Bay of Fundy. At least twice off the coast of Grand Manan and other sightings off of Briar Island Nova Scotia.

== See also ==
- List of individual cetaceans
- North Atlantic and adjacent orca populations
