= Delta and Dawn =

Humpback whales

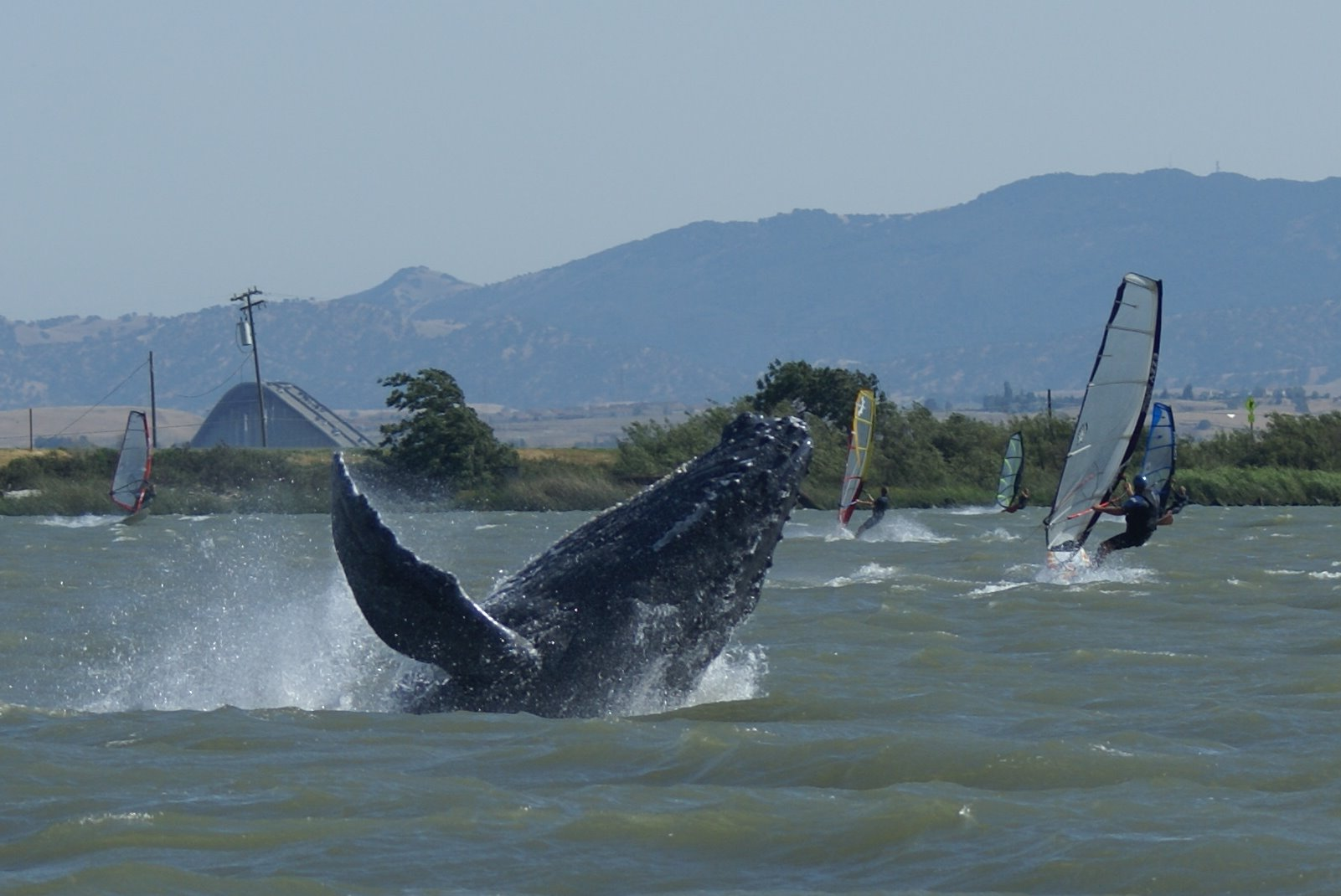
The calf "Dawn" in the Sacramento River in 2007 with the Antioch Bridge visible in the distance

Delta and Dawn, also known as the Delta whales, are two humpback whales, a mother and her calf, who entered San Francisco Bay in early May 2007. They swam up the Sacramento River approximately 90 nautical miles (170 km) upstream from the Golden Gate, about 20 miles (32 km) farther inland than Humphrey the Whale had gone two decades earlier. Under the Endangered Species Act, California state officials were required to rescue the animals. Their journey was thought to be the longest freshwater incursion by humpback whales ever documented.

== Efforts to save the whales ==
Staff from the Marine Mammal Center, researchers, Coast Guard personnel, and volunteers tried several methods to coax Delta and Dawn back downriver. The Marine Mammal Center was appointed by the California Office of Emergency Services as the lead rescue agency. Officials played recordings of the sounds of other humpback whales feeding and socializing to lure them, and banged on submerged metal pipes and sprayed high-powered blasts of water to repel them, but it is not clear whether any of these methods were particularly effective. There was heightened concern for the whales' well-being this time, because both of them had sizable gash wounds, most likely sustained from boat keel or propeller strikes. Veterinarians from the Marine Mammal Center and the Woods Hole Oceanographic Institution administered antibiotics to the whales to help heal these deep open wounds, and they took samples of skin lesions incurred during the whales' extended time away from seawater to analyze them for possible freshwater bacterial infection. This was the first time antibiotics had been administered to free-swimming whales in the wild.

== Return to the sea ==
On May 20, after languishing for six days in the Sacramento Deep Water Ship Channel, the whales finally started moving. They were spotted the next day about 20 miles (32 km) downstream, just upriver from Rio Vista, where they lingered for several days, seemingly hesitant to pass under the Rio Vista Bridge. On May 27 they were on the move again and were spotted the next day another 20 miles (32 km) downstream in the saltier waters of Suisun Bay, just 40 miles (64 km) or so from the ocean, but again their circling movements seemed to indicate a reluctance to pass beneath a bridge, actually a trio of bridges this time at Benicia. On May 29, however, they again moved quickly, passing under the Benicia Bridge in the morning and swimming through the Carquinez Strait and past yet another pair of bridges. By late afternoon they had continued through San Pablo Bay and were circling just beyond the Richmond-San Rafael Bridge near Tiburon. They were last spotted at sunset that night, within 10 miles (16 km) of the Golden Gate Bridge and the open ocean beyond.

== Naming convention ==
A small controversy arose over what to call the whales as soon as they were spotted far enough upriver to warrant significant attention. Besides being called "the Wayward Whales," they were also dubbed "Momma" and "Baby", "Rio" and "Vista", and "Delta" and "Dawn" (for the Sacramento-San Joaquin River Delta and the 1970s song "Delta Dawn"). California's Lieutenant Governor, John Garamendi, was the one to bestow the last pair of names upon the whales. Their names were inspired by local media contests throughout the region.

== Legacy ==
The story of the wayward whales inspired Stefanie Cruz, a news anchor for Sacramento-based television station KOVR, to write a children's book based on the tale, Delta & Dawn: Mother and Baby Whales' Journey, which was released in November 2007. The whales were also parodied by a cartoon.

== See also ==
- List of individual cetaceans
- Humphrey the Whale
