= Iceberg (orca) =

Orca, one of the first all-white male orca discovered in the wild

- Species: Orcinus orca
- Sex: Male
- Years active: 2010 - present
- Known for: All-white adult male orca
- Residence: North Pacific

Iceberg (designated CO539) is the name of an all-white, mature male orca (killer whale) that was filmed and photographed in 2010 off the north-east coast of Russia. He is one of the first adult all-white orca bulls discovered in the wild.

Researchers attached to the Far East Russia Orca Project (FEROP), co-founded and co-directed by Alexander M. Burdin and Erich Hoyt, first spotted the orca when his six-foot (two-metre) dorsal fin broke the surface near the Commander Islands in the Bering Sea in August 2010. He was living in a pod with 12 other orcas, and given the size of his dorsal fin was thought to be at least 16 years old. Scientists from FEROP speculated that he may have been the albino whale spotted off the coast of Alaska in 2000 and 2008. He was still alive as of 2016, when he was again spotted by FEROP with his pod.

It is unconfirmed whether Iceberg's pigmentation is albinism or leucism. FEROP is hoping in future expeditions to find out. The white coloration, more common in the Russian north Pacific than among Antarctic whales, may be a sign of dangerous inbreeding.

== See also ==
- Chimo, an albino orca who had Chediak-Higashi syndrome
- List of individual cetaceans
