= Ethelbert (orca) =

Individual killer whale in 1931 in Oregon, US

Ethelbert was a juvenile orca that surfaced in the Columbia River near Portland, Oregon, United States, in October 1931. The orca swam 100 miles (160 km) from the sea up the river. Being a rare sighting that far up the river, many sportsmen grabbed rifles and guns and began to shoot the whale to try and kill it for themselves. Julius L. Meier, the Governor of Oregon, ordered them to stop. Some thought the whale was healthy but others thought it was slowly dying and needed to be humanely put down. Ed Lessard, a former whaler, and his son Joseph Lessard set out with harpoons and killed the whale, who had gained the name Ethelbert.

The body of the whale was retrieved by others and pickled in embalming fluid for preservation. Ethelbert was seized by the State of Oregon and later, through many legal battles going all the way to the Supreme Court, Lessard procured the whale. Some years after, Lessard carted Ethelbert around the country as a showpiece.

Due to a result of neighbors complaining about a strange smell Ethelbert's body was discovered on Lessard's property in St. Helens in August 1949, with the tank now rusted and the protective fluid leaking as a result.

Reports claim that the whale was taken and re-buried in the community of Ireland, outside of the city Washougal, Washington, though the exact whereabouts of Ethelbert's body and whether they remain there today are unknown. The whale’s bones can still be seen but removal is prohibited under the federal Marine Mammal Protection Act.

== See also ==
- List of individual cetaceans
