= Porphyrios (whale) =

Whale active near Constantinople

Porphyrios (Greek: Πορφύριος) was a large whale (κῆτος) that harassed and sank ships in the waters near Constantinople in the sixth century. Active for over fifty years, Porphyrios caused great concern for Byzantine seafarers. Emperor Justinian I (r. 527–565) made it an important matter to capture it, though he could not come up with a way to do so. Porphyrios eventually met its end when it beached itself at the mouth of the Sakarya River on the Black Sea and was attacked and cut into pieces by a mob of locals.

== Name ==
The whale was given the name Porphyrios by Byzantine sailors; the name is sometimes alternatively rendered as Porphyrius, Porphyrion, Porphyry or Porphyrio and its origin is unclear. Common hypotheses on the name include it being derived from the contemporary charioteer Porphyrius or from the mythological giant Porphyrion, who waged war against the gods of Greek mythology. Anthony Kaldellis suggested in 2010 that the name of the whale alluded to the imperial purple and was "a sign of the respect in which the whale was held". This idea was also supported by Sian Lewis and Lloyd Llewellyn-Jones in 2018, who believed the name alluded to the color of royalty and was a sign of great awe for the whale.

In 1996, James Allan Stewart Evans suggested that the name was a reference to the color of the whale's skin. Porphyra meant a deep purple color in Greek and Porphyrios might have had dark-wine colored skin. This was further supported by John K. Papadopoulos and Deborah Ruscillo in 2002, who believed the name simply meant "purple". Daniel Ogden in 2008 also supported the idea that Porphyrios evoked the color of the whale, believing that the name was best interpreted as "purple boy". Kaldellis also supported this etymology in 2017.

== Life ==
Porphyrios is mentioned in the writings of the 6th-century Byzantine historian Procopius, both in the History of the Wars (VII 29) and The Secret History. According to Procopius, Porphyrios measured 13.7 meters (45 ft) long and 4.6 meters (15 ft) wide. Whales were not well understood in antiquity or in the Middle Ages and were often seen simply as great monsters (the original meaning of κῆτος being sea monster, and later describing Cetacea).

It is not possible to confidently identify to which species Porphyrios belonged. It might have been a sperm whale or an unusually large orca. Identification as a sperm whale is supported by its size, long lifespan, and temperament. On the other hand, identification as an orca is supported by its geographical location, since true whales rarely venture into the waters which Porphyrios was known to have frequented. If the name is a reference to the skin color, it could support either identification since both the black of orcas and the dark brownish gray of sperm whales could be interpreted as dark purple.

The most accepted theory of how Porphyrios ended up in the waters of Constantinople holds that when it was young, it swam through the Dardanelles while hunting and the strong currents of the strait prevented it from returning to the Aegean Sea. It also could not enter the Black Sea, a sea that whales avoid due to the low levels of oxygen in its waters. Consequently, Porphyrios was trapped in the Sea of Marmara. It is probable that it was the only whale in these waters, and as a result had an abundance of prey on which to feed. If it was an orca, this abundance could explain its unusually large size.

Porphyrios harassed ships in the waters of Constantinople for over fifty years, though not continuously since it at times disappeared for lengthy periods. It most frequently appeared in the Bosporus Strait. Porphyrios made no distinctions in regard to which ships it attacked, and was recorded as having attacked fishing vessels, merchant ships and warships. Many ships were sunk by Porphyrios, and its mere reputation terrified the crews of many more; ships often took detours to go around the waters where the whale most commonly swam. Emperor Justinian I (r. 527–565), perplexed by the whale attacks and wishing to keep sea routes safe, made it a matter of great concern to capture Porphyrios, though he was unable to devise a means to do it.

When chasing dolphins one day, Porphyrios ran aground near the mouth of the Sakarya River and was beached. Though Porphyrios struggled and attempted to get out of the mud, it only managed to sink deeper into the mud, and become more stuck. Locals in the vicinity quickly organized themselves into a mob to kill the famous sea monster, rushing out with axes and ropes. They first attempted to kill Porphyrios using their axes, but their cuts into its flesh had little effect. Using ropes and wagons, Porphyrios was then hauled farther up the beach and the whale was attacked and cut into pieces. Some of the attackers stored away their portion of the meat whereas others began to consume it on the spot.

== Legacy ==
According to Procopius, the death of Porphyrios was a great relief to the general population, though some speculated that the killed whale might have been a different whale. Porphyrios is the earliest documented case of a rogue whale attacking seafarers.

Porphyrios was mentioned in Edward Gibbon's The History of the Decline and Fall of the Roman Empire (1776–1789); Gibbon believed Porphyrios to have been a "stranger and wanderer" since there are no species comparable to it in size and behavior in the Mediterranean. In his commentary on Gibbon's Decline and Fall, George Horne (1730–1792) interprets Gibbon's passage on the whale as subtly implying that it was a fictional beast. Angered by this, Horne wrote on Porphyrios that "either God had prepared a whale specially for this purpose, or it was not a whale at all". The tale of Porphyrios is mentioned in Herman Melville's Moby-Dick (1851) as a historical case of a whale attacking humans.

Porphyrios appears in Robert Graves's historical fiction novel Count Belisarius (1938). In Count Belisarius, Justinian, after receiving complaints from friends and acquaintances of his wife Empress Theodora, dispatches the famed general Belisarius to hunt for the whale. Belisarius takes a warship equipped with a catapult to search for Porphyrios and the whale is discovered while heading towards Constantinople. The crew begin throwing harpoons and shooting arrows, though this has little effect as Porphyrios dives beneath the waves and swims away. The battle between Belisarius and Porphyrios has sometimes erroneously been mentioned as a real event by some later authors.

== See also ==
- List of individual cetaceans
