= Samoa (orca) =

Female orca formerly in captivity at SeaWorld San Antonio, Texas

- Species: Killer whale (Orcinus orca)
- Breed: Icelandic
- Sex: Female
- Born: c. 1980
- Died: March 14, 1992; SeaWorld San Antonio
- Years active: 1983-1992
- Offspring: 1
- Weight: 6,150 lb (2,790 kg)

Samoa was a female killer whale captured in November 1983 in Iceland. She was captured off the east coast near Berufjordur and was sent to Saedyrasafnid aquarium before she was sold to Acuarama, a Brazilian aquarium along with a male named Nandu.

After Nandu's death, Samoa was Acuarama's only killer whale and was sold to SeaWorld. She was transferred to SeaWorld Ohio in May 1989, and was moved to SeaWorld Texas in October 1990.

During her stay at Texas she mated with an Icelandic killer whale named Kotar. Samoa died due to complications of giving birth. On March 14, 1992, Samoa went into premature labour, and died giving birth to a female calf a few hours later. The calf was stillborn. While Seaworld staff never reported unusual behavior, guests had made reports that prior to her death, Samoa had been coming out of the water and landing on the concrete slide-out area. It was the first reported death of a SeaWorld orca while giving birth.

The age of Samoa at the time of her death ranged from 12 to 14 as indicated in various sources.

== See also ==
- List of individual cetaceans
