= Little Irvy =

Dead sperm whale used as traveling attraction

Little Irvy was a traveling sideshow attraction in the United States from late 1967 until the mid-1990s. The body of the 20-ton sperm whale was hauled around the country by trucker Jerry "Tyrone" Malone in Old Blue, a refrigerated tractor-trailer.

The whale was purchased in 1967 for $6,000 from the Del-Monte Fishing Company, which had captured the whale off the coast of Santa Barbara, California, with plans to sell the carcass for dog food. After the whale was harpooned, it was frozen by pumping 40 tons of liquid nitrogen pumped throughout the carcass. It was then kept in a glass tank in the refrigerated truck, with a sign reading "This Exhibit Is Dedicated to the Preservation of Whales". Despite the name, Irvy was a female whale specimen.

On July 9, 1967, the frozen whale made its debut at San Francisco's Fisherman's Wharf, and traveled the state fair and roadside attraction circuit for over 25 years.

After Malone's death in 1997, Little Irvy was buried in Tulare, California.

== See also ==
- List of individual cetaceans

== Notes and references ==
Works cited

- Webb, Dewey (20 April 1995), "Thar She Froze! Refrigerated Whale to Chill Out in the Arizona Desert after 30 Years on Show-Biz Road", Phoenix New Times, Phoenix, Arizona
