= List of individual cetaceans =

Real or fictional whales and dolphins

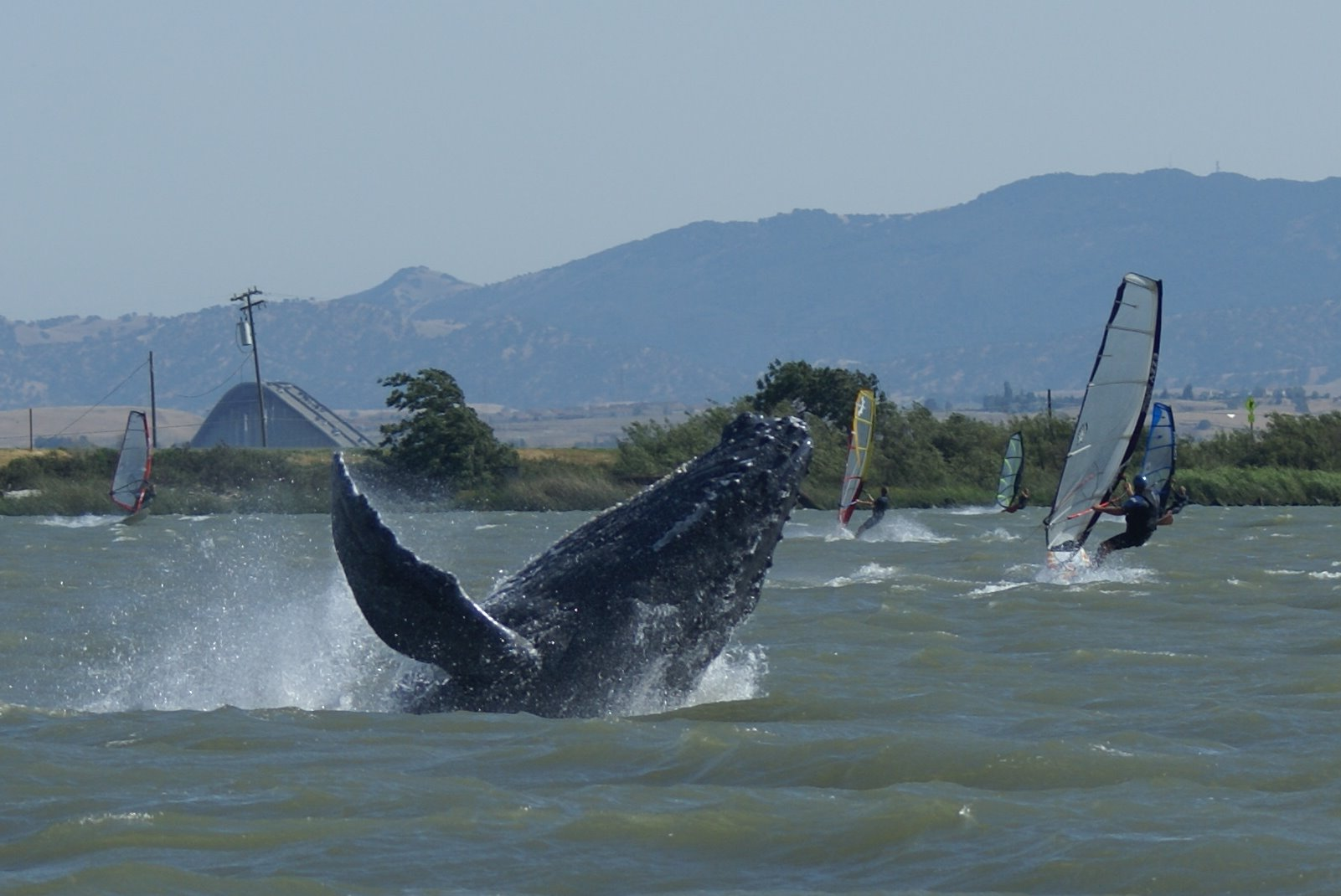
Dawn the humpback whale in the Sacramento River in 2007

Cetaceans are the animals commonly known as whales, dolphins, and porpoises. This list includes individuals from real life or fiction, where fictional individuals are indicated by their source. It is arranged roughly taxonomically.

== Baleen whales ==
=== Rorquals ===
- The 52-hertz whale (may be a blue whale hybrid)

==== Blue whales ====
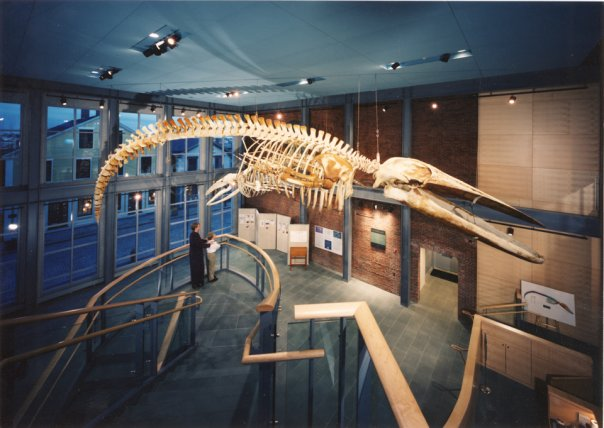
KOBO

- Bubbles, known for its "unique way of blowing bubbles before it dives"
- Hope
- KOBO, accidentally struck and killed by a tanker

==== Fin whales ====
- Moby Joe, a fin whale who became trapped in Newfoundland, the subject of Farley Mowat's 1972 book A Whale for the Killing

==== Humpback whales ====
- Delta and Dawn
- George and Gracie from Star Trek IV: The Voyage Home
- Humphrey the Whale
- Migaloo
- Mister Splashy Pants
- Sasha, also known as the Alaska whale
- The Tay Whale
- Timmy
- The whale that swam up the Saint Lawrence River to Montreal in 2020

=== Gray whales ===
- Bonnet, Crossbeak, and Bone or Putu, Siku, and Kanik (in Inupiaq); called Fred, Wilma, and Bamm-Bamm in the book Big Miracle and film adaptation
- Klamath River Whales

== Toothed whales ==
=== Beaked whales ===
==== Northern bottlenose whales ====
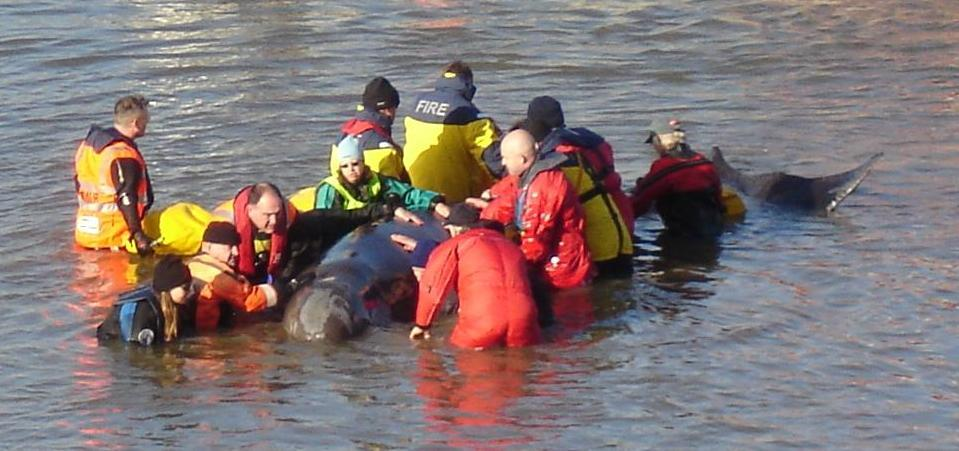
The River Thames whale being calmed by rescuers
- River Thames whale

=== Dolphins ===
- Delphinus from Greek mythology
- Ivan and Bessie from the 1967 novel The Day of the Dolphin or Alpha and Beta in the 1973 film adaptation
- Jones from the William Gibson short story Johnny Mnemonic
- Slim and Delbert from the TV series Dolphin Cove
- Snorky from the Night of the Dolphin segment of The Simpsons 2000 episode "Treehouse of Horror XI"
- Zoom from the anime series Zoom the White Dolphin
- The dolphin from the fairy tale The Dolphin

==== Bottlenose dolphins ====
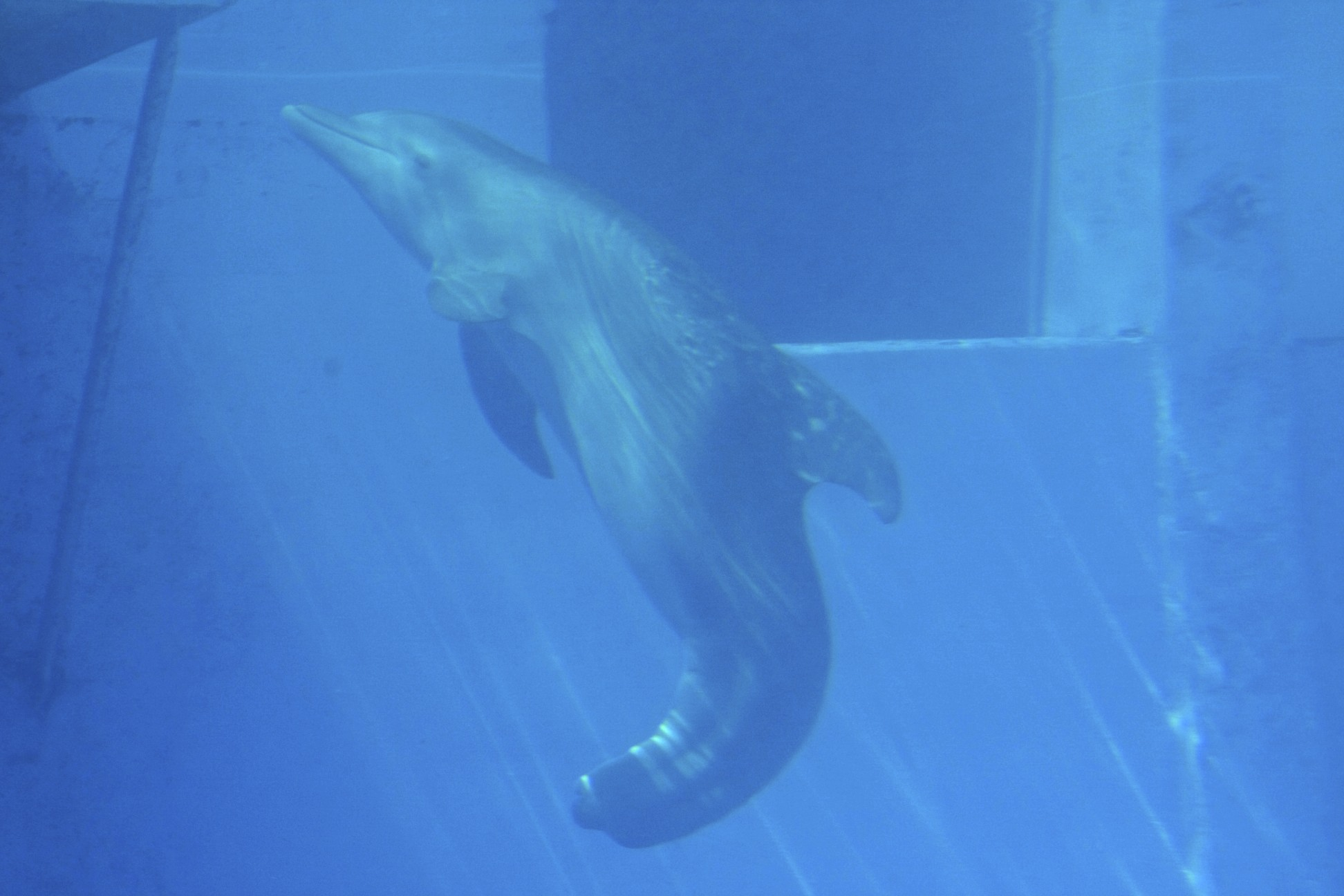
Winter swimming without her prosthetic tail

- Akeakamai, featured in the novel Startide Rising
- Davina
- Ecco from the video game series Ecco the Dolphin
- Fungie
- Flipper from the 1963 film of the same name and later film and television series in the same franchise
- Hiapo
- Hope, featured in the film Dolphin Tale 2
- Mitzie, who portrayed Flipper
- Moko
- Opo
- Peter, used in experiments in human-dolphin communication by John C. Lilly and Margaret Howe Lovatt
- Pinky
- Ronnie from the television series H_{2}O: Just Add Water
- Tião
- Winter, featured in the film Dolphin Tale

==== Orcas ====
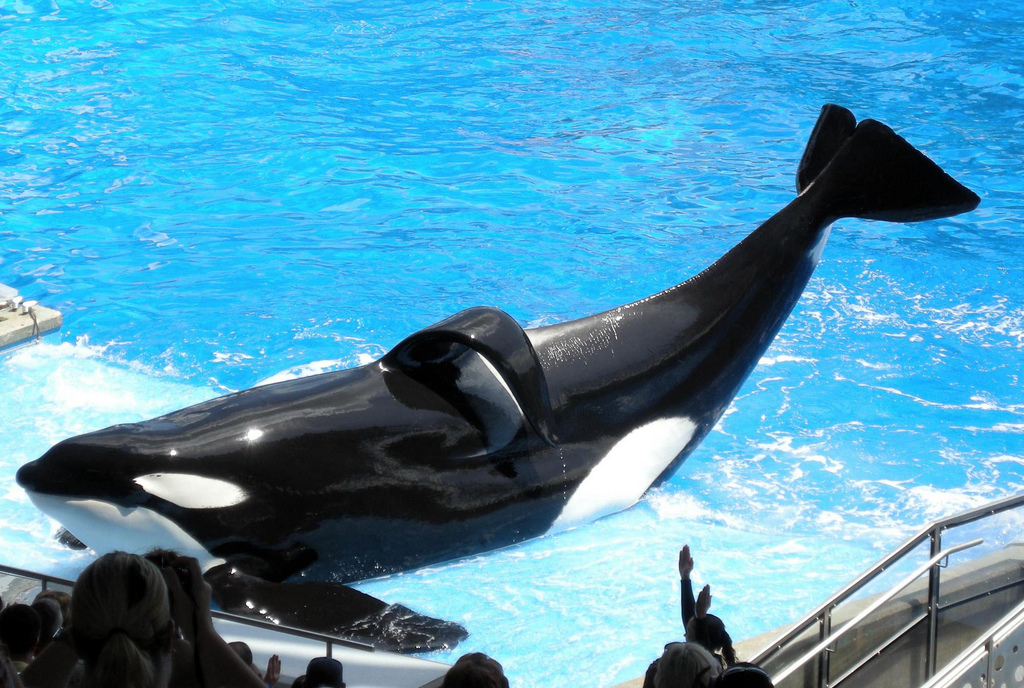
Tilikum at SeaWorld Orlando

- Brave Little Hunter (a.k.a. kʷiisaḥiʔis in Nuu-chah-nulth)
- Camus from the episode "Moby Dopes" of the TV series The Angry Beavers
- Chimo
- Corky (II)
- Ethelbert
- Granny
- Hoi Wai, who portrayed Neptune in the film Moon Warriors
- Iceberg
- Jambu or Willzyx from the episode "Free Willzyx" of the TV series South Park
- Kalina
- Kanduke
- Kasatka
- Katina
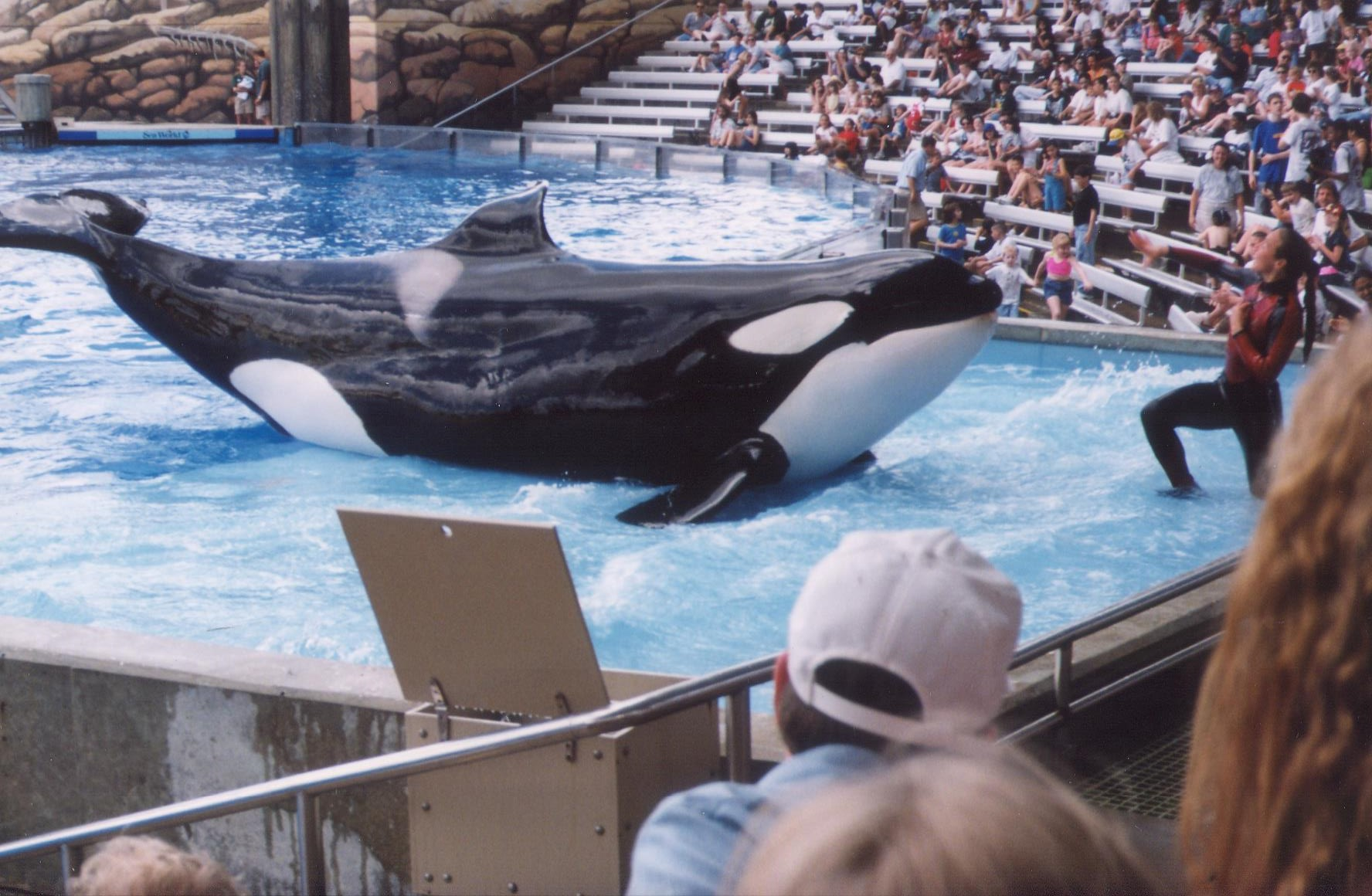
  Katina with trainer Dawn Brancheau
- Keet
- Keto
- Keiko, who portrayed Willy in the film Free Willy
- Klee Wyck, the anthropomorphic mascot of the 1994 Commonwealth Games
- Kiska, orca housed at Marineland and last captive orca kept in Canada
- Kohana
- Kotar
- Lolita
- Luna
- Malia
- Moby Doll
- Morgan
  Morgan in August 2010
- Namu, featured in the film Namu, the Killer Whale
- Neptune from the film Moon Warriors
- Ocean Sun (L25)
- Old Thom
- Old Tom
- Port and Starboard
- Ramu III
- Samoa
- Scarlet
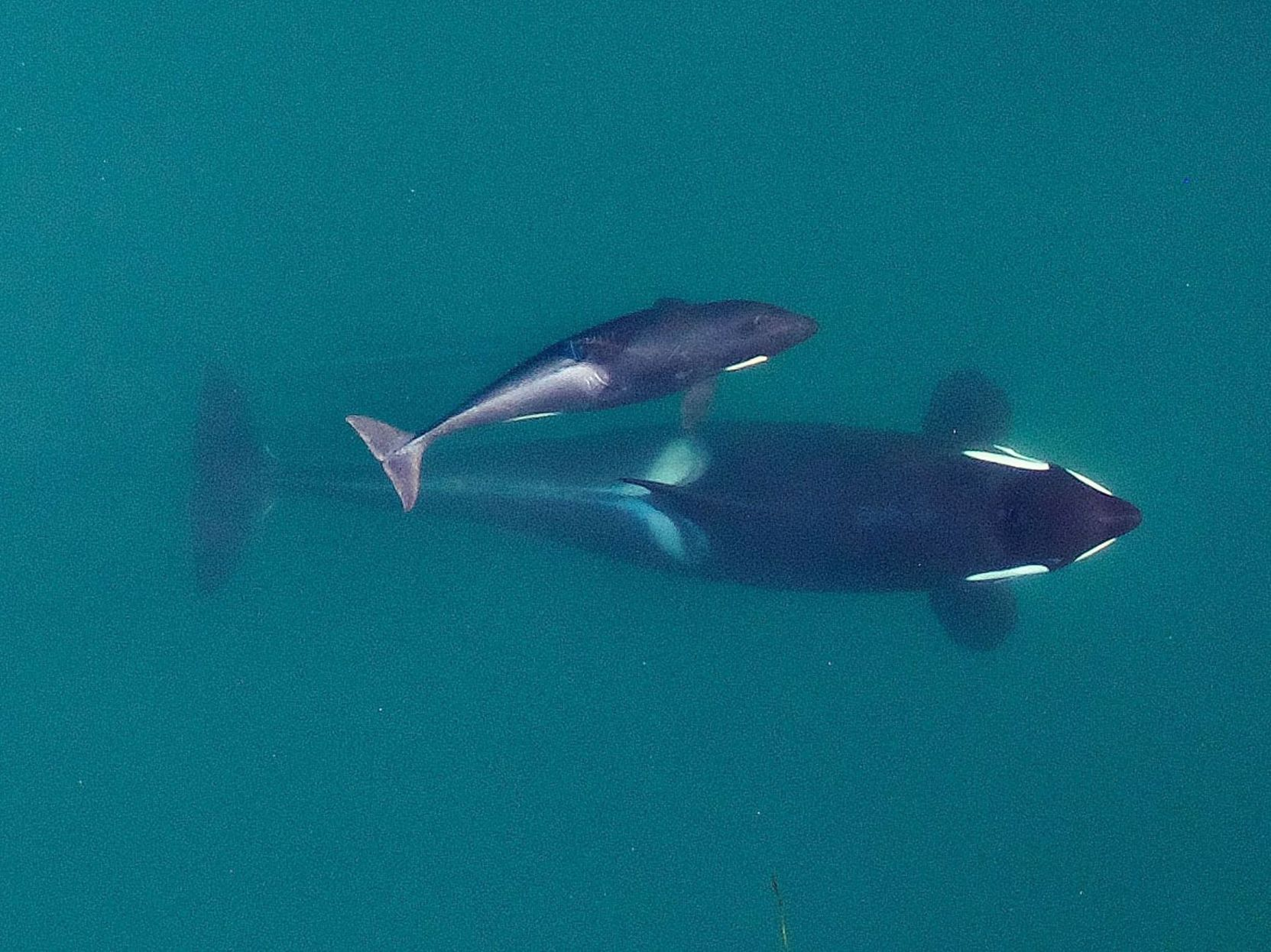
  Scarlet and her mother, J-16
- Shamu
- Springer
- Tahlequah
- Takara
- Tico from the anime series Tico of the Seven Seas
- Tilikum, known for his involvement in the deaths of three people; heavily featured in the documentary Blackfish
- Ulises
- Unna
- Walter the Whale, renamed Skana
- Wikie
- Willy from the film Free Willy and television adaptation
- The orca from the 1977 film Orca

==== Risso's dolphins ====
- Casper, an albino or leucistic Risso's dolphin inhabiting Monterey Bay, California
- Pelorus Jack

=== Sperm whales ===
- Little Irvy
- Moby Dick from the 1851 novel Moby-Dick
- Mocha Dick
- Monstro from Pinocchio
- New Zealand Tom, hunted in 1804 off the coast of New Zealand, and subsequently mentioned in Melville's discussion of sperm whales in Moby-Dick (Chapter 45: "The Affidavit")
- Pearl Krabs from SpongeBob SquarePants
- Timor Tom from Moby-Dick, chapter 45
- The exploding whale of Florence, Oregon
- The sperm whale from the book The Hitchhiker's Guide to the Galaxy and later adaptations

=== Belugas ===
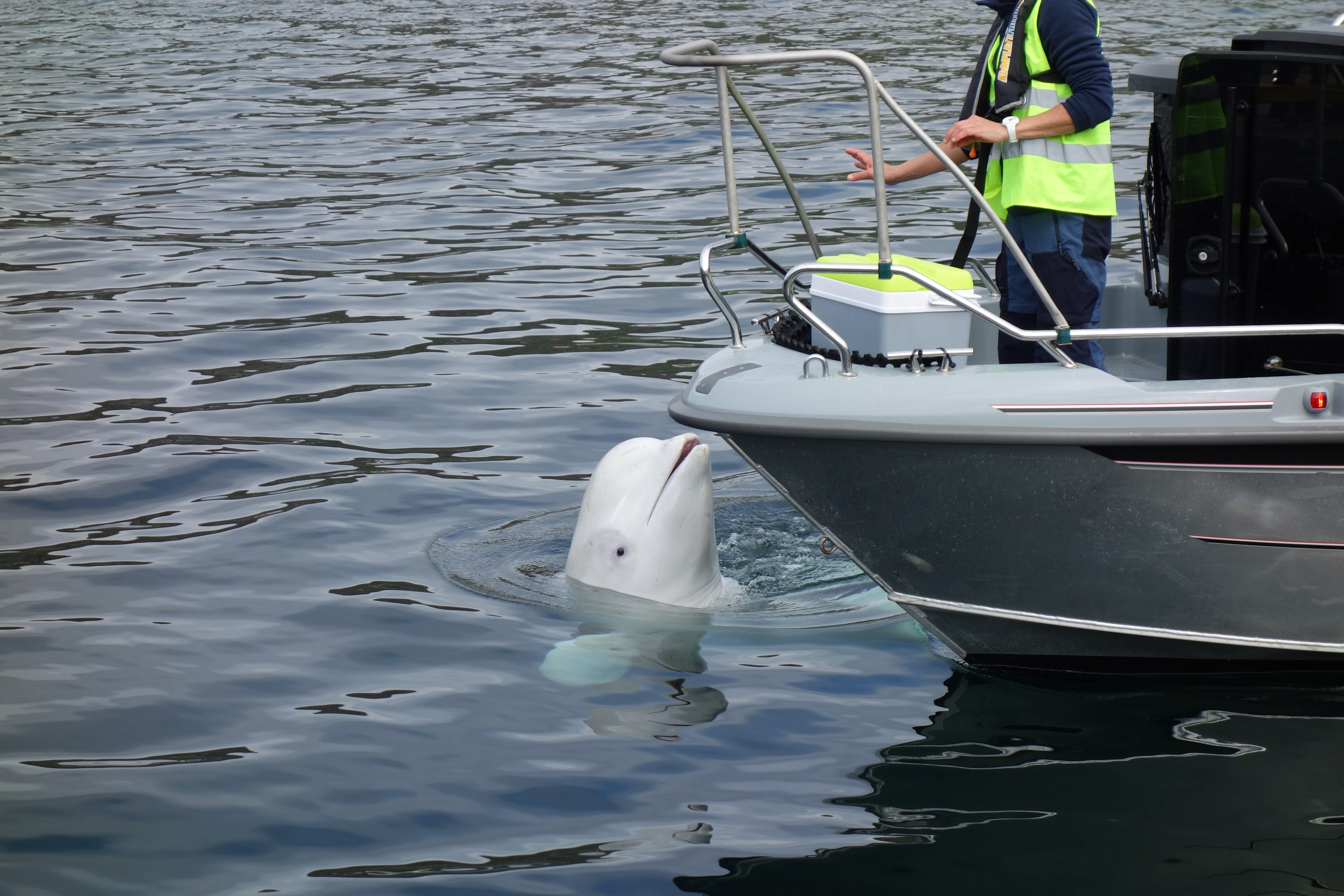
Hvaldimir

- Aydın (also known as Tichka), who became famous in Gerze, Turkey, in 1992 after apparently escaping a Soviet military marine-mammal program
- Baby Beluga from the music album of the same name
- Bailey from the 2016 Pixar film Finding Dory
- Benny
- Hvaldimir
- Juno
- Kayavak
- Moby Dick (Rhine)
- NOC

== Legendary ==
Because these individuals are legendary or mythic, their classification is unclear. As well, for some it is unclear whether they are even whales since whales were historically considered fish in Western culture.

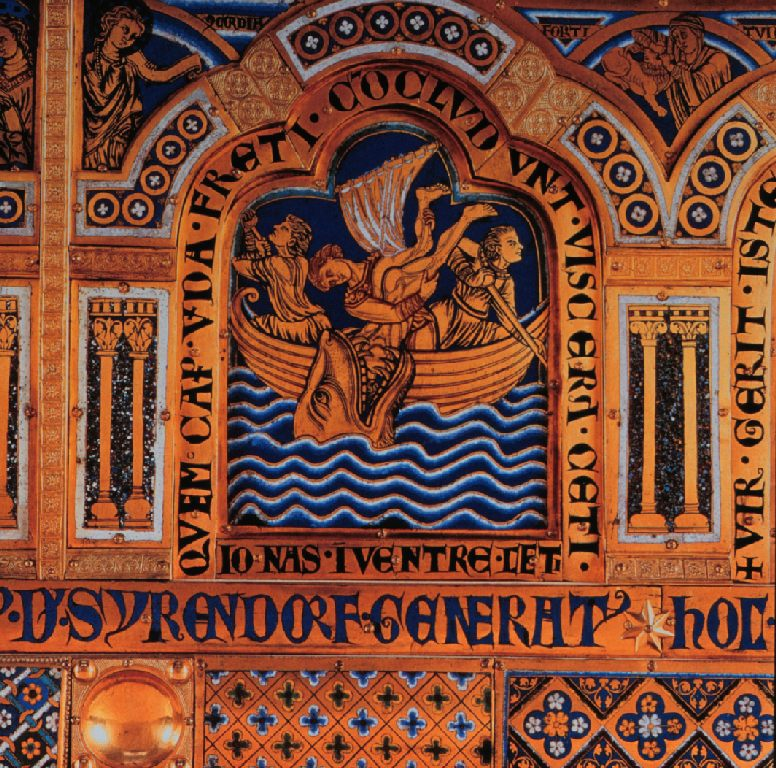
Jonah in the jaws of the whale
- Cetus from Greek mythology
- Devil Whale from legends such as the First Voyage of Sinbad the Sailor
- Leviathan from Abrahamic mythology
- Makara from Hindu mythology (possibly a South Asian river dolphin)
- Porphyrios, a large whale, possibly a sperm whale or an orca, that harassed and sank ships in the waters near Constantinople in the sixth century
- Rongomai from Māori mythology
- Tannin from Canaanite, Phoenician, and Hebrew mythology
- The whale who saved Kahutia-te-rangi in Māori mythology (usually considered to be a humpback whale – paikea – a name Kahutia-te-rangi would adopt himself)
- The whale from the Book of Jonah

== See also ==
- Dolphin § In history and religion
- Killer whales in popular culture
- List of captive killer whales
- List of cetaceans
- Military marine mammal
- Whale § In myth, literature and art
