= Orcas in popular culture =

Two orcas breaching

Orcas, also known as killer whales, have appeared in several movies and many documentaries.

Creatures by the name of "orca" or "orc" have appeared throughout the history of Western literature, most often as predators portrayed as being threatening to humans. The first written description of a killer whale was given by Pliny the Elder circa AD 70, who wrote, "Orcas (the appearance of which no image can express, other than an enormous mass of savage flesh with teeth) are the enemy of [other whales]... they charge and pierce them like warships ramming." In Ludovico Ariosto's epic poem Orlando Furioso, the orca (sometimes translated orc) was a sea-monster from whom the damsel Angelica was rescued by Orlando. This killer whale-like sea monster also appears in Michael Drayton's epic poem Polyolbion and in John Milton's Paradise Lost. The animal was known to Herman Melville, who nonetheless already had his antagonist in the sperm whale in his work Moby-Dick. In the 1970s, the killer whale came to be seen more broadly as a monster. As late as the 1970s, killer whales were at times depicted negatively in fiction as ravenous predators whose behavior caused heroes to interfere to help a prey animal escape. The poorly received film Orca features the story of a male killer whale going on what appears to be a vengeful rampage after his pregnant mate is killed by humans; yet at the same time, the film shows the killer whale having the intelligence needed both for vengeance and at the film's end, seemingly for forgiveness. In contrast, the 1974 Walt Disney produced motion picture, The Island at the Top of the World portrayed killer whales as bloodthirsty hunters of the protagonists in one particularly brutal scene. In Jaws (1975), the name of the boat used to hunt the great white shark is the Orca, given the killer whale's status as a known predator of the shark. However, in the sequel Jaws 2, the shark's first victim is a killer whale, which was probably intended more as a Hollywood joke than an accurate portrayal of the eating habits of great white sharks.

In recent years, increased research and the animal's popularity in public venues has brought about a dramatic rehabilitation of the killer whale's image, much as the North American wolf's image has been changed. It is now widely seen as a respected predator posing little or no threat to humans. The Free Willy films (1993-1997, 2010) present killer whales as victims of captivity, oil spills and poaching, and were influential in changing public attitudes to captive marine mammals. Following the success of the first of these, Free Willy, the film's captive star Keiko was returned to the coast of his native Iceland.

English-speaking scientists most often use the term "killer whale", although the term "orca" is increasingly used. Killer whale advocates point out it has a long heritage. Indeed, the genus name Orcinus means "of the kingdom of the dead".

Killer whales are apex predators, meaning that they themselves have no natural predators. They are sometimes called the wolves of the sea, because they hunt in groups like wolf packs. Killer whales hunt varied prey including fish, cephalopods, mammals, sea birds and sea turtles. However, different populations or species tend to specialize and some can have a dramatic impact on certain prey species.

== Specific appearances ==
=== Documentaries ===
The Whale is a 2011 documentary film directed by Suzanne Chisholm and Michael Parfit. Narrated by Ryan Reynolds, it tells the story of Luna, a killer whale (orca) living in Nootka Sound, Canada, who was separated from his pod at a young age.

Blackfish is a 2013 American documentary film directed by Gabriela Cowperthwaite. It concerns Tilikum, an orca held by SeaWorld and the controversy over captive killer whales. The film premiered at the 2013 Sundance Film Festival on January 19, 2013, and was picked up by Magnolia Pictures and CNN Films for wider release. It was nominated for the BAFTA Award for Best Documentary.

Killer Whales: Wolves of the Sea - Journeys With Wildlife, BBC Documentary - Sir David Attenborough Published on July 20, 2015. The documentary states, "Throughout every ocean on earth. killer whales are the masters of the sea. Like wolves on land, these fearsome predators often hunt in packs."

=== Film and television ===
In Kamandi (vol. 1) #22-23, Kamandi is found by Ben Boxer and his two companions, and all of them learn of a fantastic society of dolphins in which humans are trained as "squires". They battle the Red Baron, who is working for an intelligent killer whale.

The Japanese anime series Damekko Doubutsu features a killer whale in a humorous and ironic context: unable to swim without a flotation device. The 2006 Australian animated children's film Happy Feet portrayed two male killer whales as both powerful and intelligent playful predators and also as victims of human-caused ecological disruptions in a heavily polluted hunting ground. One of the killer whales sports massive propeller scars on its back and shies away in fear from a large fishing vessel. The killer whale's behaviour was dramatically exaggerated, yet based on genuine behaviours such as spyhopping, iceberg tipping and kicking and tossing of prey.

The 1984 film Samson and Sally and the 1995 film The Pebble and the Penguin also feature killer whales as antagonists.

Disney's animated series The Little Mermaid features Spot, a playful killer whale that Ariel adopts and takes care of when he was a baby. Spot appears twice in the TV series, once in the pilot "A Whale of a Tale" and "Save the whale" in Season 2.

Moby Lick from the animated series Street Sharks is a human who was mutated into an anthropomorphic orca by the villain Dr. Paradigm and placed under his control. After escaping Paradigm's control, Moby becomes an ally to the eponymous Street Sharks.

In Eight Below a killer whale carcass which was found by Max and the other dogs was guarded by a leopard seal.

A popular Internet video shows a killer whale appearing to jump on a group of kayakers. The event shown is a fake used in an advertisement for a sports drink.

In the G.I. Joe episode "Iceberg Goes South", Cobra scientist Doctor Mindbender uses DNA to transform the character, Iceberg, into a killer whale, whom the Joes must then safely capture and restore to being human. At the end of the episode, Dr. Mindbender, having escaped the Joes, finds himself being chased by a real killer whale. The episode has been described as one of the most bizarre G.I. Joe episodes.

=== Other appearances ===
The official mascot of the 1994 Commonwealth Games was an anthropomorphic killer whale named "Klee Wyck". "Klee Wyck", meaning "the laughing one", was a nickname that had been given to Canadian painter and sculptor Emily Carr by the Ucluelet First Nation.

The 2013 video game Phoenix Wright: Ace Attorney - Dual Destinies features a performing killer whale being tried in court. The killer whale, which is referred to mostly as an orca, is defended by the titular character Phoenix Wright on the charge of killing its owner. In the second trial day the killer whale is cross-examined via telecast, although her testimony consists completely of whale noises. She is eventually proven innocent of all killings. Interestingly, the episode seems to have the implicit message that the fact killer whales do not use human language does not mean they do not have feelings nor a right to be heard.

The Vancouver Canucks of the National Hockey League features an orca whale in its logo.

== See also ==
- List of individual cetaceans
