= Humphrey the Whale =

Humpback whale famous for visits to San Francisco Bay

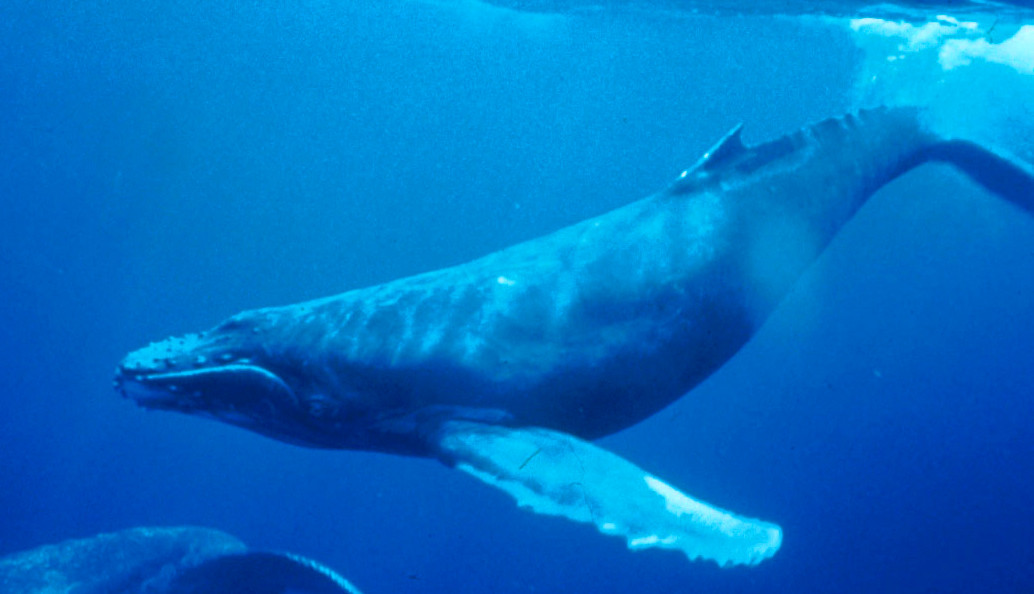
- Humpback whales in the open ocean
- Species: Megaptera novaeangliae
- Sex: Male
- Known for: Entering San Francisco Bay during annual migration in 1985 and 1990

Humphrey the Whale is a humpback whale that twice deviated from his Mexico to Alaska migration by entering San Francisco Bay. This behavior is unusual for a humpback whale, and Humphrey attracted wide media attention when he entered the bay in both 1985 and 1990. Both of his bay incursions resulted in rescue by the Marine Mammal Center, based in Marin County, California, assisted by the United States Coast Guard and hundreds of volunteers.

The last sighting of Humphrey was in the vicinity of the Farallon Islands in 1991.

== Description ==
The humpback whale is a mammal which belongs to the baleen whale suborder. An adult usually ranges between 12–16 m (39–52 ft) long and weighs approximately 36,000 kilograms (79,000 pounds), or 36 tonnes (40 short tons). It is well known for its breaching, its unusually long front fins, and its complex whale song. The humpback whale lives in oceans and seas around the world.

Humpback whales have a stocky body with well-defined humps and black upper elements. The head and lower jaw are covered with knobs called tubercles, which are actually hair follicles and are characteristic of the species. The tail flukes, which are lifted high in the dive sequence, have wavy rear edges.

Individual humpbacks have unique patterns on their long black and white tail fins and pectoral fins that allow scientists to positively identify them.

== Humphrey's journeys inland ==
=== 1985 ===
In 1985, a 40-foot-long (12-meter) humpback entered San Francisco Bay and was followed closely on the evening news by Bay Area television stations. After a few days in the bay, the whale, nicknamed Humphrey, swam up the Sacramento River into a freshwater habitat. The whale, first spotted at Oakland's Outer Harbor on October 10, 1985, swam up the Carquinez Strait, the Sacramento River and under the Rio Vista Bridge to a dead-end slough 69 miles (111 kilometers) from the ocean.

Numerous attempts to coax him back to the ocean failed. One initial attempt involved playing sounds of orcas to frighten Humphrey into leaving. Another attempt was made using a "sound net" in which people in a flotilla of boats made unpleasant noises behind the whale by banging on steel pipes, a Japanese fishing technique known as "oikomi". Several weeks of being trapped in the fresh water of the Sacramento Delta brought signs of physical stress in the whale. His skin was graying and he was becoming more and more listless. None of the traditional herding techniques were working, and Humphrey appeared to be dying.

As a last-ditch effort to save the whale, Dr. Louis Herman, a researcher of dolphins and humpback whales, postulated that it would be possible to lure it out by playing acoustic recordings of whale social and feeding sounds. Dr. Diana Reiss, a dolphin researcher and a member of the rescue team was appointed to head the playback operation. The actual recordings used were of humpback whales feeding in Alaskan waters and were obtained from Dr. Scott Baker. Bernie Krause, an acoustician, offered to loop the recordings of humpback whale feeding songs. However, to get the sounds into the water required a powerful speaker and amplification system that only the Navy was likely to have. Krause contacted Greg Pless who was in charge of the underwater acoustics research laboratory for the Naval Postgraduate School in Monterey, California, where one of the few high-power J-11 underwater transducers existed in the country. Pless and his colleague Dale Galarowicz quickly gained Navy permission and rushed the equipment to Rio Vista where Humphrey was last seen.

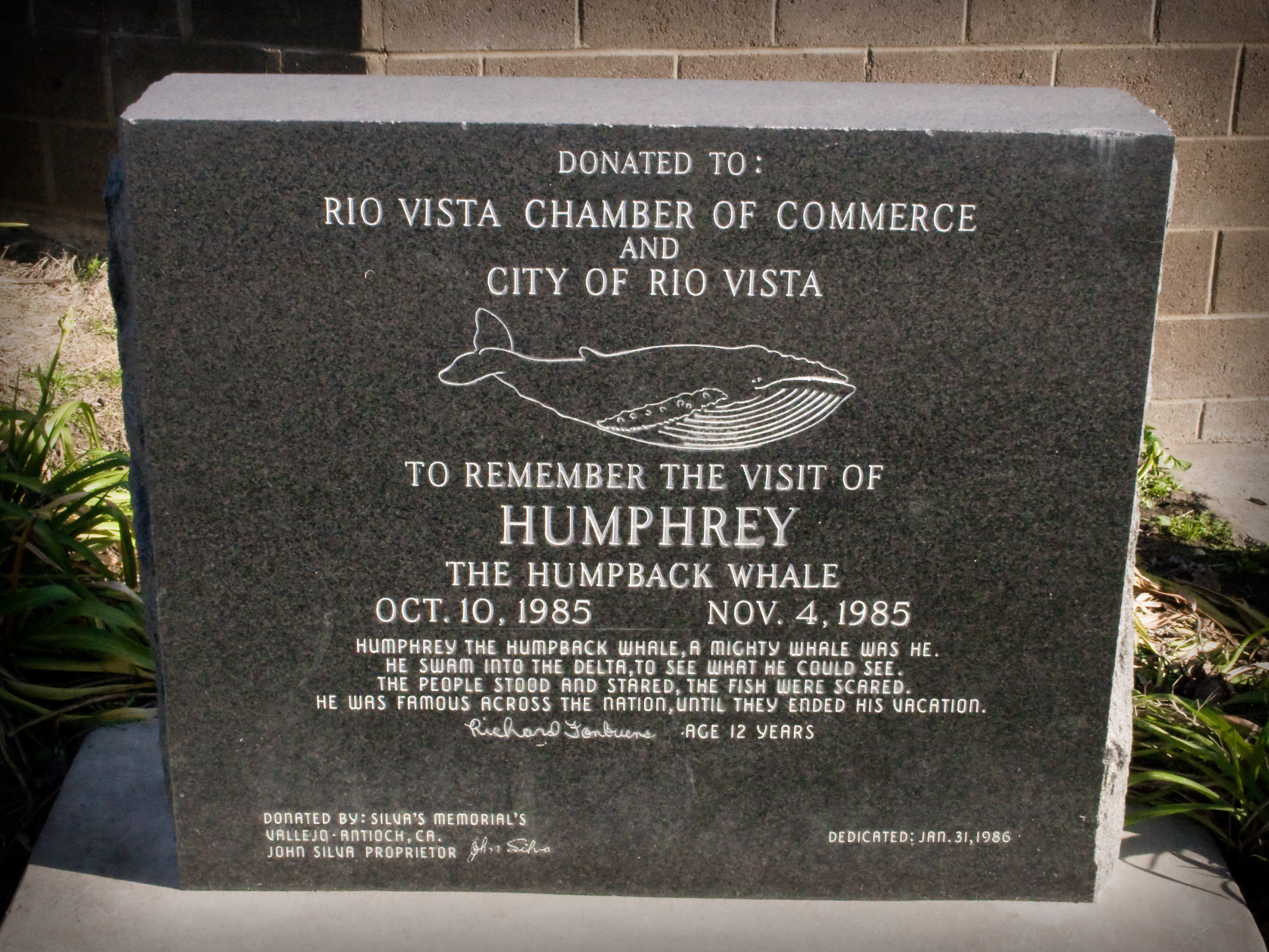
Granite monument in Rio Vista

Early the next morning, the equipment was loaded onto the private yacht, Boot Legger, loaned by its owner for the rescue effort. Directed to the location in the slough where Humphrey was last seen, the speaker was lowered over the side of the boat, the sounds were played, and Humphrey emerged from the water at the bow of the ship. The captain quickly started down the river with Humphrey close in tow. With the assistance of numerous fish and wildlife agencies, including the Army's 481st Transportation Company (Heavy Boat), the crew led him the many miles back down the Sacramento river, alternately playing and not playing the whale songs to keep his interest. Large numbers of spectators lined the banks of the river.

As they approached the San Francisco Bay and the water gained in salinity, Humphrey became visibly excited and began sounding. Though the crew lost sight of him that night, they picked him back up in the morning and led him out through the Golden Gate Bridge into the Pacific Ocean on November 4, 1985, at 4:36 p.m. The town of Rio Vista later erected a commemorative granite marker at City Hall at the east end of Main Street. A restaurant in Antioch was named Humphrey's in the whale's honor. The restaurant has since been remodeled and its name changed to 'Smith's Landing Seafood Grill'.

=== 1990 ===
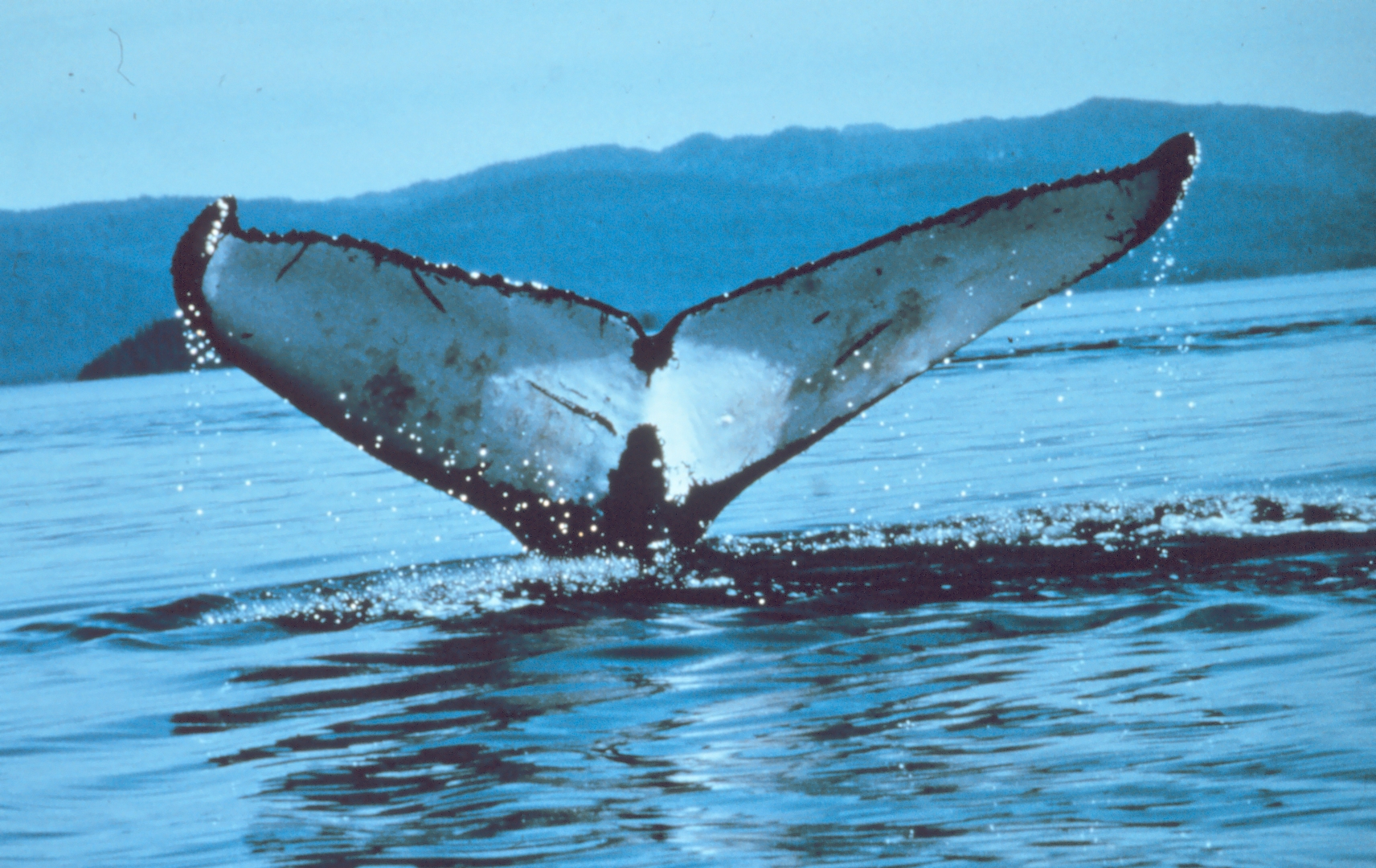
Tail flukes have unique markings allowing identification of each individual.

Humphrey stayed a considerable time in 1990 in the embayment immediately north of Sierra Point in Brisbane where occupants of the Dakin Building could observe his antics. Humphrey became beached on a mudflat in San Francisco Bay to the north of Sierra Point and to the south of Candlestick Park. He was extricated from the mudflat with a large cargo net and support from the Marine Mammal Center and the U.S. Coast Guard Cutter Point Brower 82372 as the on scene leader supported by smaller Coast Guard Cutters.

This time, he was successfully guided back to the Pacific Ocean using a combination of "oikomi" simultaneously with the broadcast of attractive sounds of humpback whales preparing to feed from a boat headed towards the open ocean. Researchers Louis Herman and Bernie Krause led a team of scientists who used sound recordings of natural whale feeding vocalizations to guide Humphrey back to safety. These sounds were produced for a swimming trajectory of 50 miles (80 km) until Humphrey reached the Pacific Ocean, sometimes attaining speeds of 30 miles per hour (48 km/h).

== Later sightings ==
Cascadia Research Collective spotted Humphrey in 1986, 1987 and 1988 outside the Bay.

Humphrey has been seen only once since the second misadventure, at the Farallon Islands in 1991.

== In media ==
- A film, Humphrey the Lost Whale, was produced and opened at the Tybee Island Marine Science Center, Savannah, Georgia on September 24, 2005.
- MC Lars has a song entitled "Humphrey the Whale" on his 2003 album Radio Pet Fencing which repeats the lyrics "Humphrey the Whale should get GPS".
- Golden Gate Transit had a Rapid Transit Series bus with a painting of Humphrey (by George Summer) nicknamed Humphrey the Whale Bus (officially named Pollution Solution). The bus entered service in February 1993 and retired in 2004 after logging more than 500,000 miles (800,000 km) of service. Golden Gate Transit auctioned the bus on eBay in June 2004. A new Humphrey the Whale Bus, manufactured by Orion International and also painted by summer, was unveiled in August 2005.
- Humphrey the Lost Whale: A True Story is a 1986 children's picture book written by Wendy Tokuda and Richard David Hall and illustrated by Hanako Wakiyama.
- Humphrey the Wayward Whale is a 1986 children's picture book written by Ernest Callenbach and Christine Leefeldt and illustrated by Carl Dennis Buell.
- A song, "Humphrey the Humpback Whale", was composed by Stone Valley Elementary School teacher Ann Fox and performed by her students during assembly.
- In the video game “Omori”, Humphrey serves as a location as well as the final mandatory boss fight of the headspace segments.

== See also ==
- Timmy (whale)
- Delta and Dawn
- List of individual cetaceans
