= Radio Pet Fencing =

Studio album by MC Lars
- Released: 2003
- Genre: Hip-hop
- Length: 48:11
- Label: Truck/Horris

MC Lars chronology
Insectivorous (2000)	Radio Pet Fencing (2003)	The Laptop EP (2004)

Professional ratings
Review scores
Source	Rating
AllMusic	3.5/5 stars

Radio Pet Fencing is the third record by rapper MC Lars, the last record released with his former stage surname Horris, and his first record to be released outside of the United States.

All songs on the 2003 album were written by Lars, except "Escape from Robot Island", co-written by Timothy Thompson.

== Track listing ==
1. "Hey That's Me"
2. "Yes I Am an Alien"
3. "Atom You're Awesome"
4. "Certified"
5. "Mr. Wormsly's Addiction"
6. "The Séance at Harpers Ferry"
7. "My Rhymes Rhyme"
8. "Rapbeth (Foul Is Fair)"
9. "Make Way for Ducklings"
10. "Humphrey the Whale"
11. "Sarah"
12. "Escape from Robot Island"
  - Featuring MNP

== Additional musicians ==
- PJ McCombs – electric bass
- DJ Raymundo – scratching
- Craig Brown – drums on "Humphrey the Whale"
- Michael Love – keyboards on "Escape from Robot Island"
- Timothy Thompson – vocals on "Escape from Robot Island"
- Wesley Willis - vocals on "Yes I am an Alien"
