= Chimo (orca) =

Partially albino female orca (died 1972)

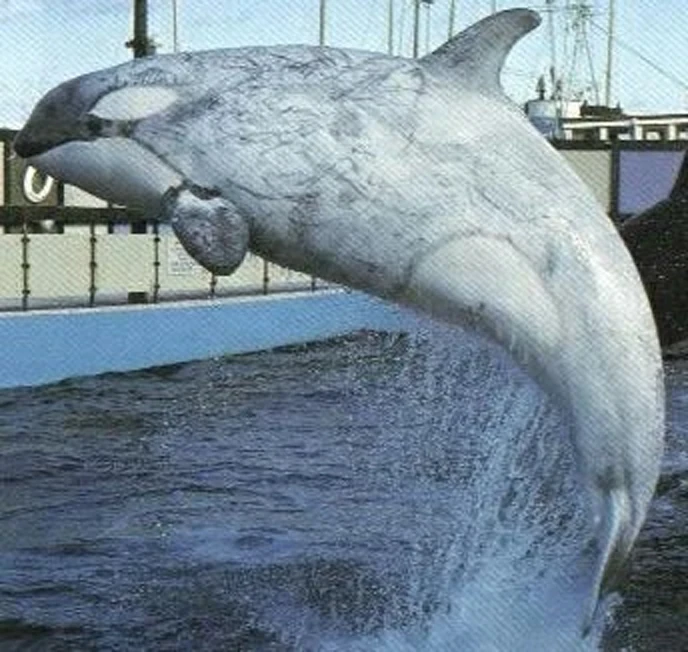
- Species: Orcinus orca
- Sex: Female
- Died: 1972
- Years active: 1970–1972

Chimo (also designated T004 or T4, died 1972) was a female orca with albinism captured from Peddar Bay in the Salish Sea in 1970 and exhibited at Sealand of the Pacific in Oak Bay, British Columbia, Canada until her death in 1972. Chimo was not the first albino orca spotted in the wild, but she is notable for being the first captured and closely studied. Chimo's probable mother was another orca by the name of Scarredjaw Cow (T003 or T3), captured along with Chimo. She died in 1972 from complications caused by Chédiak–Higashi syndrome.

Years before her capture, another white orca was spotted in what is suspected to be the same pod; this orca, named "Alice", was never captured and vanished in the 1960s.

In 2009, a fishing vessel off the Alaskan Peninsula spotted a healthy male killer whale who was almost completely white. He was dubbed Iceberg.

== See also ==
- Iceberg (orca)
- Tilikum (orca)
- List of individual cetaceans
