= Timor Tom =

Individual sperm whale

Timor Tom or Old Tom is a sperm whale from the 19th century, referenced in Herman Melville's Moby-Dick.

The only reference in the book is:

Was it not so, O Timor Tom! thou famed leviathan, scarred like an iceberg, who so long did'st lurk in the Oriental straits of that name, whose spout was oft seen from the palmy beach of Ombay?

— Ishmael, in Herman Melville, "Chapter 45: The Affidavit", Moby-Dick: Or, the Whale (18 October 1851)

Ombay may reference the island of Pantar, across the Ombai Strait from Timor.

Dr. Lawrence Blair in his TV program Myths Magic and Monsters, suggests that Timor Tom was a gigantic albino sperm whale, who did not flee whalers, but attacked them and drowned many of them instead.

== See also ==
- List of individual cetaceans
