= The Marine Mammal Center =

Marine Mammal

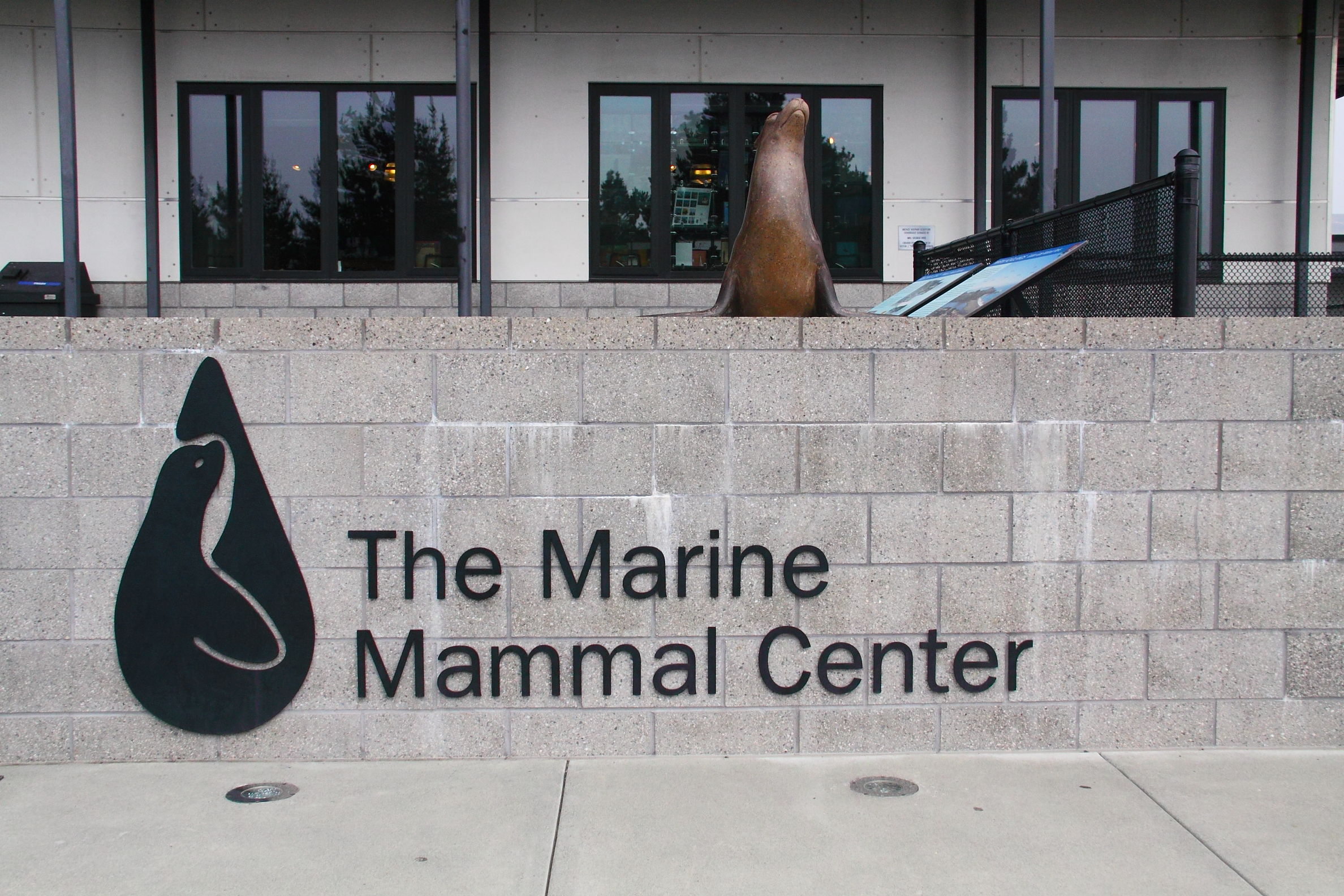
- Headquarters front entrance
- Interactive map of Marine Mammal
- 37.8351°N 122.5316°W
- Date opened: 1975
- Location: Sausalito, California, United States
- Website: www.marinemammalcenter.org

The Marine Mammal Center (TMMC) is a private, non-profit U.S. organization that was established in 1975 for the purpose of rescuing, rehabilitating and releasing marine mammals who are injured, sick or abandoned. It was founded in Sausalito, California, by Lloyd Smalley, Pat Arrigoni and Paul Maxwell. Since 1975, TMMC has rescued over 28,000 marine mammals. It also serves as a center for environmental research and education regarding marine mammals, namely cetaceans (whales, dolphins and porpoises), pinnipeds (seals, fur seals, walruses and sea lions), otters and sirenians (manatees and dugongs). Marine mammal abandonment refers to maternal separation; pups that have been separated from their mother before weaning. At the center, they receive specialized veterinary care: they are diagnosed, treated, rehabilitated and ideally, released back into the wild. Animals in need of assistance are usually identified by a member of the public who has contacted the center. These animals represent the following major species: California sea lions, northern elephant seals, Pacific harbor seals, northern fur seals, Guadalupe fur seals, Hawaiian monk seals, and southern sea otters. On a few occasions, TMMC has taken in Steller sea lions and bottlenose/Pacific white-sided dolphins. The only non-mammals that TMMC takes in are sea turtles.

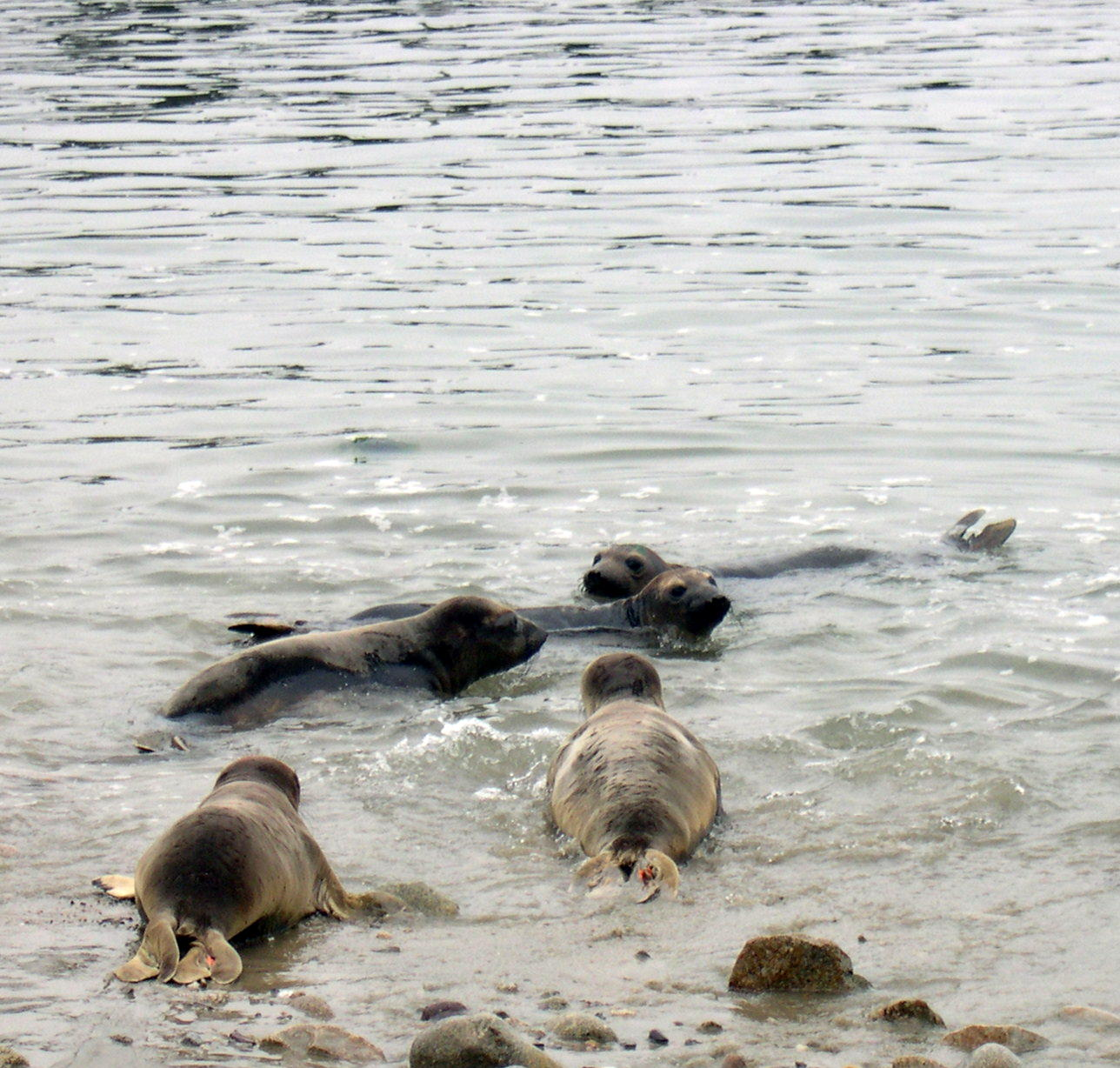
Release of rehabilitated pinnipeds into the Pacific Ocean

== Research ==
The research team consists of veterinarians and biologists who conduct not only medical diagnosis and intervention, but also publish scientific reports on marine animal health in relation to the Pacific Ocean’s environmental chemistry. They collaborate with other institutions to provide vital information on disease, immunological systems and environmental effects. Some patients are fitted with radio or satellite tags before release, to further specific research goals. The center collaborates with counterparts around the world (most notably from England, Canada, Mexico, Brazil, Australia, Scotland, the Netherlands, France and Germany) in working on complex cases, and also researches the interactions of ocean-dwelling mammals with the marine environment in collaboration with other institutions.

Researchers at TMMC have discovered that domoic acid (DA) is the causative agent responsible for illness in a great many California sea lions. DA is naturally produced by the diatom Pseudo-nitzschia. DA passes up the food chain as the diatoms are consumed by zooplankton. These zooplankton are then consumed by fish, where the toxin accumulates. Fish are unharmed by it, but mammals are. California sea lions are disproportionately affected because they feed closer to shore, where more of these diatoms are present. When consumed by marine mammals, DA activates neural pathways in the brain, specifically, the hippocampus. This neural activation is unregulated and results in seizures. Repeated exposure will cause repeated activation, ultimately burning out these neural pathways and causing permanent brain damage — specifically, atrophy of the hippocampus. Domoic acid is the same biotoxin that causes amnesic shellfish poisoning in humans.

Another discovery by TMMC, in collaboration with the University of Florida, is that seal pox is distinct from pox viruses isolated from other species. It is unrelated to chicken pox or smallpox. Also being investigated is the increased incidence of leptospirosis, a bacterial pathogen that can acutely damage the kidneys of marine mammals.

The Marine Mammal Center has made advances in the use of general anesthesia on marine mammals, used during surgical procedures. To a certain extent, marine mammals are voluntary breathers. Pinnipeds (seals, sea lions and fur seals) can reduce their respiratory rate in order to conserve oxygen and remain underwater for extended periods. This makes the use of general anesthesia and tranquilizing darts more problematic.

Any animal that dies in treatment, or is euthanized while at the center, will undergo a necropsy to further research. At the center, there is a viewing area where the public can observe the procedure. Animals are only euthanized if their illness or injury is beyond treatment and would lead to the animal's death, or unabated suffering. Considering that animals in need are only identified when their distress is significant enough to be observable by the public, it is not unusual for some of these animals to be beyond rehabilitation.

== Education ==
The education outreach program reaches in excess of 100,000 school children and adults each year, emphasizing the human connection to the marine environment. In addition to the groups of children who visit the center, there formerly was a program called 'Sea to School' that visits Bay Area Schools. The hope is that with a better understanding of the ocean and its inhabitants, communities will care for and respect the oceans.

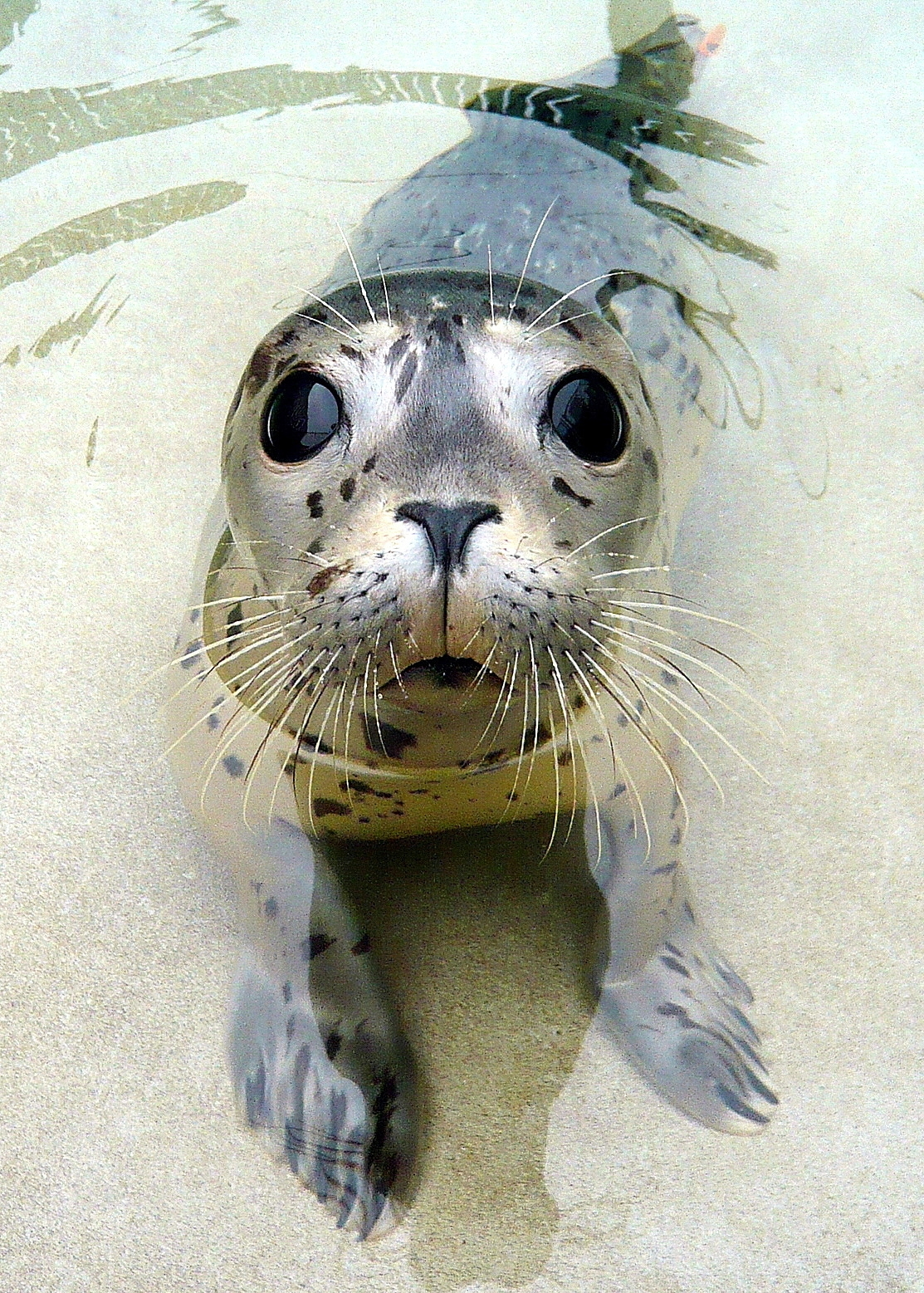
Kiotari, a female Pacific harbor seal pup, was rescued on May 1, 2010, from Ross Cove at Fitzgerald Marine Reserve in San Mateo. She had been separated from her mother shortly after birth. Kiotari was malnourished and suffering from flipper trauma and an umbilical infection. She was treated and released on July 24, 2010, at Point Reyes Marine Reserve, having gained over 10 kg. The spot patterns on a Pacific harbor seal are unique to a particular individual. Photo by Aaron J. Cohen for The Marine Mammal Center.

== Rescue and rehabilitation ==
The ultimate goal is for every animal rescued by TMMC to be released back to the ocean with a second chance at life. Since 1975, the center has rescued over 24,000 marine mammals, mostly California sea lions, northern elephant seals and Pacific harbor seals. The center can have upwards of 275 animals at the hospital at one time. In the spring time, the center rescues mostly young elephant seals and harbor seal pups that have been separated from their mothers due to either big storms or human interaction, or once weaned from their mother, were unable to find food on their own. In the summer time, the center rescues mostly California sea lions that are approximately 1 year old and have struggled to find food on their own, or adults suffering from different diseases, such as domoic acid toxicosis, leptospirosis or cancer. The center also rescues approximately 80–100 animals each year due to negative human interaction, such as entanglement in plastic or fishing gear, ingestion of trash, harassment on the beach and even gunshot wounds. At the center, volunteers and veterinarians provide round-the-clock care for the patients to help them recover, ranging from administering medication and food to patients, teaching young seals to catch and eat fish, and performing medical procedures like x-rays, surgeries and ultrasounds.

In almost all cases, the animals can be treated and returned to their ocean home. In rare cases, less than 1% of the time, animals that are rescued may be deemed unreleasable. If an animal has been released on two occasions and returns both times, it may have become habituated with people and is no longer capable of fending for itself. Some animals may have suffered injuries that have left them blind or otherwise disabled. Although their health is stable, they may no longer be able to survive independently in the wild. These too, are considered unreleasable. In these circumstances, TMMC works with the National Oceanic and Atmospheric Administration (NOAA) and the National Marine Fisheries Service (NMFS) to find a permanent home for the animal in an approved zoo or aquarium. In May, 2011, the San Francisco Zoo accepted two such animals. Both are male California sea lions, named Silent Knight and Henry. Silent Knight was shot and blinded in Sausalito in December 2010. The cause of Henry's blindness is unknown. There was no external injury to the eyes and the cause may be neurological.

== Facilities, budget and governance ==
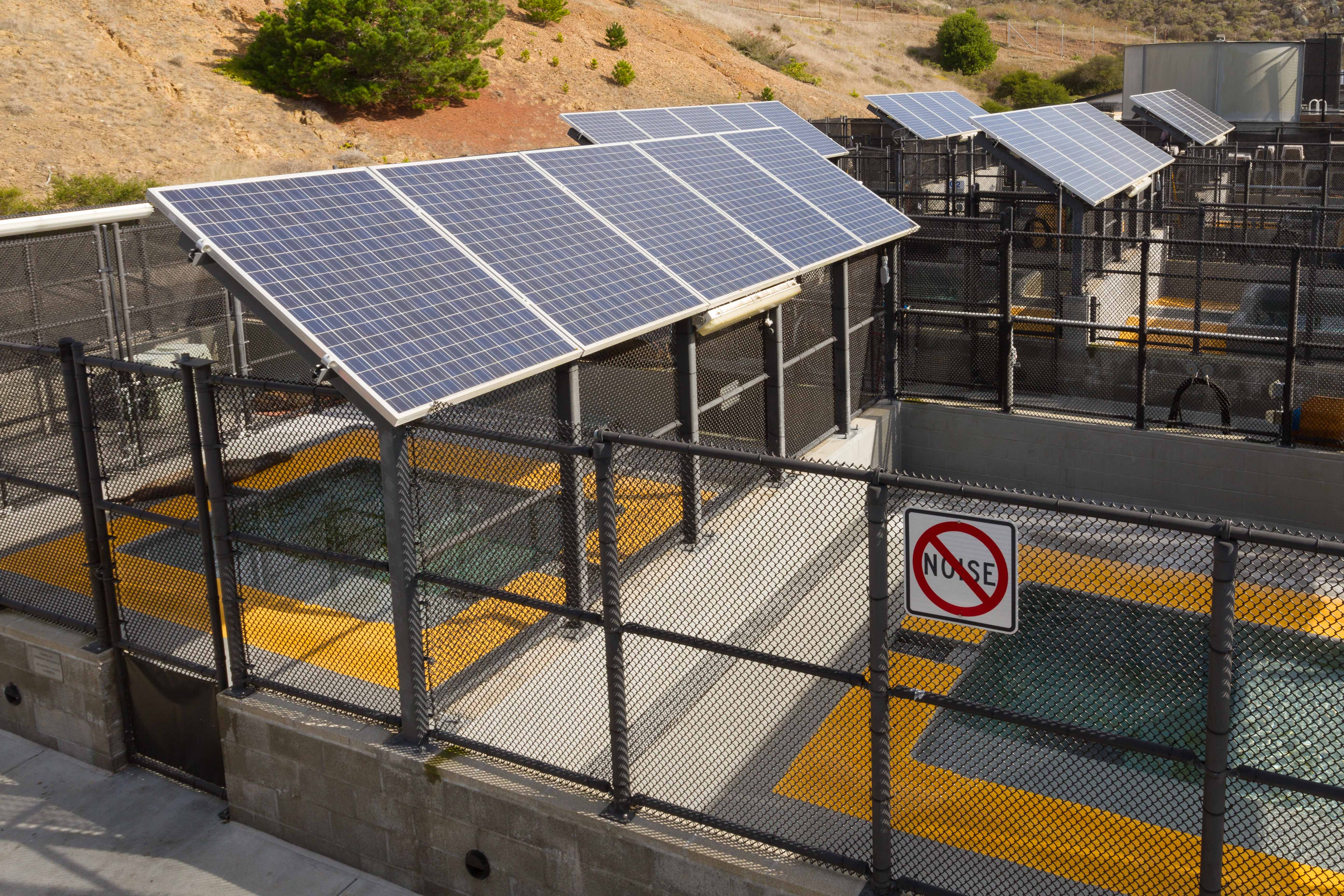
Marine Mammal Center in the Marin Headlands

Facilities include the Marin Headlands headquarters and field stations in San Luis Obispo, Monterey, Anchor Bay and Fort Bragg. The center's animal rescue radius is along the Pacific Coast of California and comprises approximately 600 square miles, between San Luis Obispo and Mendocino.

The Marine Mammal Center facility is located at what was once part of a former Nike Missile site. From 1953 to 1979, the United States Army built and operated over 265 Nike missile batteries throughout the United States. The best preserved installation is in the Marin Headlands, known as SF88. It was intended to protect local civilian and military populations against attack by Soviet bomber aircraft. It was opened in 1954, equipped with Nike Ajax missiles and later converted to hold improved Nike Hercules missiles. The site was decommissioned in 1974. Portions of the site, including three Nike Hercules missiles, can be visited through the Golden Gate National Park Service on limited days and hours.

TMMC opened in 1975, one year after the closure of the missile site. Underground silos now house the facility's water filtration system. A small structure nearby was once a guard house. The exterior remains unchanged, but it is now part of the Harbor Seal Hospital and also holds a surgical suite. Neither the former silo, nor the former guard house are open to the public.

The Marine Mammal Center is entirely privately funded. In 2012, the yearly operating budget for the center was approximately $7,500,000. 81% of expenditures went directly to animal care, veterinary expenses, and educational programs. In 2012, 76% of TMMC's operating budget came from private donations and individual and family memberships. The center presently has a paid staff of 45 individuals. Its operation is reliant on several hundred volunteers who are trained in rescue, release, animal care and education.

The main facility in Sausalito can accommodate approximately 1,200 animals a year, although a typical year brings in between 600 and 800 patients. In 2009, a lack of available fish related to the El Nino weather pattern brought 1,750 patients to TMMC, more than in any other year since it opened. 2012 marked the year with the highest percentage of survivability for all patients to date. In the spring of 2013, environmental conditions limited to Southern California resulted in a higher than normal number of sea lion strandings. During this period, TMMC has taken in the overflow, approximately 65 patients.

=== Growth ===
The Marine Mammal Center began in 1975 with bath tubs and small pools surrounded by a fence. In June 2009, a multi-facility complex was opened to hold both the animals and the staff. It was built with recycled materials and utilizes sound boards made of sea weed. Donated solar panels provide approximately 20% of the facility's energy. Water, which was previously a major expense, is now filtered through an advanced sand bed and ozone system which allows a water recovery rate of 80%.

During the reconstruction, numerous outdoor pens with pools and haul-out surfaces were created. There are also special purpose facilities, including a veterinary hospital, records room, food preparation and storage rooms and rescue equipment storage area. The hospital includes an operating room, treatment areas, an office and pharmaceutical storage. Some of the hospital functions include thoracic surgery, gastrointestinal surgery and orthopedic surgery, as well as routine examinations and blood sampling for patient diagnosis.

== Notable actions ==
Some specific examples among the thousands of successful outcomes are:

Net entangled humpback whale. In December 2005, a large female humpback whale was rescued off of the Farallon Islands, after she became entangled in crab pot lines during her migration, most likely to wintering grounds near Mexico. The daring maneuver was carried out by center staff and volunteers, along with professional divers, and was the center's first successful open ocean rescue of a whale entangled in netting.

Orphaned Steller sea lion pup at Año Nuevo Island. In 1999, a malnourished 37 lb. (17 kg) pup was found stranded alone at a location known as a northern elephant seal rookery, but not as a birthing location for Steller sea lions. The pup, named Artemis, was restored to health and returned to the wild. In July 2005, she was again spotted on Año Nuevo Island, but this time she was giving birth to a new pup. This was a particularly unusual outcome, since no pup is known to have been born on that island for at least twenty years.

Humphrey the Whale is arguably the most widely publicized humpback whale in history, having errantly entered San Francisco Bay twice, departing from his Mexico to Alaska migration. Each excursion resulted in dramatic estuarine rescues in 1985 and 1990 by the center, assisted by the United States Coast Guard and hundreds of volunteers. The first rescue was actually to turn Humphrey around in the Sacramento River, while the second was to move him back into the water from the mudflats north of Sierra Point below the Dakin Building.

Baker D., a bottlenose dolphin was successfully rehabilitated and released to join a dolphin pod in Monterey Bay in November 2004.

Sergeant Nevis. On December 5, 2009, a 650 lb. adult, male California sea lion was rescued from Knight's Landing in Yolo County, Northern California. Sgt. Nevis had suffered a shotgun wound to his sinuses. He was named after Yolo County police officer Michael Nevis, who assisted with his rescue. Imaging tests revealed that this had not been Sgt. Nevis' first run-in with a shotgun. Buckshot pellets .in his head evidenced that he had been shot several times previously. After months of treatment and rehabilitation, it was determined that he could not survive if returned to the ocean. In association with NOAA, he was transferred to permanent residence at Six Flags Discovery Kingdom in Vallejo, California.

The U.S. Marine Mammal Protection Act of 1972, and later amendments, make it a federal crime to hunt, kill, capture and/or harass any marine mammal. State laws and local ordinances may provide additional restrictions and penalties.

On October 8, 2010, Sgt. Nevis had major reconstructive surgery to close the opening in his face created by the entry and exit of the shotgun slug. The complicated surgery was needed to cover the crater-like wound under his eyes. The injury had forced Sgt. Nevis to modify his breathing. He was unable to dive or even submerge his head under water. There was also a continuing risk of infection. Facial reconstruction surgeon Dr. Praful Ramenini donated his services for this delicate surgery. Ramenini was supported by center veterinarians Dr. Bill Van Bonn and Dr. Vanessa Fravel, as well as veterinarians Dr. Diana Procter and Dr. Nancy Anderson from Six Flags Discovery Kingdom.

On October 15, 2010, the Sutter County District Attorney's Office announced the successful criminal prosecution of a fisherman for the shooting of Sgt. Nevis. He was convicted of intentionally maiming or wounding a living animal, in violation of California Penal Code Section 597. He was sentenced to 30 days in jail, five years of probation and ordered to pay restitution of $51,081.48 to TMMC, toward the expenses of treating Sgt. Nevis.

Movie Trivia. In Peter Jackson's Lord of the Rings trilogy, elephant seal and sea lion vocalizations were recorded at TMMC and used as the main component for the sound of the Orcs (northern elephant seals) and the Uruks (California sea lions). Sound Designer David Farmer had, coincidentally, visited the center during elephant seal pupping season and was suitably impressed.

== See also ==
- Cetacean Conservation Center
- Endangered species
- Moss Landing Marine Laboratories
- Institute for Marine Mammal Studies
- Red tide
