= Orca types and populations =

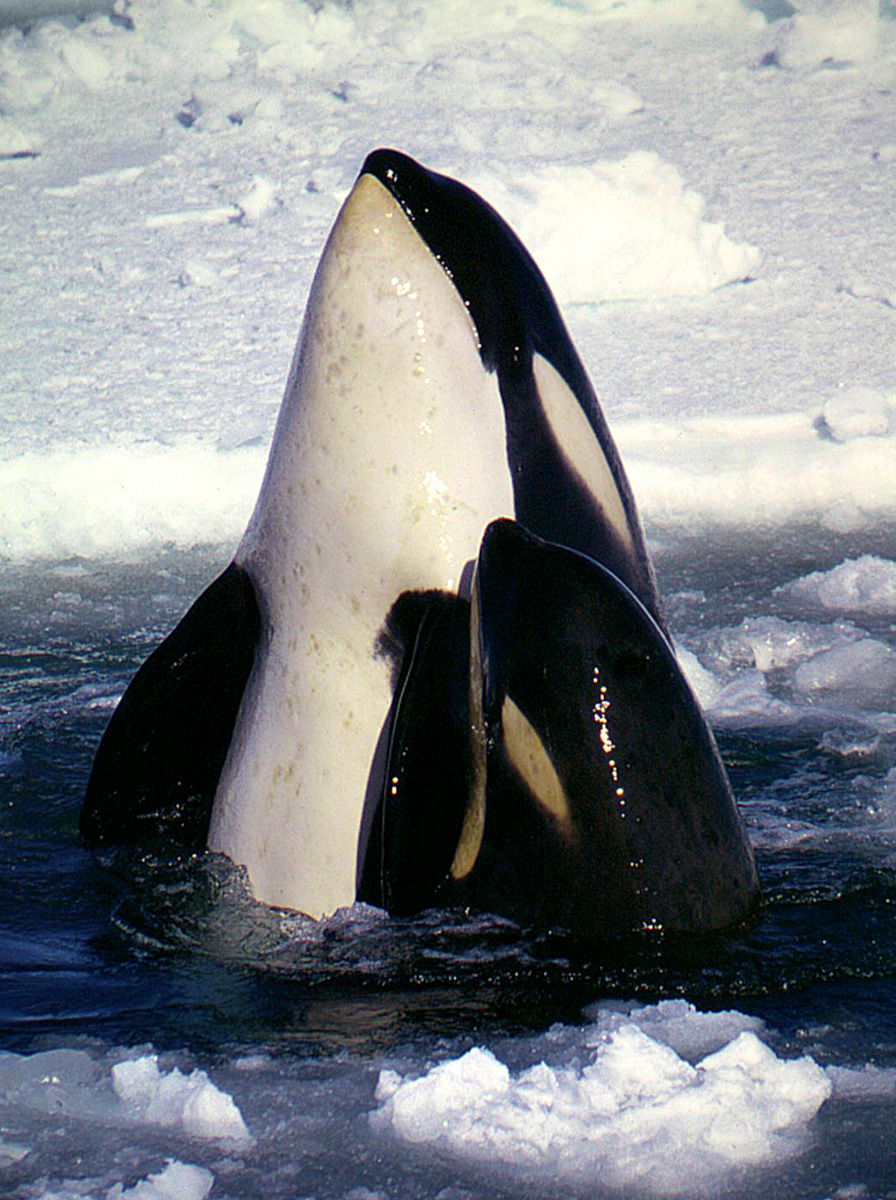
Type C orcas in the Ross Sea in the Southern Ocean: The eye patch slants forward.

Orcas, also called killer whales, have a cosmopolitan distribution and several distinct populations or types have been documented or suggested. Three to five types of orcas may be distinct enough to be considered different races, subspecies, or possibly even species (see species problem).

The IUCN reported in 2008, "The taxonomy of this genus is clearly in need of review, and it is likely that O. orca will be split into a number of different species or at least subspecies over the next few years." However, large variation in the ecological distinctiveness of different orca groups complicate simple differentiation into types. Mammal-eating orcas in different regions were long thought likely to be closely related, but genetic testing has refuted this hypothesis. Very often, the main distinction can be whether they are resident in a single area e.g., a specific island, or migrant covering different areas. Orcas usually live and travel in pods or a family group led by the dominant female.

== Northern waters ==
=== North Pacific ===
Research off the west coast of Canada and the United States in the 1970s and 1980s identified the following three types:

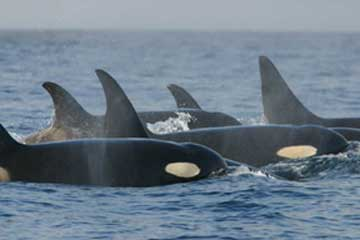
Resident (fish-eating) orcas: The curved dorsal fins are typical of resident females.

- Resident: These are the most commonly sighted of the three populations in the coastal waters of the northeast Pacific.
  - Southern Alaskan resident orcas are distributed from southeastern Alaska to the Kodiak Archipelago and number over 700 individuals. These whales consist of two interbreeding clans distinguished by acoustic calls and whose ranges overlap.
  - Northern: The northern resident community lives in coastal and inland waters from southeastern Alaska to Vancouver Island. It consists of three clans and 16 pods and number over 300 orcas total.
  - Southern: The southern resident community generally inhabits the inland waters of southern British Columbia and Washington, but can be found in the outer waters off Vancouver Island, Washington, Oregon and California. They consist of one clan and three pods, number fewer than 80 individuals, and are listed as endangered.

- Transient or Bigg's: The diets of these orcas consist almost exclusively of marine mammals. They live in the same areas as residents, but the two avoid each other. Transients generally travel in small groups, usually of two to six animals, but sometimes on rare occasions pods merge into groups of 200. They have less persistent family bonds than residents. Transients vocalize in less variable and less complex dialects. Female transients are characterized by more triangular and pointed dorsal fins than those of residents. The saddle patches of transients are solid and uniformly grey (in contrast to the residents saddle patches that often have more black-coloring). Transients roam widely along the coast; some individuals have been sighted in both southern Alaska and California. Transients are also referred to as Bigg's orca in honour of cetologist Michael Bigg. The term has become increasingly common and may eventually replace the transient label. The transient ecotype is estimated to have diverged 700,000 years ago. Traditionally three different "stocks" of transients off North America have been recognized
  - AT1 stock which occurs from Prince William Sound to Kenai Fjords is considered a depleted stock; it was affected by the Exxon Valdez oil spill and declined from 22 to 8 individuals, between 1989 and 2004
  - Gulf of Alaska/Aleutian Islands/Bering Sea (GOA/AI/BS) stock may number around 500 orcas
  - West coast stock which ranges from southeast Alaska to California, may be divided into sub-communities. These transients number over 320 orcas, with over 200 along southeast Alaska, British Columbia and Washington, and over 100 orcas off California.
- A 2025 genetic study of transient orcas from British Columbia to California found that they are two subpopulations
  - An inner coast subpopulation that inhabits inland and nearshore waters like the Salish Sea.
  - An outer coast subpopulation that ranges in continental shelf waters up to 20 km (12 mi) from shore including the submarine canyons of Monterey Bay.

- Offshore: A third population of orcas in the northeast Pacific was discovered in 1988, when a humpback whale researcher observed them in open water. As their name suggests, they travel far from shore and feed primarily on schooling fish. However, because they have large, scarred and nicked dorsal fins resembling those of mammal-hunting transients, it may be that they also eat mammals and sharks. They have mostly been encountered off the west coast of Vancouver Island and near Haida Gwaii. Offshores typically congregate in groups of 20–75, with occasional sightings of larger groups of up to 200. Little is known about their habits, but they are genetically distinct from residents and transients. Offshores appear to be smaller than the others, and females are characterized by dorsal fin tips that are continuously rounded. They have been spotted in Monterey Bay in California.

At least 195 individual orcas have been cataloged in the eastern tropical Pacific, ranging from Baja California and the Gulf of California in the north to the northwest coast of South America in the south and west towards Hawaii. Orcas appear to regularly occur off the Galápagos Islands. Orcas sighted in Hawaiian waters may belong to a greater population in the central Pacific.

Separate fish-eating and mammal-eating orca communities also exist off the coast of the Russian Far East and Hokkaido, Japan. Russian orcas are commonly seen around the Kamchatka Peninsula and Commander Islands. Over 2,000 individual resident-like orcas and 130 transient-like orcas have been identified off Russia. Residents' diets consist primarily of fish and sometimes squid, and they live in complex and cohesive family groups called pods. Female residents characteristically have rounded dorsal fin tips that terminate in a sharp corner.

=== North Atlantic and adjacent ===
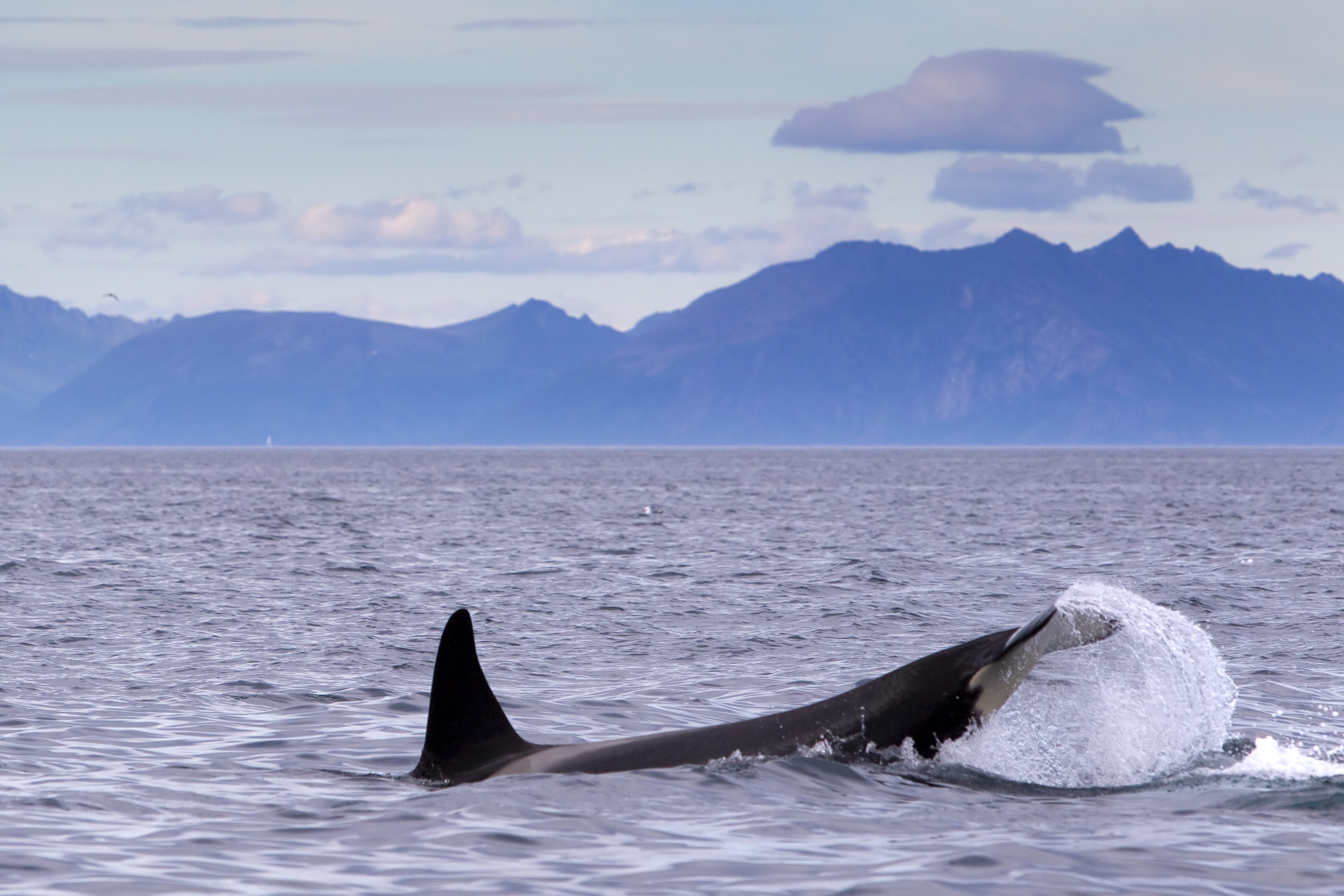
Orca tail-slapping in Vestfjorden, Norway

At least 15,000 whales are estimated to inhabit the North Atlantic. In the Northeast Atlantic, two orca ecotypes have been proposed. Type 1 orcas consist of seven haplotypes and include herring-eating orcas of Norway and Iceland and mackerel-eating orcas of the North Sea, as well as seal-eating orcas off Norway. Type 2 orcas consist of two haplotypes, and mainly feed on baleen whales. These two types have now been dropped from the classification, because of a lack of samples for type 2 (5 individuals) and how little it was representative of a potential ecotype.

In the Mediterranean Sea, orcas are considered "visitors", likely from the North Atlantic, and sightings become less frequent further east. However, a small year-round population exists in the Strait of Gibraltar, which numbered around 39 in 2011. From 2020, this population started ramming vessels and damaging their rudders. Distinct populations may also exist off the west coast of tropical Africa, which have generalized diets.

The northwest Atlantic population is found year-round around Labrador and Newfoundland, while some individuals seasonally travel to the waters of the eastern Canadian Arctic when the ice has melted. Sightings of these whales have been documented as far south as Cape Cod and Long Island. This population is possibly continuous with orcas sighted off Greenland. Orcas are sighted year-round in the Caribbean Sea, and an estimated 267 (as of 2020) are documented in the northern Gulf of Mexico.

Recent studies using dietary tracers such as fatty acids and organic contaminants have shown how varied the diet of North Atlantic orcas is. For example, orcas in the Eastern North Atlantic (Norway, Faroe Islands, Iceland) mainly feed on fish, specifically herring. Meanwhile, those in the Central North Atlantic (Greenland) prefer to consume seals such as ringed, harp, hooded, and bearded seals. Finally, orcas in the Western North Atlantic (Eastern Canadian Arctic and Eastern Canada) tend to prey on other whale species, such as belugas and narwhals in the Arctic and baleen whales and porpoises in Eastern Canada.

=== Northern Indian Ocean ===
Over 50 individual whales have been cataloged in the northern Indian Ocean, from Kenya and the Red Sea east to Indonesia. Two individuals were sighted in the Persian Gulf in 2008 and off Sri Lanka in 2015.

== Southern waters ==
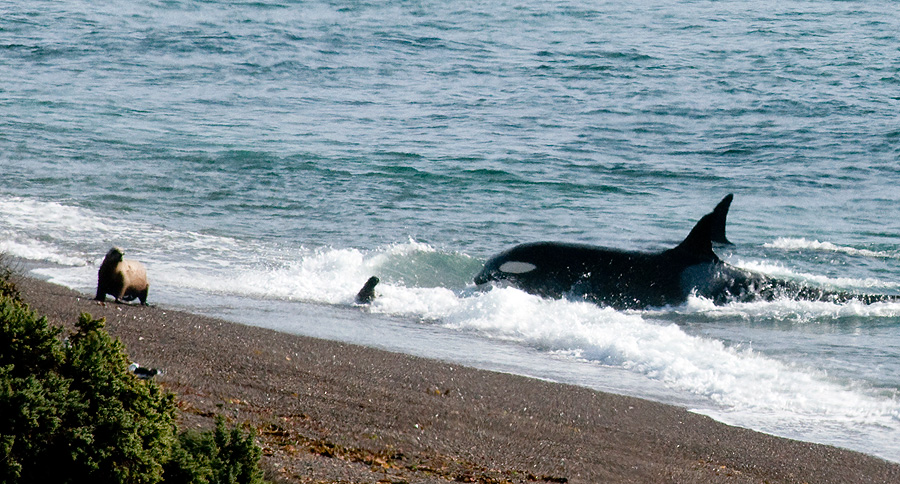
Orca beaching to capture sea lion at Valdes Peninsula

A small population of orcas seasonally visits the northern point of the Valdes Peninsula on the east coast of Argentina and hunt for sea lions and elephant seals on the shore, temporarily stranding themselves. Similar behaviors occur among orcas off the Crozet Islands, which breach to grab elephant seals. These orcas also prey on Patagonian toothfish. 65 individuals have been documented in this area. Off South Africa, a distinctive "flat-tooth" morphotype exists and preys on sharks. A pair of male orcas, Port and Starboard, have become well known for hunting great whites and other sharks off the South African coast.

Orcas occur throughout the waters of Australia, New Zealand and Papua New Guinea. They are sighted year round in New Zealand waters, while off Australia, they are seasonally concentrated off the northwest, in the inshore waters of Ningaloo Reef, and the southwest, at the Bremer region. Genetic evidence shows that the orcas of New Zealand and northwest and southwest Australia form three distinct populations. New Zealand orcas mainly prey on sharks and rays.

=== Antarctic ===
Around 25,000 orcas are estimated around the Antarctic, and four types have been documented. Two dwarf species, named Orcinus nanus and Orcinus glacialis, were described during the 1980s by Soviet researchers, but most cetacean researchers are skeptical about their status, and linking these directly to the types described below is difficult.

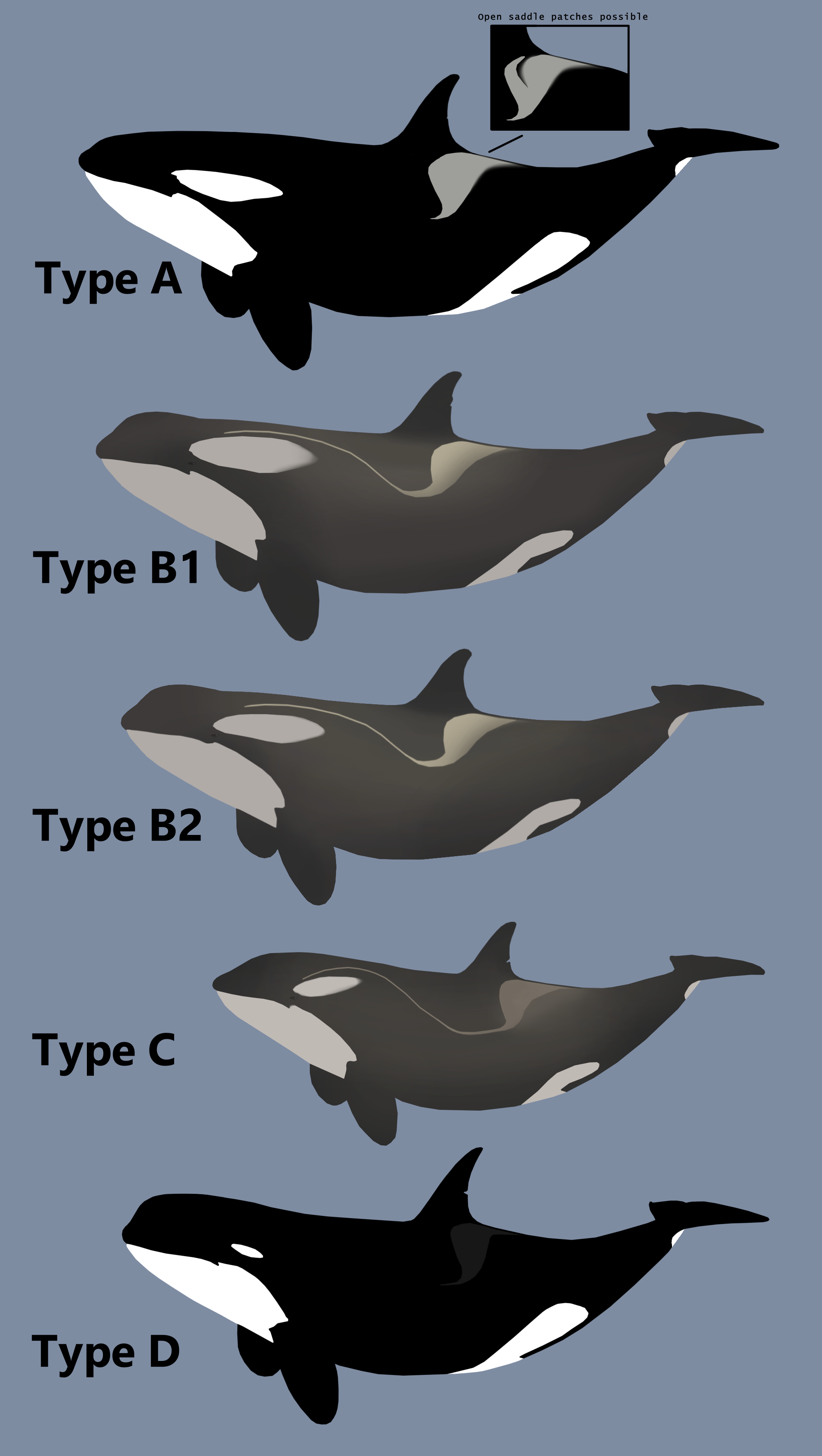
Some examples of variations in orcas

- Type A or Antarctic orcas look like a "typical" orca, a large, black-and-white form with a medium-sized white eye patch, living in open water and feeding mostly on minke whales.
- Type B1 or pack ice orcas are smaller than type A. It has a large white eye patch. Most of the dark parts of its body are medium grey instead of black, although it has a dark grey patch called a "dorsal cape" stretching back from its forehead to just behind its dorsal fin. The white areas are stained slightly yellow. It feeds mostly on seals. Type B1 orca are abundant between Adelaide Island and the mainland Antarctic peninsula.
- Type B2 or Gerlache orcas are morphologically similar to Type B1, but smaller. This ecotype has been recorded feeding on penguins and seals, and is often found in the Gerlache Strait.
- Type C or Ross Sea orcas are the smallest ecotype and live in larger groups than the others. Its eye patch is distinctively slanted forwards, rather than parallel to the body axis. Like type B, it is primarily white and medium grey, with a dark grey dorsal cape and yellow-tinged patches. Its only observed prey is the Antarctic cod.
- Type D or Sub-Antarctic orcas were first identified based on photographs of a 1955 mass stranding in New Zealand and six at-sea sightings since 2004. The first video record of this type was made in 2014 between the Kerguelen and Crozet Islands, and again in 2017 off the coast of Cape Horn, Chile. It is recognizable by its small white eye patch, narrower and shorter than usual dorsal fin, bulbous head (similar to a pilot whale), and smaller teeth. Its geographic range appears to be circumglobal in sub-Antarctic waters between latitudes 40°S and 60°S. Although its diet is not determined, it likely includes fish, as determined by photographs around longline vessels, where Type D orcas appeared to be preying on Patagonian toothfish.

Types B and C live close to the ice, and diatoms in these waters may be responsible for the yellowish colouring of both types. Mitochondrial DNA sequences support the theory that these are recently diverged separate species. More recently, complete mitochondrial sequencing indicates the types B and C be recognized as distinct species, as should the North Pacific transients, leaving the others as subspecies pending additional data. Advanced methods that sequenced the entire mitochondrial genome revealed systematic differences in DNA between different populations. A 2019 study of Type D orcas also found them to be distinct from other populations and possibly even a unique species.

== Sources ==
- Baird, Robin W. (April 1999). Status of Killer Whales in Canada (PDF) (Report). Committee on the Status of Endangered Wildlife in Canada. Archived from the original (PDF) on November 8, 2011.
- Carwardine, Mark (2001). Killer Whales. London: BBC Worldwide. ISBN 978-0-7894-8266-2.
- Ford, John K. B.; Ellis, Graeme M.; Balcomb, Kenneth C. (2000). Killer Whales (Second ed.). Vancouver, BC: UBC Press. ISBN 978-0-7748-0800-2.
- NMFS (2005). "Conservation Plan for Southern Resident Killer Whales (Orcinus orca)" (PDF). Seattle, U.S.: National Marine Fisheries Service (NMFS) Northwest Regional Office. Archived from the original (PDF) on June 26, 2008.
