= Port and Starboard (orcas) =

Unique pair of male orcas

Port
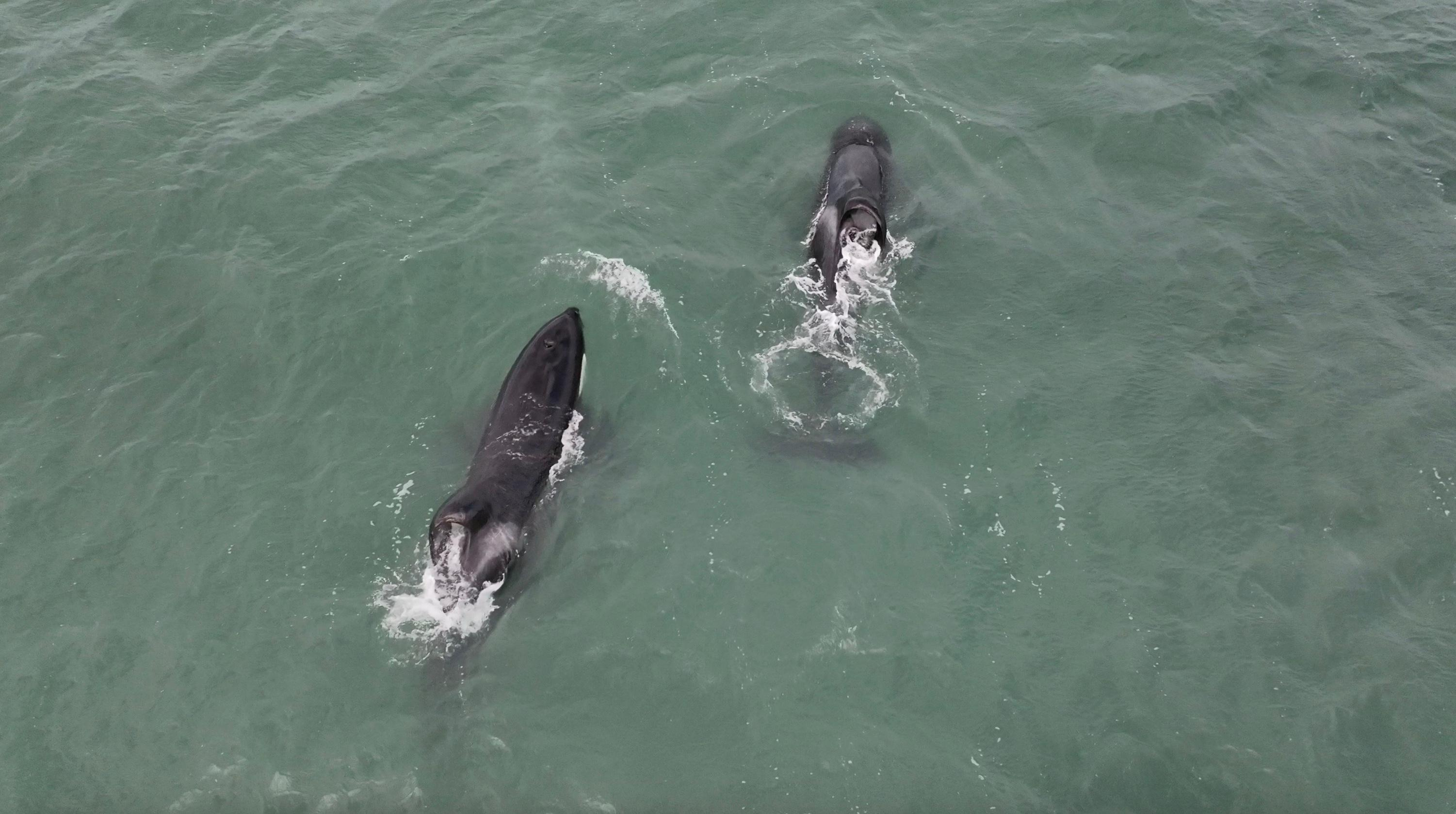
- Photograph of Port (left) and Starboard in Mossel Bay captured via drone in July 2024 by the White Shark Ocean company.
- Species: Orca (Orcinus orca)
- Sex: Male
- Known for: Preying on great white sharks
- Residence: South African coast
- Named after: Left hanging collapsed dorsal fin, port side

Starboard
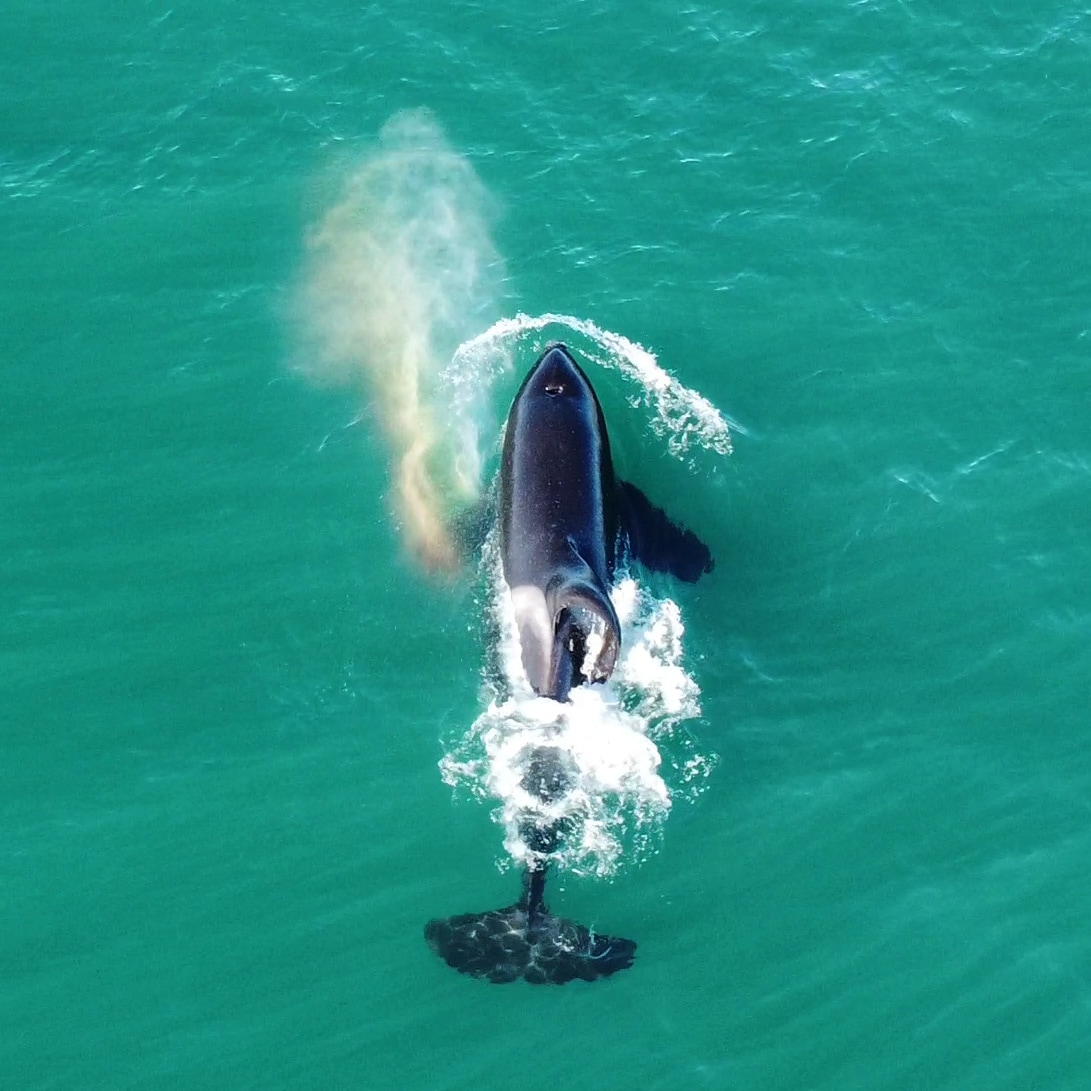
- Photograph of Starboard spouting in August 2022 taken by Esther Jacobs.
- Species: Orca (Orcinus orca)
- Sex: Male
- Known for: Preying on great white sharks
- Residence: South African coast
- Named after: Right hanging collapsed dorsal fin, starboard side

Port and Starboard are a pair of adult male orcas notable for preying on great white sharks off the coast of South Africa. The duo are identified as having rare and distinct collapsed dorsal fins and they are named for the nautical terms, as Port's fin collapses left and Starboard's collapses right. Port and Starboard are part of a distinctive "flat-toothed" ecotype present around South Africa.

== History ==
Port and Starboard were first reported near Lüderitz in 2009 and are often sighted travelling off the coast of Gansbaai, Port Elizabeth, Cape Town, and most notably in False Bay. Prior to 2015, it was believed that orcas entering into the False Bay area preyed only on marine mammals but reports of the pair hunting copper shark and ocean sunfish soon began. However, the duo's most notable prey have been great white sharks. The sharks began washing ashore in 2015 with nothing but their livers removed. Examination of the carcasses reveal that orcas open the sharks between their pectoral fins in order to remove the fatty livers and likely induce tonic immobility to accomplish this safely.

Before 2015, False Bay was well known for its large population of great white sharks but by 2020 sightings were reduced to nearly zero. At least seven great whites believed to have been killed by the duo were found in 2017 including one famous female measuring 16 feet (4.9 m) named Khaleesi that was discovered washed ashore and with her liver removed.

Sometime in 2017, Port and Starboard attempted to kill a female great white shark, but the shark survived. The animal was seen with tooth rake marks on its pectoral fin and teeth marks slashed to its side, indicating that one of them attempted to grab it from above and the wounds were inflicted with significant force.

In August 2019, five deceased great whites were found with their livers removed, believed to have been killed by Port and Starboard. Deceased copper sharks and broadnose sevengill sharks have been discovered with their livers removed in a similar fashion. This is the first time orcas have been documented using this precision feeding technique in this region.

Starboard was first filmed via drone killing a great white in May 2022 around Mossel Bay, alongside four other orcas – this was the first time ever this predation has been filmed. After the attack, white sharks in the area fled for at least seven weeks.

On the 24 February 2023, at least seventeen sevengill sharks were attacked and killed off the coast of Pearly Beach by Port and Starboard in a single day. All of their livers had been precisely removed and consumed in the same manner as their previous attacks on sharks.

In June 2023, Starboard was observed killing a great white shark in Mossel Bay, in the first ever recorded instance of an orca attacking a great white shark alone.

== Effects ==
There are concerns as to the effect the disappearance of great whites in False Bay will have on the local ecosystem, as the sharks serve as the main predator of the local population of Cape fur seals. Scientists believe that the appearance of Port and Starboard, commercial fishing, and climate change are likely the major contributing factors to the mass exodus of the sharks. Additionally, the major tourist attraction of shark cage diving has ceased in recent years without the appearance of great whites, impacting the local economy. The Discovery Channel's Air Jaws film series has also been affected by the disappearance of the famous breaching sharks.

== Behavioral studies ==
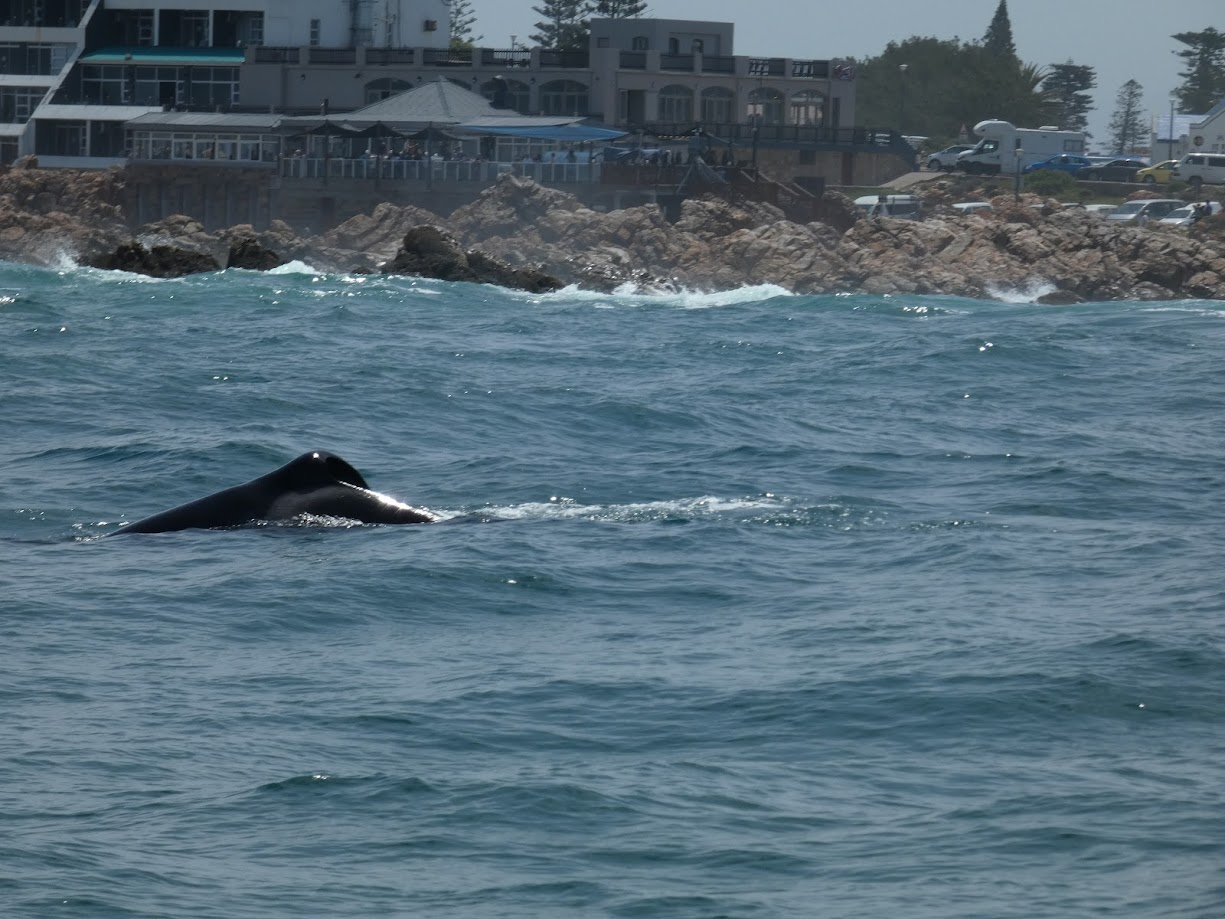
October 2022 photograph of Starboard swimming in Mossel Bay, taken by Esther Jacobs.

Some researchers theorize that Port and Starboard may be older males, as evidenced by their collapsed dorsal fins. The duo may have abandoned their transient lifestyle after finding it more effective and efficient to hunt sharks instead of the faster, more intelligent marine mammals such as dolphins and pinnipeds. Marine biologist Dr. Ingrid Visser has documented that orcas will ram into great white sharks in order to flip them upside down into a catatonic state known as tonic immobility. From there, the orca will take hold of the pectoral fins and violently shake it until the liver is exposed. Similar occurrences have been reported in the Farallon Islands off the coast of San Francisco and once orcas enter the area, the sharks leave for many months. In his research, ecologist Salvador Jorgensen has found that different pods of orcas have entered False Bay previously and this did not cause the sharks to flee in the manner that Port and Starboard have. He believes that the pair behave more like the offshore ecotype of orcas who eat both marine mammals and sharks. Orca ecotypes likely target shark livers because the livers have a high concentration of calories and lipids that are used for the orca's blubber. Orcas will normally hunt sharks in small groups, but Port and Starboard have been observed hunting juvenile great white sharks individually.

== See also ==
- List of individual cetaceans
