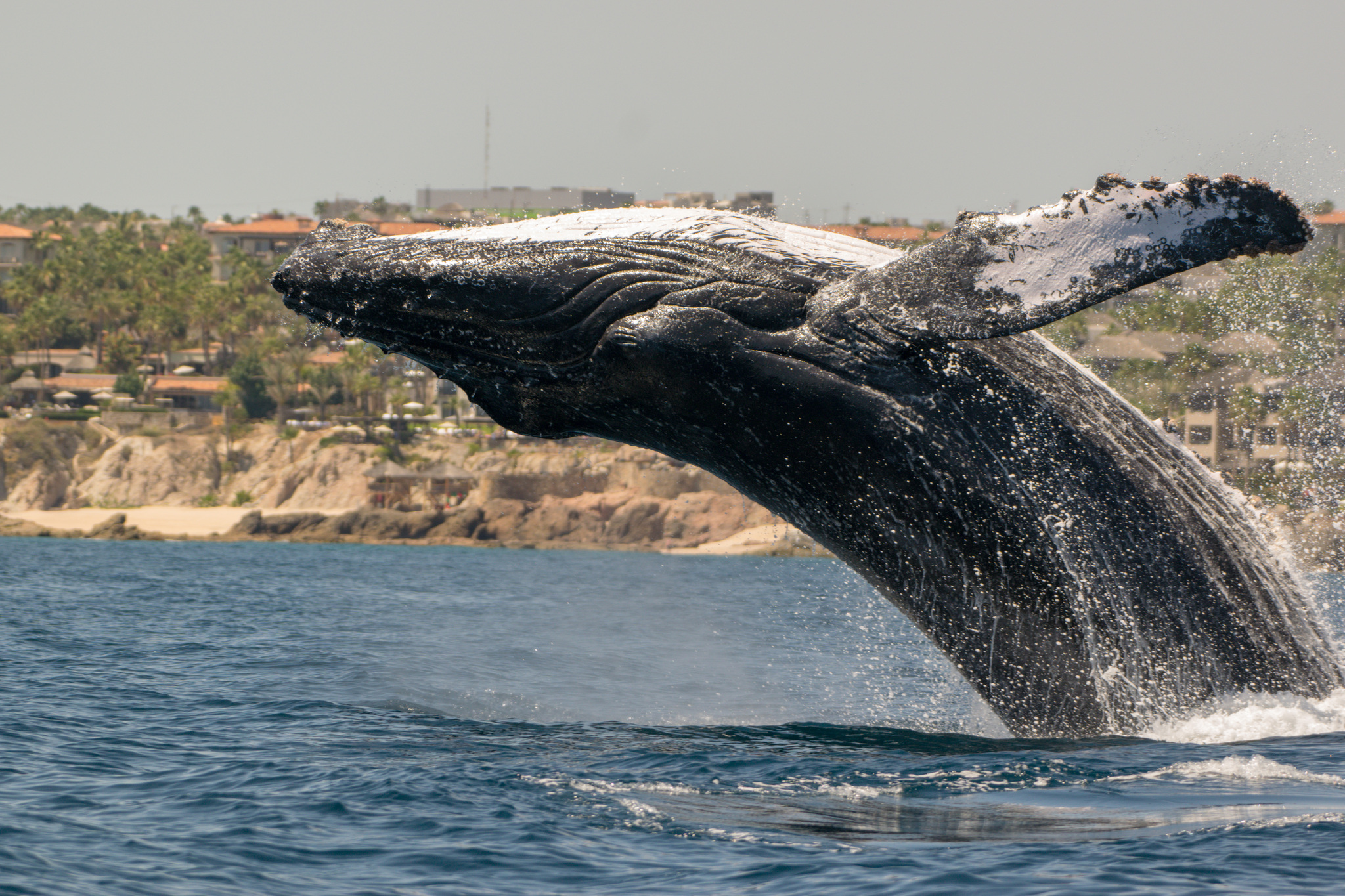
- Humpback whale breaching off Cabo San Lucas, Mexico
- Size compared to an average human

Conservation status
- Least Concern (IUCN 3.1)

- Apparently Secure (NatureServe)
- CITES Appendix I

Scientific classification
- Kingdom: Animalia
- Phylum: Chordata
- Class: Mammalia
- Order: Artiodactyla
- Infraorder: Cetacea
- Family: Balaenopteridae
- Genus: Megaptera; Gray, 1846
- Species: M. novaeangliae

Binomial name
- Megaptera novaeangliae (Borowski, 1781)

Subspecies
- M. n. australis; M. n. kuzira; M. n. novaeangliae
- Humpback whale range (in blue)

Synonyms
- Balaena gibbosa Erxleben, 1777; B. boops Fabricius, 1780; B. nodosa Bonnaterre, 1789; B. longimana Rudolphi, 1832; Megaptera longimana Gray, 1846; Kyphobalaena longimana Van Beneden, 1861; Megaptera versabilis Cope, 1869

= Humpback whale =

Humpback whale Temporal range: 7.5–0 Ma Late Miocene – Recent

Large baleen whale species

The humpback whale (Megaptera novaeangliae) is a species of baleen whale. It is a rorqual (a member of the family Balaenopteridae) and is the only species in the genus Megaptera. Adults range in length from 14–17 m (46–56 ft) and weigh up to 40 metric tons (44 short tons). The humpback has a distinctive body shape, with long pectoral fins and tubercles on its head. It is known for breaching and other distinctive surface behaviors, making it popular with whale watchers. Males produce a complex song that typically lasts from 4 to 33 minutes.

Found in oceans and seas around the world, humpback whales typically migrate between feeding areas towards the poles and breeding areas near the equator. Their diet consists mostly of krill and small fish, and they usually use bubbles to catch prey. They are polygynandrous breeders, with both sexes having multiple partners. Males will follow females and fight off rivals. Mothers give birth to calves in shallower water. Orcas are the main natural predators of humpback whales. The bodies of humpbacks host barnacles and whale lice.

Like other large whales, the humpback was a target for the whaling industry. Humans once hunted the species to the brink of extinction: its population fell to around 5,000 by the 1960s. Numbers have partially recovered to some 135,000 animals worldwide, but entanglement in fishing gear, collisions with ships, and noise pollution continue to affect the species.

== Taxonomy ==
The humpback was first identified as baleine de la Nouvelle Angleterre by Mathurin Jacques Brisson in his Regnum Animale of 1756. In 1781, Georg Heinrich Borowski described the species, converting Brisson's name to its Latin equivalent, Balaena novaeangliae. In 1804, Bernard Germain de Lacépède renamed it B. jubartes. In 1846, John Edward Gray created the genus Megaptera, classifying the humpback as Megaptera longipinna, but in 1932, Remington Kellogg reverted the species name to use Borowski's novaeangliae. The common name is derived from the curving of the whales' backs when diving. The genus name, Megaptera, from the Ancient Greek mega- μεγα ("giant") and ptera πτερα ("wing"), refer to their large front flippers. The species name means "New Englander" and was probably given by Brisson due to regular sightings of humpbacks off the coast of New England.

Humpback whales are rorquals, members of the family Balaenopteridae, which includes the blue, fin, Bryde's, sei, and minke whales. A 2018 genomic analysis estimated that rorquals diverged from other baleen whales in the late Miocene, between 10.5 and 7.5 million years ago. The humpback and fin whales were found to be sister taxa (see the phylogenetic tree below). There is reference to a humpback–blue whale hybrid in the South Pacific, attributed to marine biologist Michael Poole.

- Balaenopteridae
  - B. acutorostrata/bonaerensis (minke whale species complex)
  - - - B. musculus (blue whale)
      - B. borealis (sei whale)
    - - Eschrichtius robustus (gray whale)
      - - B. physalus (fin whale)
        - Megaptera novaeangliae (humpback whale)

Modern humpback whale populations originated in the southern hemisphere around 880,000 years ago and colonized the northern hemisphere 200,000 to 50,000 years ago. A 2014 genetic study suggested that the separate populations in the North Atlantic, North Pacific, and Southern Oceans have had limited gene flow and are distinct enough to be subspecies, with the scientific names of M. n. novaeangliae, M. n. kuzira, and M. n. australis, respectively. A non-migratory population in the Arabian Sea has been isolated for 70,000 years, and may constitute an additional subspecies.

== Characteristics ==
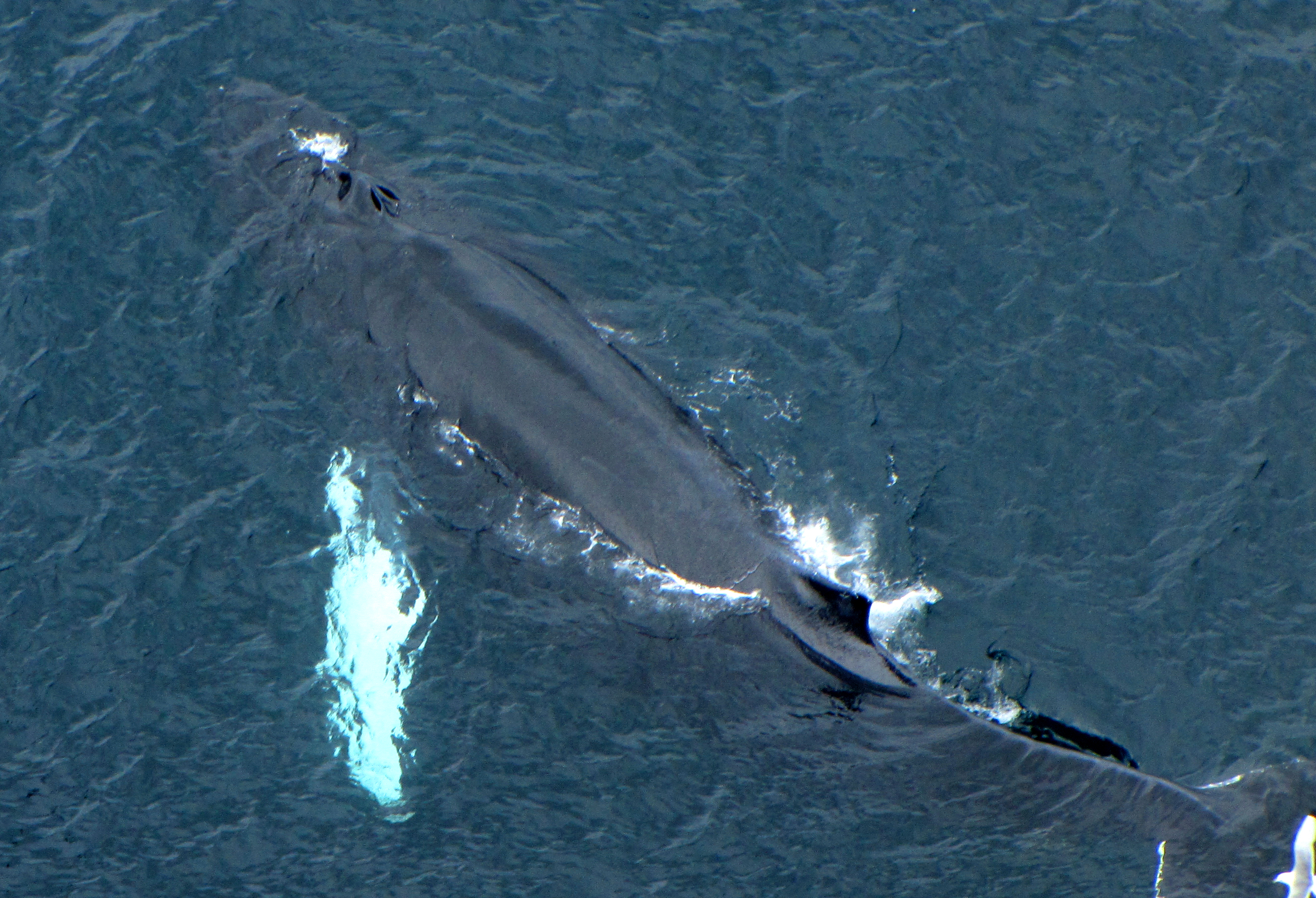
Young whale with blowholes visible

The adult humpback whale is generally 14–15 m (46–49 ft) long, though individuals up to 16–17 m (52–56 ft) long have been recorded. Females are usually 1–1.5 m (3 ft 3 in – 4 ft 11 in) longer than males. The species can reach body masses of 40 metric tons (44 short tons). The longest recorded lengths were 17.4 m (57 ft) for a male and 18.6 m (61 ft) for a female. However, records for humpback whales measuring 17–18 m (56–59 ft) are considered unlikely. Calves are born at around 4.3 m (14 ft) long with a mass of 680 kg (1,500 lb). The species has a bulky body with a thin rostrum and proportionally long flippers, each around one-third of its body length. It has a short dorsal fin that varies from nearly nonexistent to somewhat long and curved. Like other rorquals, the humpback has grooves between the tip of the lower jaw and the navel. The grooves are relatively few in number in this species, ranging from 14 to 35. The upper jaw is lined with baleen plates, which number 540–800 in total and are black in color.

The dorsal or upper side of the animal is generally black; the ventral or underside has various levels of black and white coloration. Whales in the southern hemisphere tend to have more white pigmentation. The flippers can vary from all-white to white only on the undersurface. Some individuals may be all white, notably Migaloo who is a true albino. The varying color patterns and scars on the tail flukes distinguish individual animals. The end of the genital slit of the female is marked by a round feature, known as the hemispherical lobe, which visually distinguishes males and females.

Unique among large whales, humpbacks have bumps or tubercles on the head and front edge of the flippers; the tail fluke has a jagged trailing edge. The tubercles on the head are 5–10 cm (2.0–3.9 in) thick at the base and protrude up to 6.5 cm (2.6 in). They are mostly hollow in the center, often containing at least one fragile hair that erupts 1–3 cm (0.39–1.18 in) from the skin and is 0.1 mm (0.0039 in) thick. The tubercles develop early in gestation and may have a sensory function, as they are rich in nerves. Sensory nerve cells in the skin are adapted to withstand the high water pressure of diving.

In one study, a humpback whale brain measured 22.4 cm (8.8 in) long and 18 cm (7.1 in) wide at the tips of the temporal lobes, and weighed around 4.6 kg (10 lb). The humpback's brain has a complexity similar to that of the brains of smaller whales and dolphins. Studies on the brains of humpback whales revealed spindle cells, which, in humans, control theory of mind. The structure of the eye indicates that eyesight is relatively poor, being only able to see silhouettes over long distances and finer details relatively close. Computer models of the middle ear suggest that the humpback can hear at frequencies between 15 Hz and 3 kHz "when stimulated at the tympanic membrane", and between 200 Hz and 9 kHz "if stimulated at the thinner region of the tympanic bone adjacent to the tympanic membrane". These ranges are consistent with their vocalization ranges. As in all cetaceans, the respiratory tract of the humpback whale is connected to the blowholes and not to the mouth, although the species appears to be able to unlock the epiglottis and larynx and move them towards the oral cavity, allowing humpbacks to blow bubbles from their mouths. The vocal folds of the humpback are more horizontally positioned than those of land mammals which allows them to produce underwater calls. These calls are amplified by a laryngeal sac.

== Behavior and ecology ==
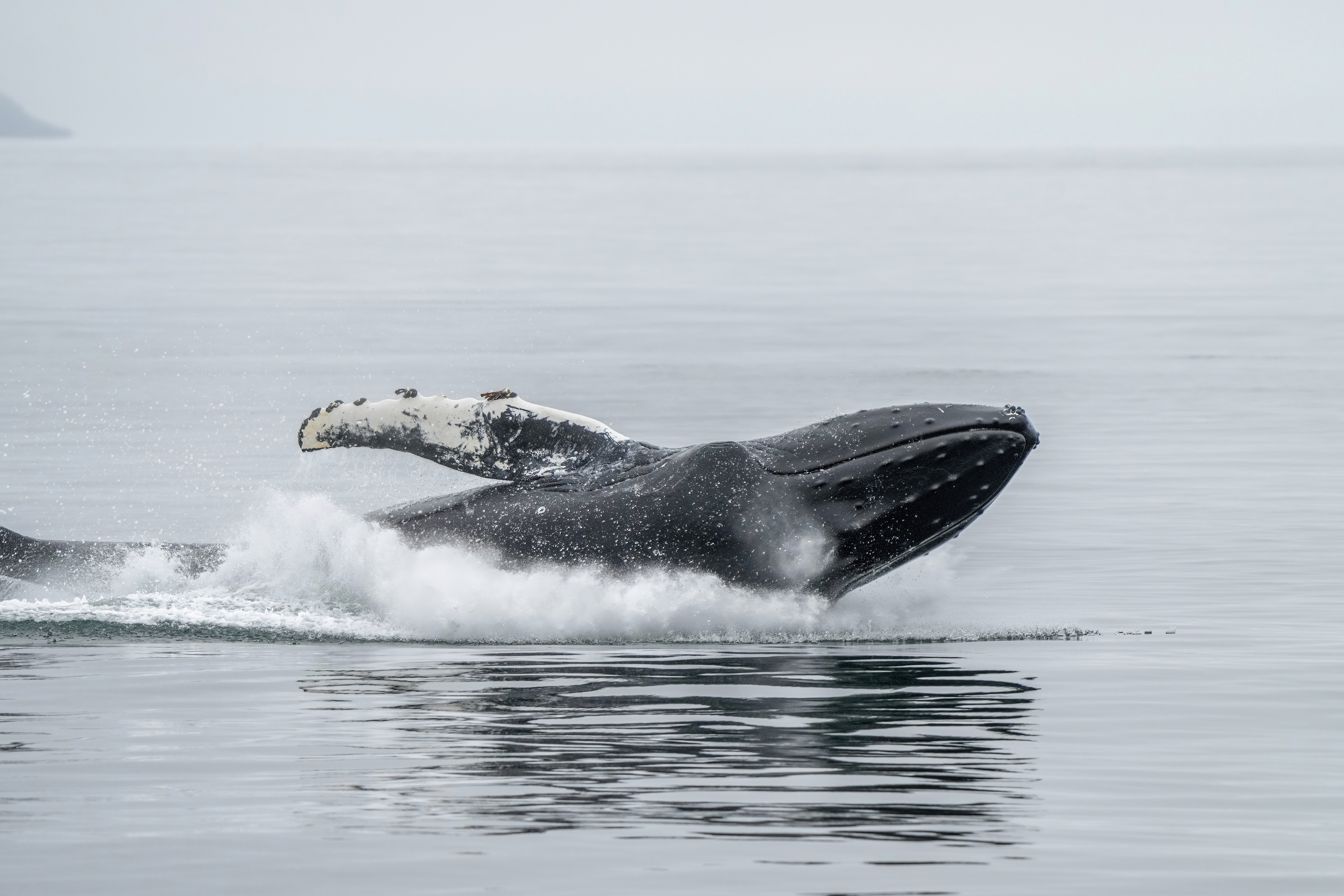
breaching

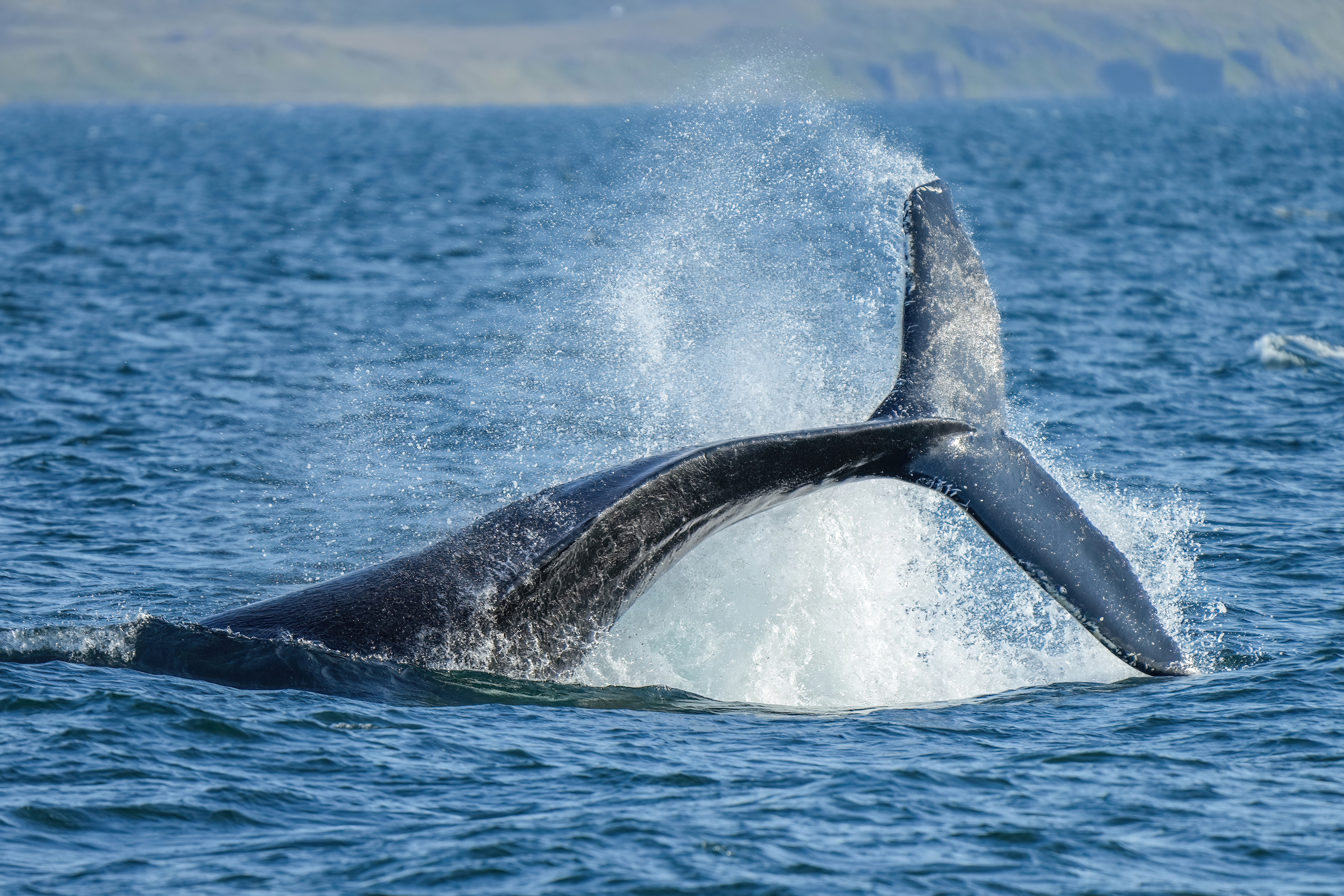
lobtailing

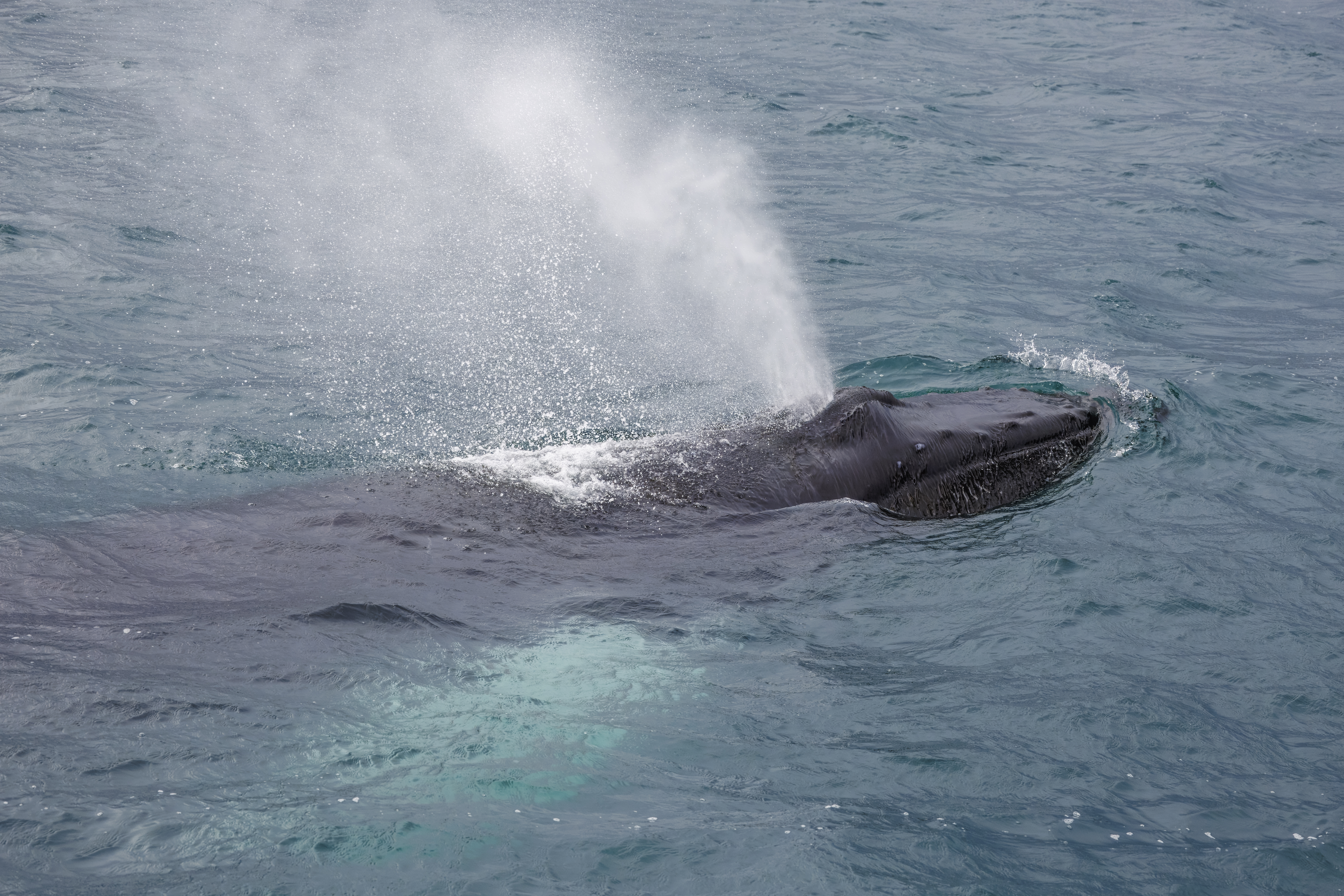
Blowing as it surfaces

Humpback whale groups, aside from mothers and calves, typically stay together for days or weeks at the most. They are normally sighted in small groups, though large aggregations form during feeding and among males competing for females. Humpbacks may interact with other cetacean species, such as right whales, fin whales, and bottlenose dolphins. Humpbacks are highly active at the surface, performing aerial behaviors such as breaching, surface slapping with the tail fluke (lobtailing) and flippers, and peduncle throws, which involve the tail crashing sideways on the surface. These may be forms of play and communication, and may help to remove parasites. The species is a slower swimmer than other rorquals, cruising at 7.9–15.1 km/h (4.9–9.4 mph). When threatened, a humpback may speed up to 27 km/h (17 mph). Their proportionally long pectoral fins give them great propulsion and allow them to swim in any direction, independently of the movements of the tail. Humpbacks are able to flap and rotate their flippers in a manner similar to California sea lions.

Humpbacks rest at the surface with their bodies lying horizontally. They frequent shallow seamounts, commonly exploring depths of up to 80 meters (260 ft) and occasionally diving as deep as 616 meters (2,021 ft). These deeper descents are believed to be for navigational guidance, communication with fellow humpback whales, and facilitation of feeding activities. Dives typically do not exceed five minutes during the summer but are normally 15–20 minutes during the winter. As it dives, a humpback typically raises its tail fluke, exposing the underside. Humpbacks have been observed to produce oral "bubble clouds" when near another individual, possibly in the context of "aggression, mate attraction, or play". Humpbacks may also use bubble clouds as "smoke screens" to escape from predators.

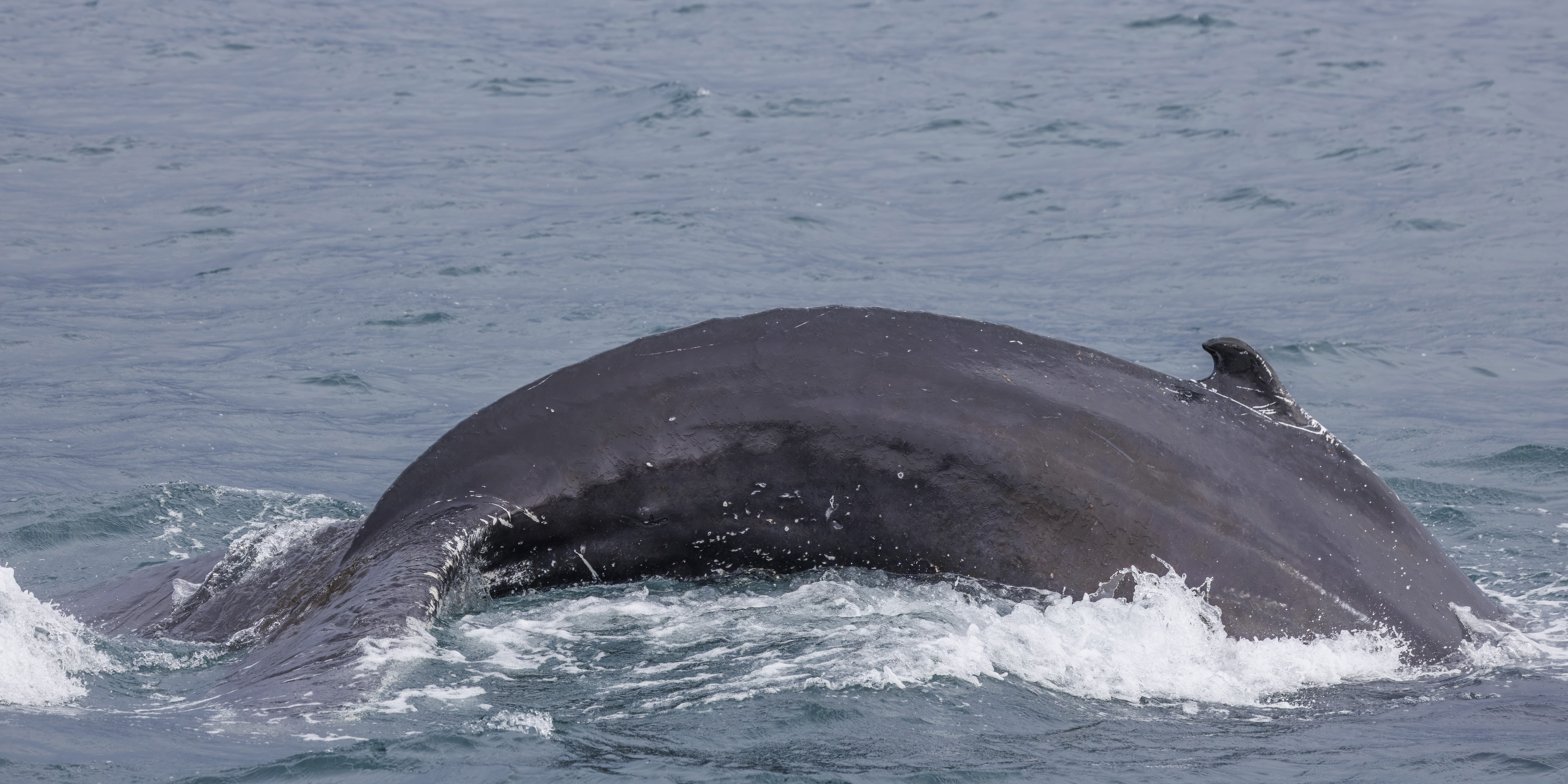
adult female diving in Iceland

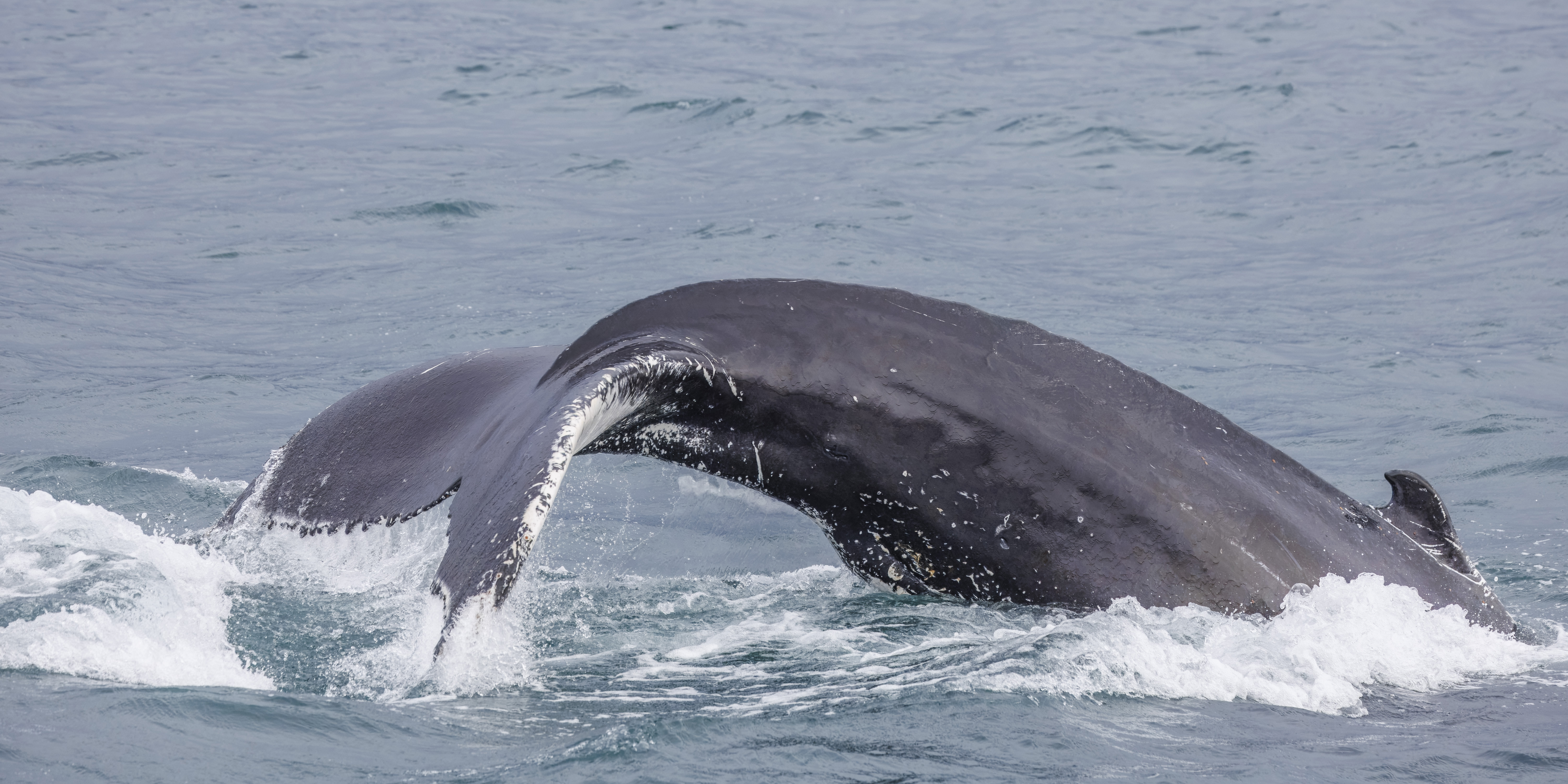

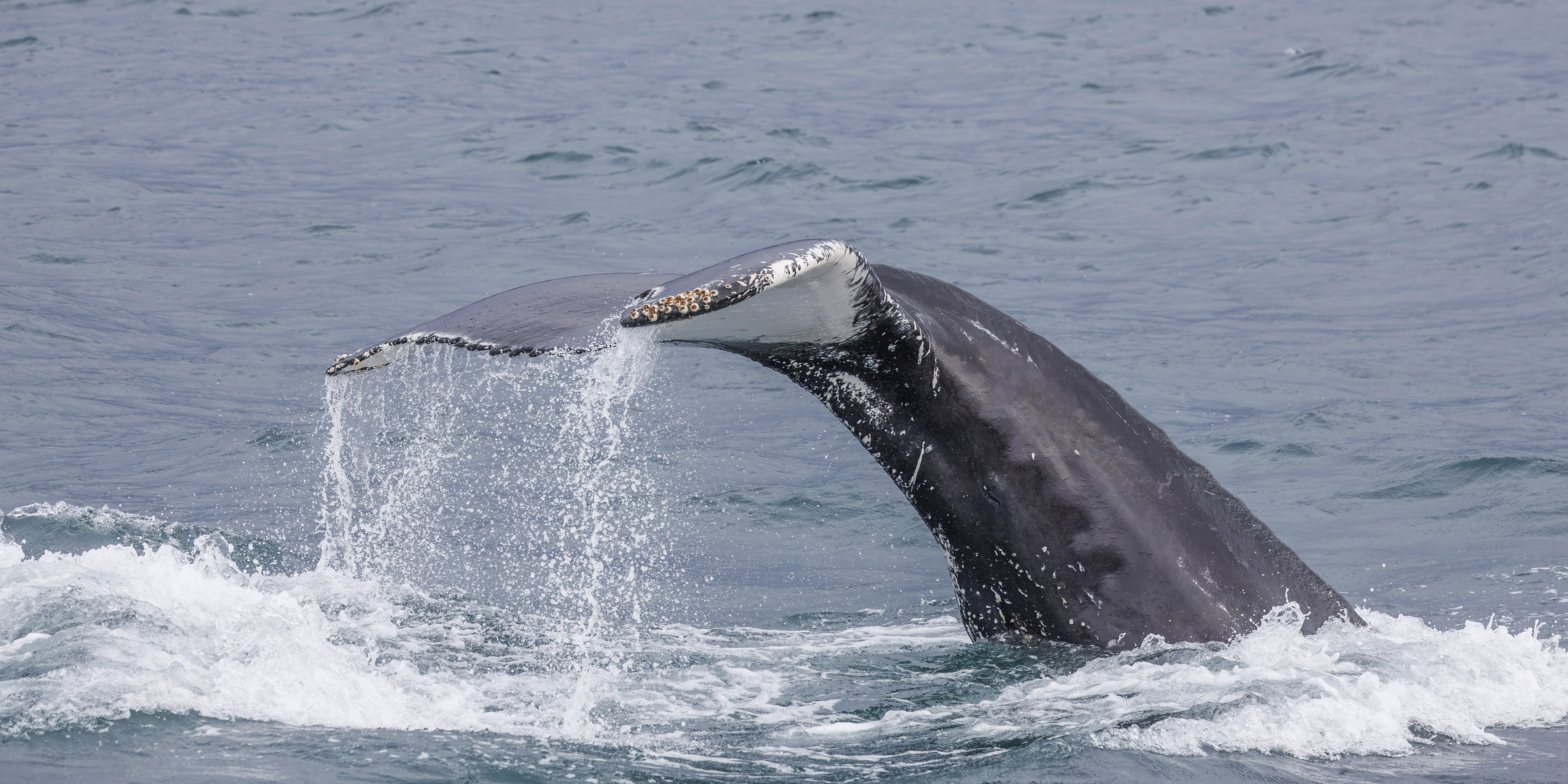

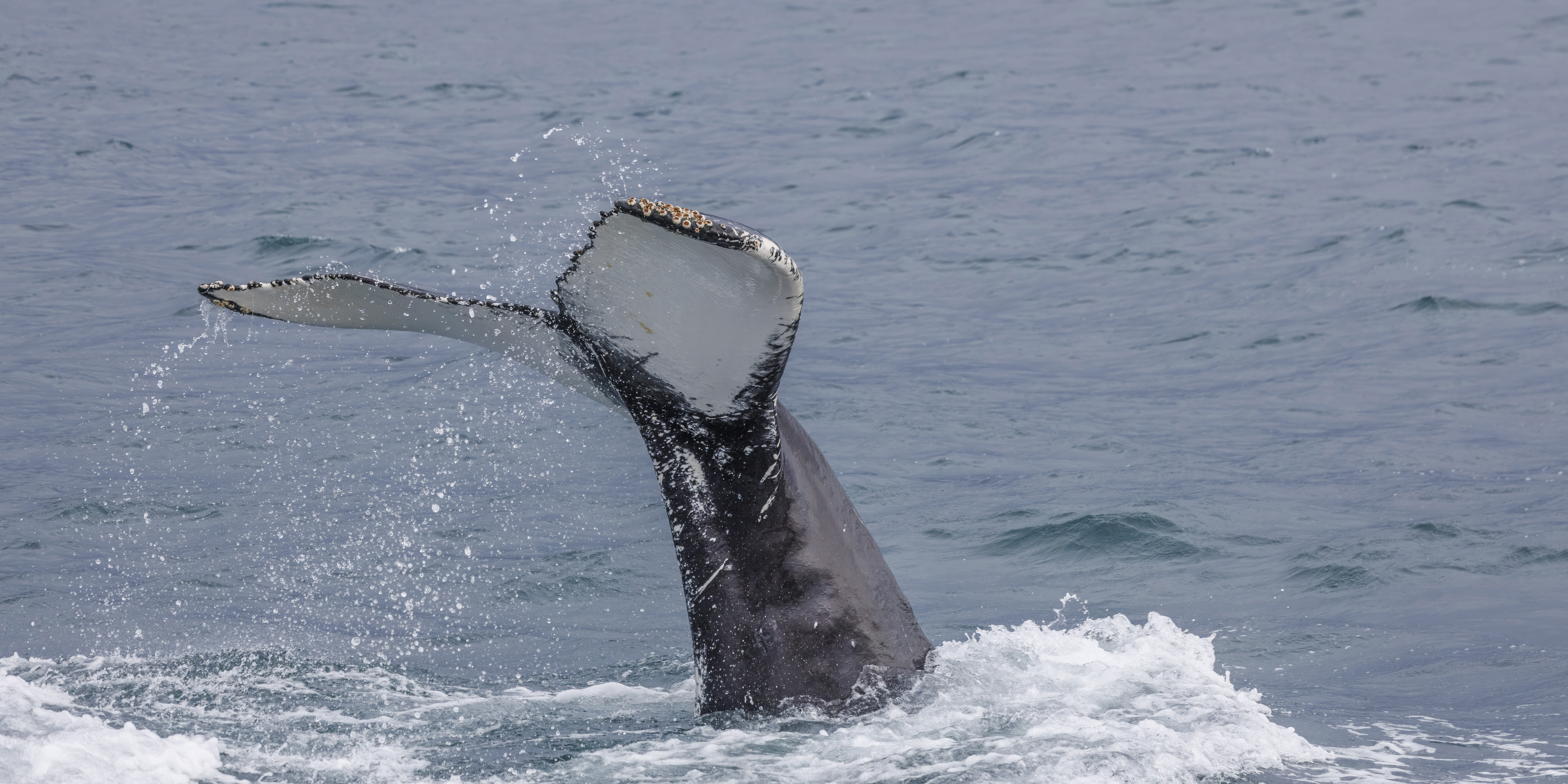

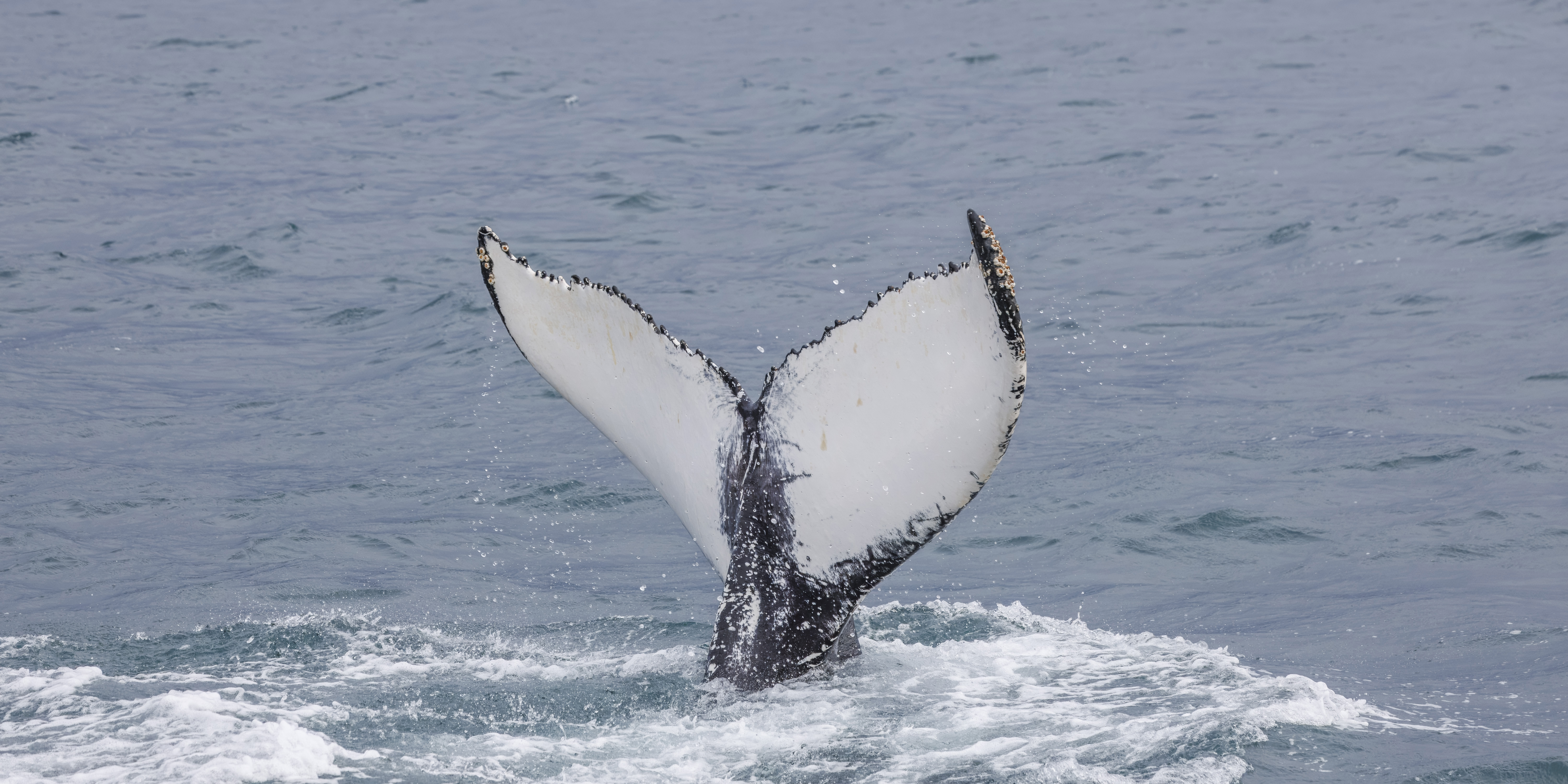

=== Feeding ===
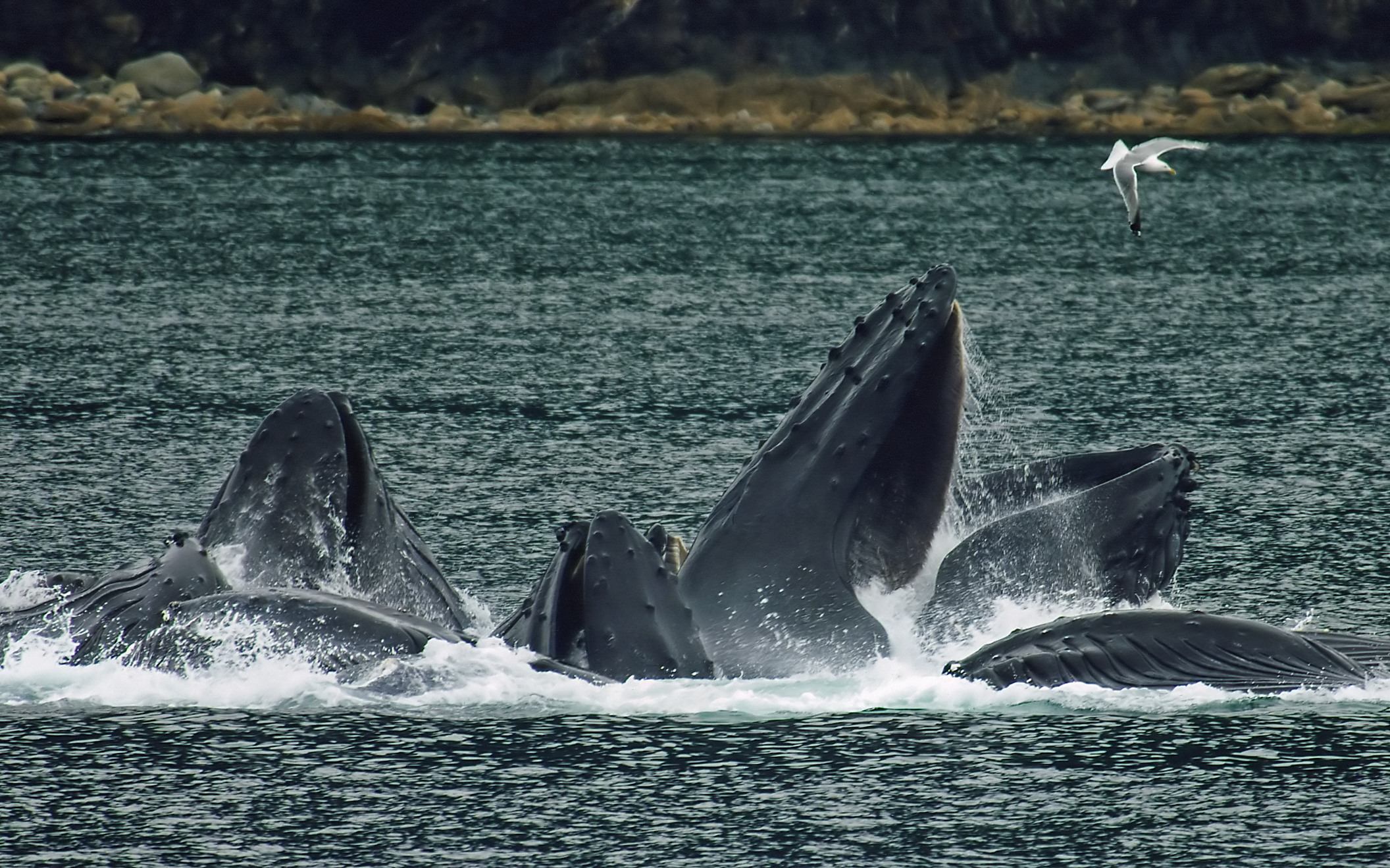
A group of whales bubble-net fishing near Juneau, Alaska

Video of bubble net feeding in Alaska.

Humpback whales feed from spring to fall. They are generalist feeders; their main food items are krill, copepods, other plankton, and small schooling fish. The most common krill species eaten in the southern hemisphere is the Antarctic krill. Farther north, the northern krill and various species of Euphausia and Thysanoessa are consumed. Fish prey include herring, capelin, sand lances, and Atlantic mackerel. Like other rorquals, humpbacks are "gulp feeders", swallowing prey in bulk, while right whales and bowhead whales are skimmers, and the whale increases its mouth gape by expanding the grooves. Water is pushed out through the baleen.

In the southern hemisphere, humpbacks have been recorded foraging in large, compact gatherings numbering up to 200 individuals. A study undertaken in May 2009 found a super-aggregation of krill in Wilhelmina Bay, on the west side of the Antarctic Peninsula, with a large number of humpback whales feeding on the krill. Researchers counted a density of 5.1 whales per square kilometer. Smaller and less dense aggregations of krill and whales were also found in Andvord Bay to the south. Krill and humpback whales are abundant in late autumn along the western Antarctic Peninsula, particularly in Wilhelmina Bay, where the whales seem to eat as much as possible in preparation for the winter.

Humpbacks typically hunt their prey with bubble nets, which is considered to be a form of tool use. Bubble-net feeding allows whales to consume more food per mouthful while using less energy; it is particularly useful for low-density prey patches. A group swims in a shrinking circle while blowing air from their blowholes, capturing prey above in a cylinder of bubbles. They may dive up to 20 m (70 ft) while performing this technique. Bubble-netting comes in two main forms: upward spirals and double loops. Upward spirals involve the whales blowing air from their blowholes continuously as they circle towards the surface, creating a spiral of bubbles. Double loops consist of a deep, long loop of bubbles that herds the prey, followed by slapping the surface and then a smaller loop of bubbles that precedes the final capture. Combinations of spiraling and looping have been recorded. After the humpbacks create the "nets", the whales swim into them with their mouths gaping and ready to swallow. Bubble-net feeding has also been observed in solitary humpbacks.

Using network-based diffusion analysis, one study argued that whales learned lobtailing from other whales in their group over 27 years in response to a change in primary prey. The tubercles on the flippers stall the angle of attack, which both maximizes lift and minimizes drag (see tubercle effect). This, along with the shape of the flippers, allows the whales to make the abrupt turns necessary during bubble-feeding.

At Stellwagen Bank off the coast of Massachusetts, humpback whales have been recorded foraging at the seafloor for sand lances. This involves the whales flushing out the fish by brushing their jaws against the bottom.

=== Courtship and reproduction ===
Mating takes place during the winter months, which is when females reach estrus and males reach peak testosterone and sperm levels. Humpback whales are polygynandrous (both sexes have multiple partners). Males frequently trail both lone females and cow–calf pairs. These males are known as "escorts"; the male that is closest to the female is known as the "principal escort", and fights off the other suitors, known as "challengers". Other males, called "secondary escorts", trail farther behind and are not directly involved in the conflict. Agonistic behavior between males consists of tail slashing, ramming, and head-butting. Males have also been observed engaging in copulation with each other.

Females may experience pleasure from bubble stimulation, which is a novel concept among cetaceans. Video taken near Hawaii documents three male humpbacks producing bubbles directly under a female's genitalia twelve separate times. Instead of fleeing, the female seems to accept these bubbles, exhibiting behaviors such as "rolling toward, arching, or slightly lifting and/or moving her tail above the bubble releases". This behaviour has also been documented near the Cook Islands.

Gestation in the species lasts 11.5 months, and females reproduce every two years. Fetuses start out with teeth and develop their baleen during the last months of their gestation. Humpback whale births have rarely been observed by humans. One birth witnessed off Madagascar occurred within four minutes. Mothers typically give birth in mid-winter, usually to a single calf. Before birth, a mother whale will move to shallower water near the coast, which reduces her chances of being harassed by escort males. It is common for the mother to help her newborn calf reach the surface. Young start out with furled dorsal fins, which straighten and stiffen as the calves get older. Calves with furled fins spend more time traveling and surfacing to breathe; calves with straighter fins can hold their breath longer and can rest and circle at the surface more. Older calves are away from their mothers more than younger calves. Calves suckle for up to a year but can eat adult food at six months. Humpbacks are sexually mature at 5–15 years, depending on the population. Physical maturity is assumed to occur at 8–12 years. They may live for over 50 years. The oldest recorded living humpback whale was 95 years old.

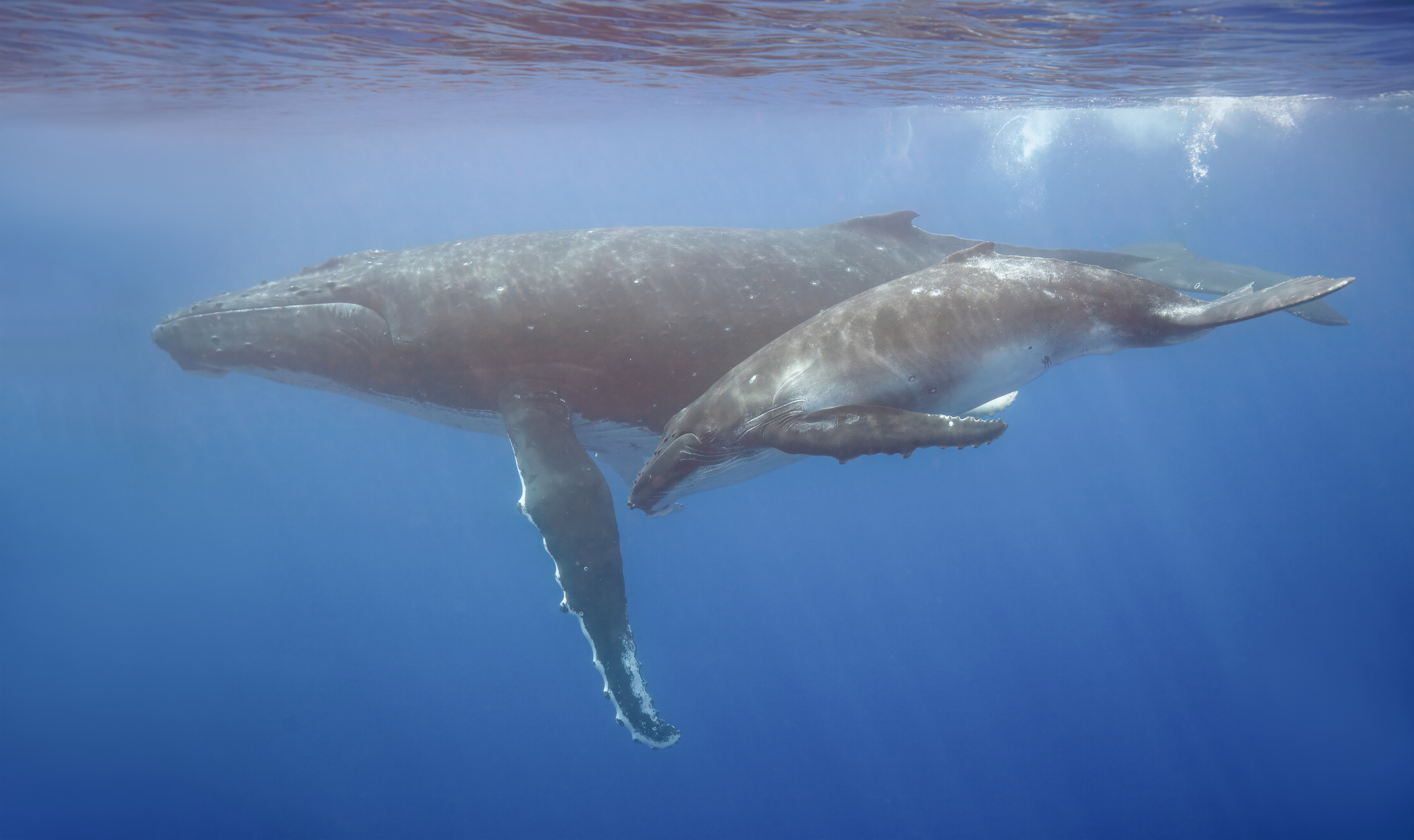
Mother with calf off Moorea, French Polynesia

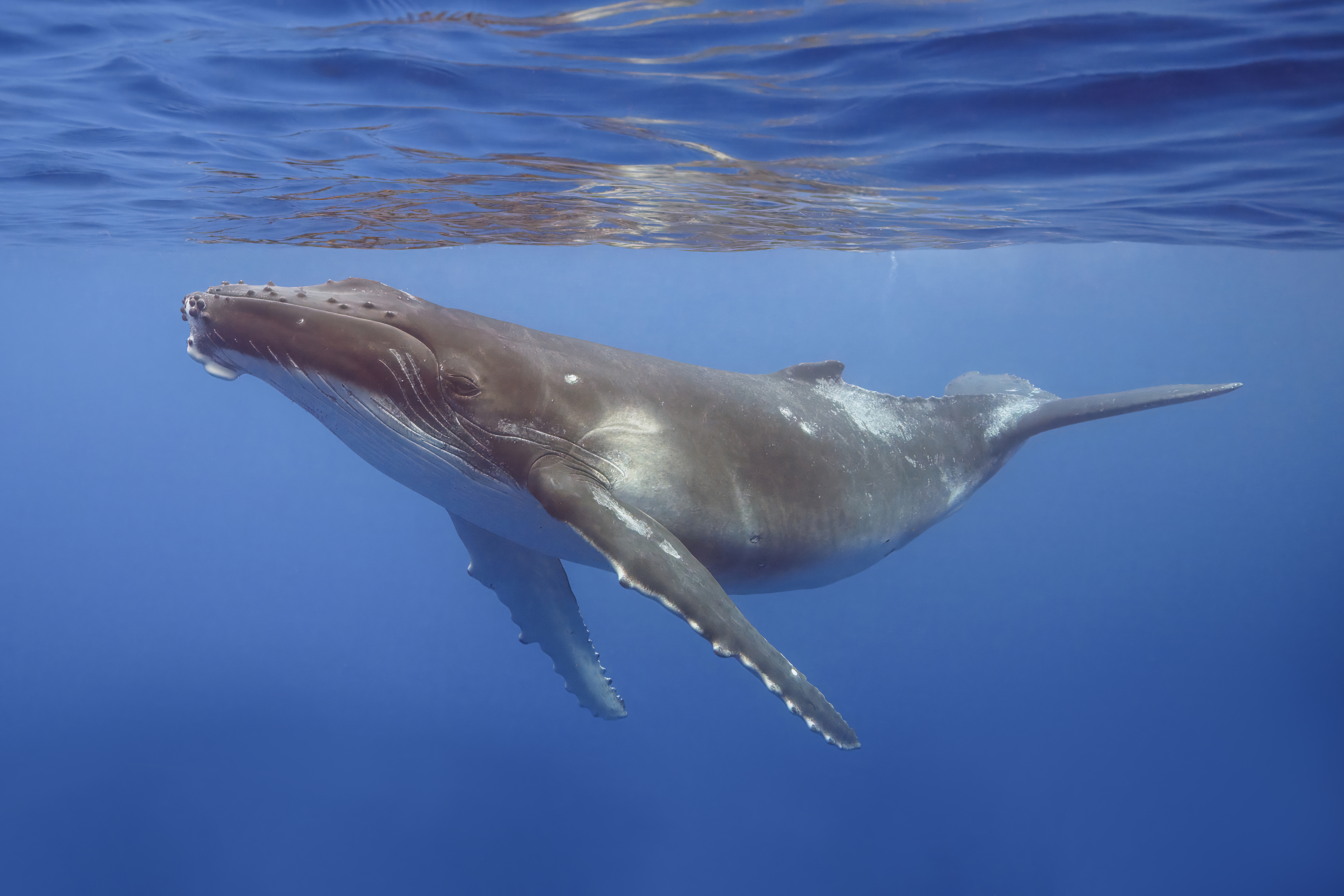
the same calf off Moorea

=== Vocalizations ===
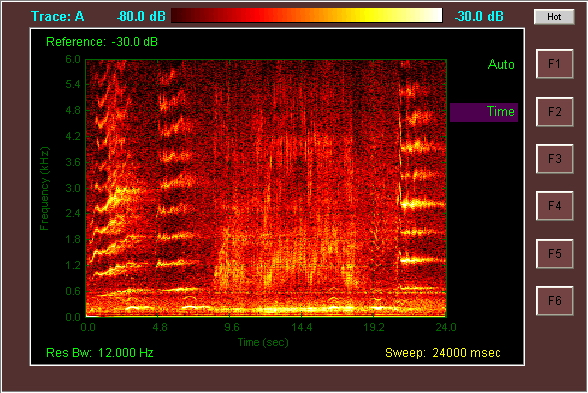
Spectrogram of humpback whale vocalizations: detail is shown for the first 24 seconds of the 37-second recording "Singing Humpbacks".

Humpback whale vocalizations

Male humpback whales produce complex songs during the winter breeding season. These vocals range in frequency between 100 Hz and 4 kHz, with harmonics reaching up to 24 kHz or more, and can travel at least 10 km (6.2 mi). Males may sing for between 4 and 33 minutes, depending on the region. In Hawaii, humpback whales have been recorded vocalizing for as long as seven hours. Songs are divided into "subunits", "units", "subphrases", "phrases", and "themes". A subunit refers to the discontinuities or inflections of a sound, while full units are individual sounds, similar to musical notes. A succession of units creates a subphrase, and a collection of subphrases make up a phrase. Similar-sounding phrases are repeated in a series grouped into themes, and multiple themes create a song. Humpback whale songs appear to follow Zipf's law, similar to human languages.

The function of these songs has been debated, and they may have multiple purposes. There is little evidence to suggest that songs establish dominance among males. However, there have been observations of non-singing males disrupting singers, possibly in aggression. Those who join singers are males who were not previously singing. Females do not appear to approach singers that are alone, but may be drawn to gatherings of singing males, much like a lek mating system. Another possibility is that songs bring in foreign whales to populate breeding grounds. It has also been suggested that humpback whale songs have echolocating properties and may serve to locate other whales. A 2023 study found that as humpback whale numbers have recovered from whaling, singing has become less common.

Whale songs are similar among males in a specific area. Males may alter their songs over time, and others in contact with them copy these changes. Songs have been shown in some cases to spread between neighboring populations throughout successive breeding seasons. In the northern hemisphere, songs change more gradually, while southern hemisphere songs go through cyclical "revolutions".

Humpback whales are reported to make other vocalizations. "Snorts" are quick, low-frequency sounds, commonly heard among animals in groups consisting of a mother–calf pair and one or more male escorts. These likely function to mediate interactions within these groups. "Grumbles" are also low in frequency but last longer and are more often made by groups containing one or more adult males. They appear to signal body size and may serve to establish social status. "Thwops" and "wops" are frequency-modulated vocals that may serve as contact calls both within and between groups. High-pitched "cries", "violins", and modulated "shrieks" are normally heard in groups with two or more males and are associated with competition. Humpback whales produce short, low-frequency "grunts" and short, modulated "barks" when joining new groups.

=== Predation ===
Visible scars indicate that orcas prey upon juvenile humpbacks and even adults. A 2014 study in Western Australia observed that when available in large numbers, young humpbacks can be attacked and sometimes killed by orcas. Mothers and (possibly related) adults escort calves to deter such predation. The suggestion is that when humpbacks suffered near-extinction during the whaling era, orcas turned to other prey but are now resuming their former practice. Evidence also indicates that humpback whales will defend against and mob orcas attacking humpback calves, juveniles, and members of other species, including seals. The humpback's protection of other species may be unintentional, a "spillover" of mobbing behavior intended to protect members of its species. The powerful flippers of humpback whales, often infested with large, sharp Coronula barnacles, are formidable weapons against orcas. When threatened, they will thrash their flippers and tails, keeping the orcas at bay.

Large sharks have also been documented hunting humpback whales. In 2006, an ailing humpback fell prey to a group of tiger sharks near Hawaii. In 2014, a group of 10-20 dusky sharks were observed hunting and presumably killing a humpback whale calf. In 2020, Marine biologists Dines and Gennari et al. published a documented incident of a pair of great white sharks attacking and killing a weakened 7 m (23 ft) humpback whale. A second incident of a great white shark killing a humpback whale was documented off the coast of South Africa. Working alone, the shark attacked a 10-metre (33 ft), emaciated and entangled humpback whale by attacking the whale's tail to cripple and bleed the whale before she managed to drown the whale by biting onto its head and pulling it underwater.

=== Infestations and health threats ===
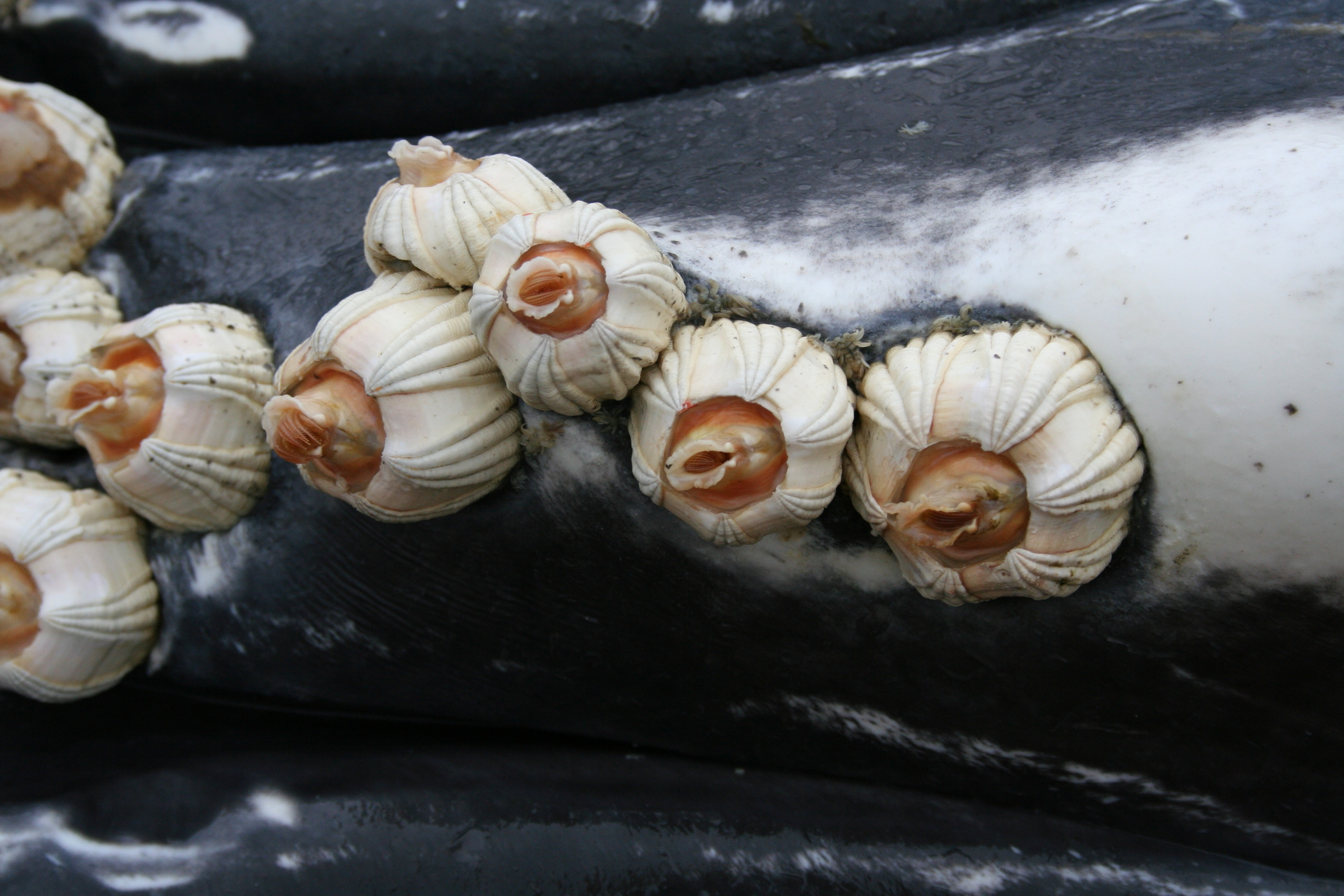
Coronula diadema on a humpback

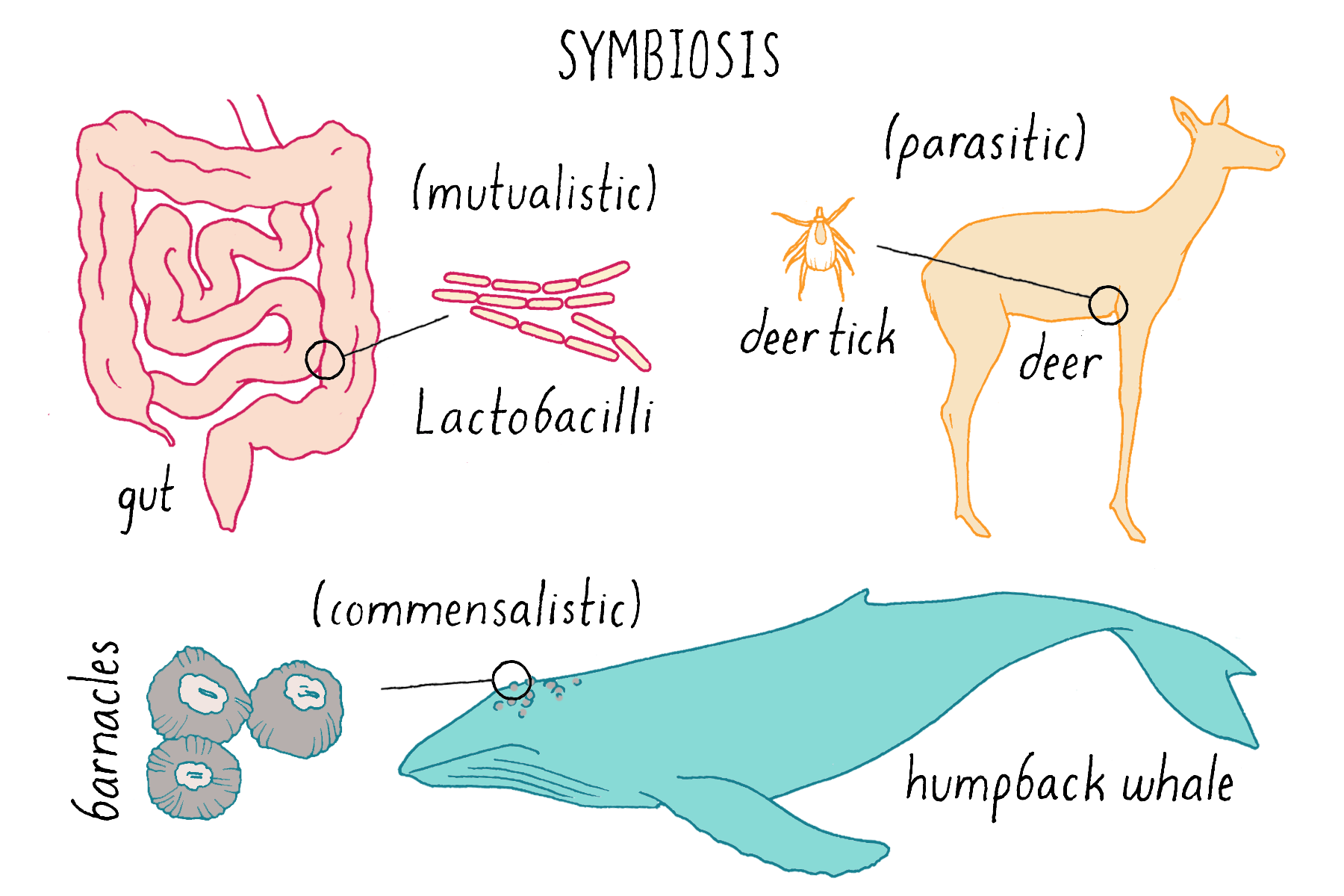
Barnacles that live on humpback whales are considered a commensalistic form of symbiosis, doing no harm to the organism.

Humpback whales often have barnacles living on their skin, the most common being the acorn barnacle species Coronula diadema and Coronula reginae, which in turn are sites for attachment for goose barnacle species like Conchoderma auritum and Conchoderma virgatum. They are most abundant at the lower jaw tip, along the middle ventral groove, near the genital slit, and between the bumps on the flippers. C. reginae digs deep into the skin, while attachments by C. diadema are more superficial. The size of the latter species provides more sites for attachment by other barnacles. Barnacles are considered to be epibionts rather than parasites, as they do not feed on the whales, though they can affect their swimming by increasing drag.

The whale louse species Cyamus boopis is specialized for feeding on humpback whales and is the only species in its family found on them. Internal parasites of humpbacks include protozoans of the genus Entamoeba, tapeworms of the family Diphyllobothriidae, and roundworms of the infraorder Ascaridomorpha.

Saxitoxin, a paralytic shellfish poisoning from contaminated mackerel, has been implicated in humpback whale deaths.

== Range ==
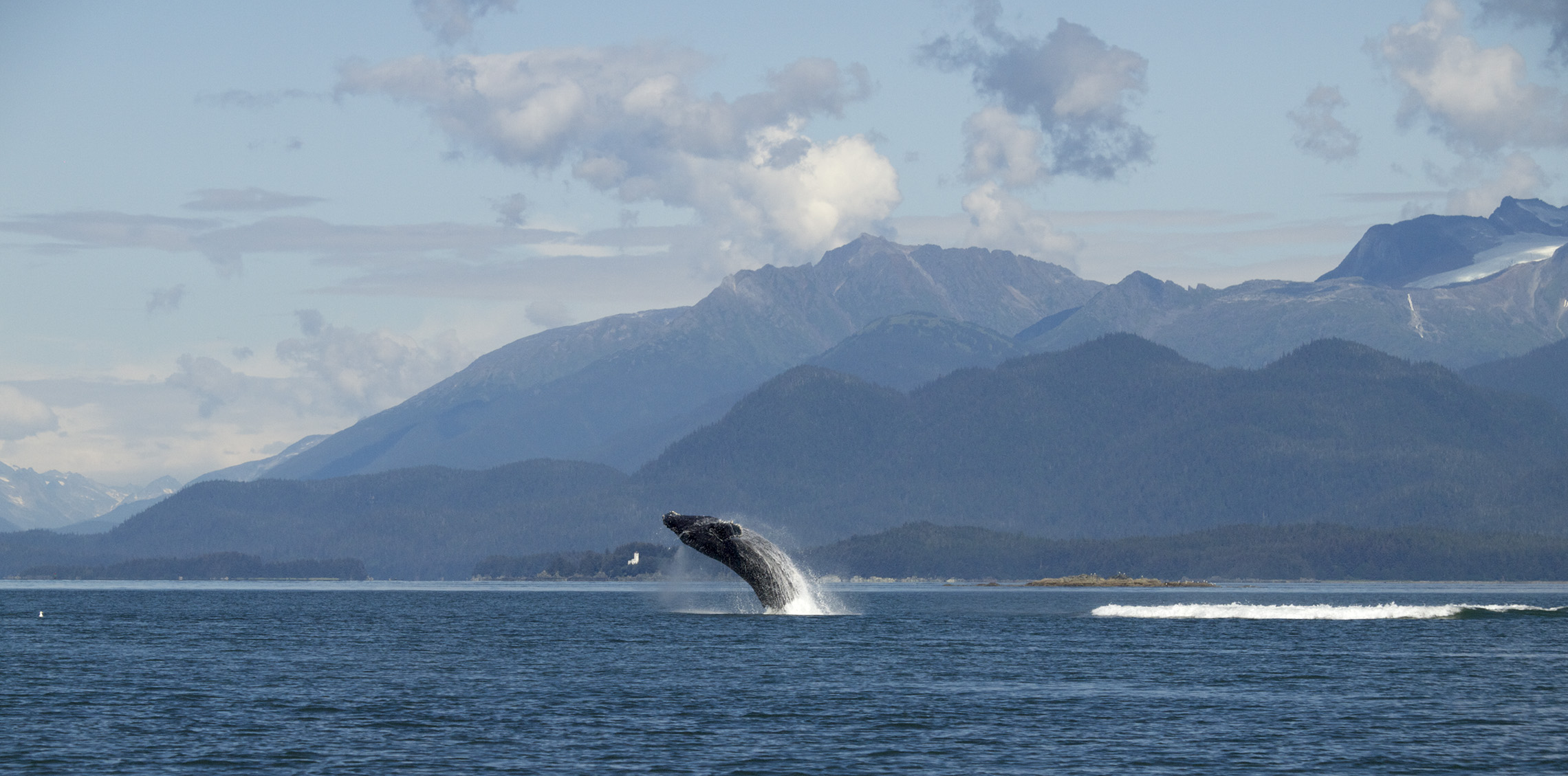
A humpback whale breaching off Alaska in the United States.

Humpback whales are found in marine waters worldwide, except for some areas at the equator and High Arctic and some enclosed seas. The farthest north they have been recorded is at 81°N around northern Franz Josef Land. They are usually coastal and tend to congregate in waters within continental shelves. Their winter breeding grounds are located around the equator; their summer feeding areas are found in colder waters, including near the polar ice caps. Humpbacks go on vast migrations between their feeding and breeding areas, often crossing the open ocean. The species has been recorded traveling up to 8,000 km (5,000 mi) in one direction.

=== Northern Hemisphere ===
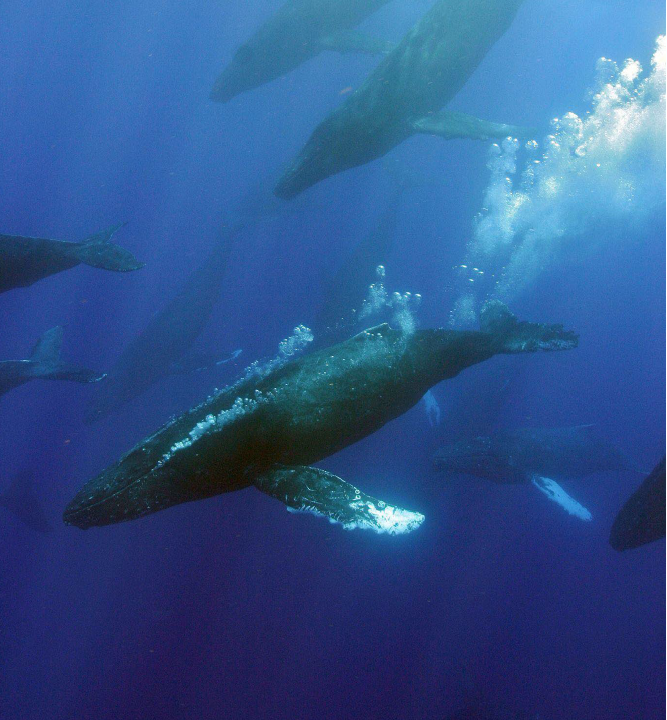
Humpback whales in the Hawaiian Islands Humpback Whale National Marine Sanctuary.

In the North Atlantic, there are two separate wintering populations, one in the West Indies, from Cuba to northern Venezuela, and the other in the Cape Verde Islands and northwest Africa. During summer, West Indies humpbacks congregate off New England, eastern Canada, and western Greenland, while the Cape Verde population gathers around Iceland and Norway. There is some overlap in the summer ranges of these populations, and West Indies humpbacks have been documented feeding farther east. Whale visits into the Gulf of Mexico have been infrequent but have occurred in the gulf historically. They were considered to be uncommon in the Mediterranean Sea, but increased sightings, including re-sightings, indicate that more whales may colonize or recolonize it in the future.

The North Pacific has at least four breeding populations: off Mexico (including Baja California and the Revillagigedos Islands), Central America, the Hawaiian Islands, and both Okinawa and the Philippines. The Mexican population forages from the Aleutian Islands to California. During the summer, Central American humpbacks are found only off Oregon and California. In contrast, Hawaiian humpbacks have a wide feeding range, but most travel to southeast Alaska and northern British Columbia. The wintering grounds of the Okinawa/Philippines population are mainly around the Russian Far East. There is some evidence for a fifth population somewhere in the northwestern Pacific. These whales are recorded to feed off the Aleutians, with a breeding area somewhere south of the Bonin Islands.

An isolated, non-migratory population feeds and breeds in the northern Indian Ocean, mainly in the Arabian Sea around Oman. This population has also been recorded in the Gulf of Aden, the Persian Gulf, and off the coasts of Pakistan and India.

=== Southern Hemisphere ===
Aerial view of three humpback whales (Megaptera novaeangliae) near Cape Solander, New South Wales, Australia

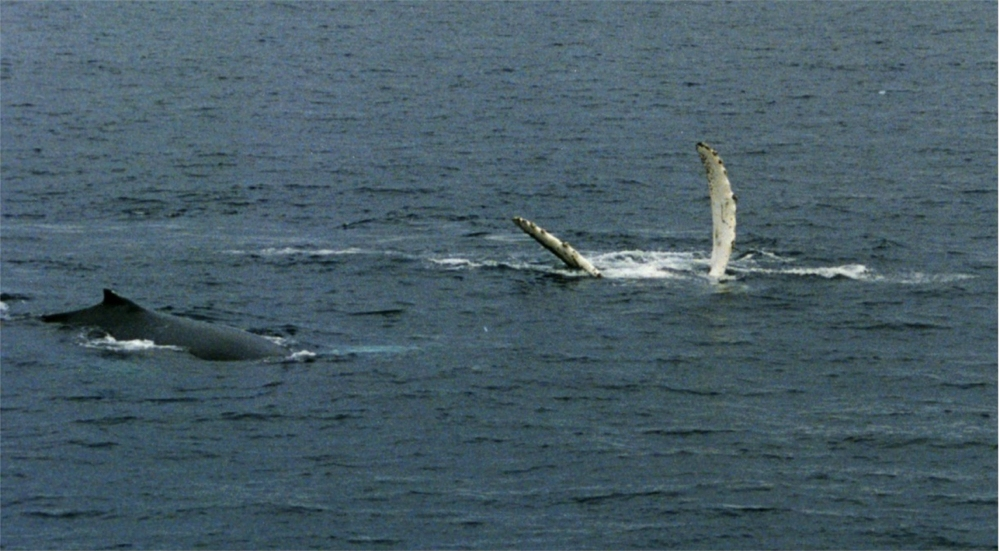
Humpback on its back in Antarctica

In the Southern Hemisphere, humpback whales are divided into seven breeding stocks, some of which are further divided into sub-structures. These include the southwestern Atlantic (stock A), the southeastern Atlantic (stock B), the southwestern Indian Ocean (stock C), the southeastern Indian Ocean (stock D), the southwestern Pacific and Oceania (stocks E and F), and the southeastern Pacific (stock G). Stock G breeds in tropical and subtropical waters off the west coast of Central and South America and forages along the west coast of the Antarctic Peninsula, the South Orkney Islands, and to a lesser extent Tierra del Fuego. Stock A winters off Brazil and migrates to summer grounds around South Georgia and the South Sandwich Islands. Some stock A individuals have also been recorded off the western Antarctic Peninsula, suggesting an increased blurring of the boundaries between the feeding areas of stocks A and G.

Stock B breeds on the west coast of Africa and is further divided into Bl and B2 subpopulations, the former ranging from the Gulf of Guinea to Angola and the latter ranging from Angola to western South Africa. Stock B whales have been recorded foraging in waters to the southwest of the continent, mainly around Bouvet Island. Comparison of songs between those at Cape Lopez and the Abrolhos Archipelago indicate that trans-Atlantic mixings between stock A and stock B whales occur. Stock C whales winter around southeastern Africa and surrounding waters. This stock is further divided into C1, C2, C3, and C4 subpopulations; C1 occurs around Mozambique and eastern South Africa, C2 around the Comoro Islands, C3 off the southern and eastern coast of Madagascar, and C4 around the Mascarene Islands. The feeding range of this population is likely between coordinates 5°W and 60°E and south of 50°S. There may be overlap in the feeding areas of stocks B and C.

Stock D whales breed off the western coast of Australia and forage in the southern region of the Kerguelen Plateau. Stock E is divided into E1, E2, and E3 subpopulations. E1 whales have a breeding range off eastern Australia and Tasmania; their main feeding range is close to Antarctica, mainly between 130°E and 170°W. The Oceania stock is divided into the New Caledonia (E2), Tonga (E3), Cook Islands (F1), and French Polynesia (F2) subpopulations. This stock's feeding grounds mainly range from around the Ross Sea to the Antarctic Peninsula.

== Human relations ==
=== Whaling ===
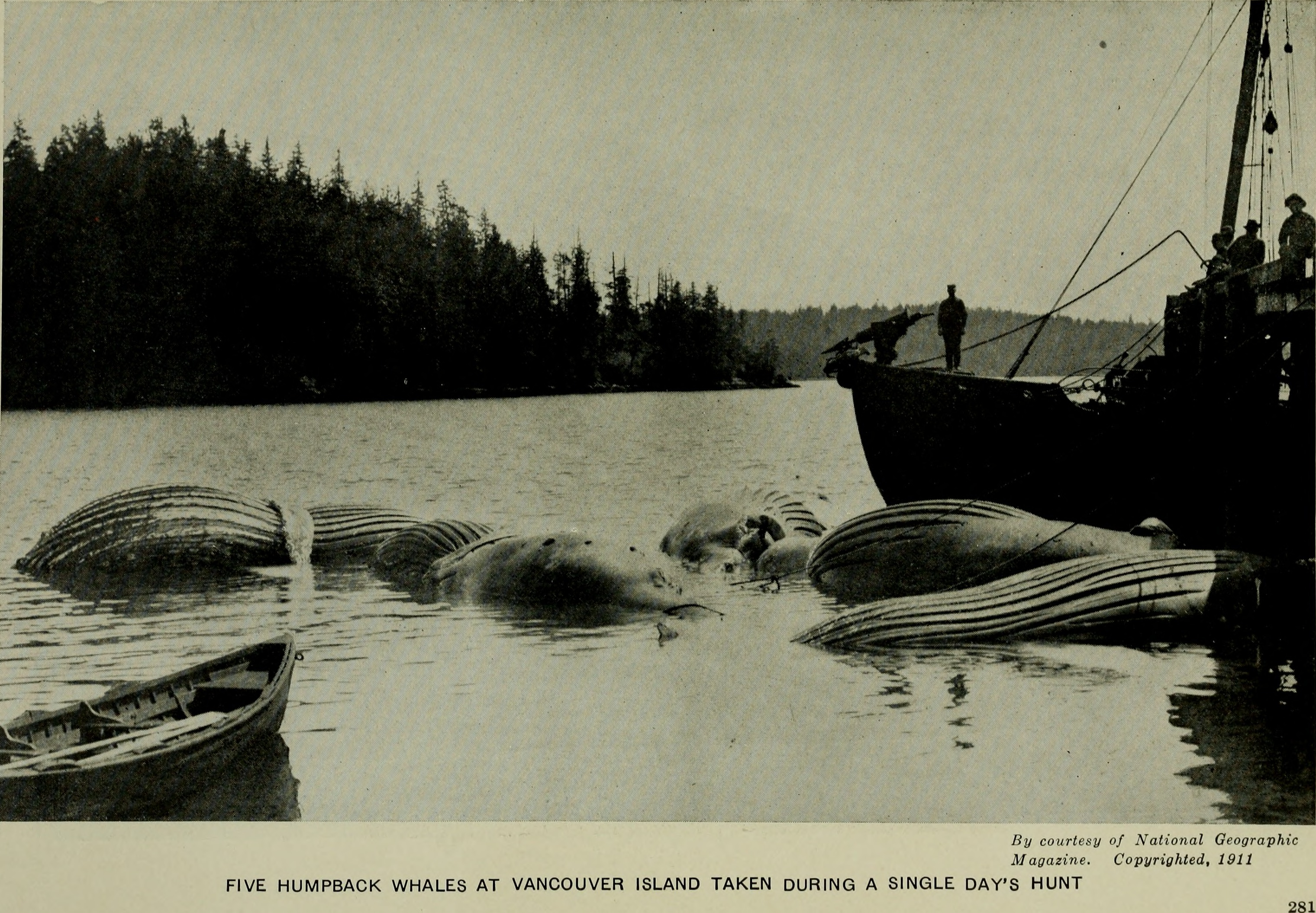
Humpback whales killed by whalers off Vancouver Island, early 20th century

Humpback whales were hunted as early as the late 16th century. They were often the first whale species to be harvested in an area due to their coastal distribution. North Pacific kills alone are estimated at 28,000 during the 20th century. In the same period, over 200,000 humpbacks were taken in the Southern Hemisphere. North Atlantic populations dropped to as low as 700 individuals. In 1946, the International Whaling Commission (IWC) was founded to oversee the industry. They imposed hunting regulations and created hunting seasons. To prevent extinction, the IWC banned commercial humpback whaling in 1966. By then, the global population had been reduced to around 5,000. The Soviet Union deliberately under-recorded its catches: the Soviets reported catching 2,820 between 1947 and 1972, but the true number was over 48,000.

As of 2004, hunting was restricted to a few animals each year off the Caribbean island of Bequia in Saint Vincent and the Grenadines. The take is not believed to threaten the local population. Japan had planned to kill 50 humpbacks in the 2007–08 season under its JARPA II research program. The announcement sparked global protests. After a visit to Tokyo by the IWC chair asking the Japanese for their co-operation in sorting out the differences between pro- and anti-whaling nations on the commission, the Japanese whaling fleet agreed to take no humpback whales during the two years it would take to reach a formal agreement. In 2010, the IWC authorized Greenland's native population to hunt a few humpback whales during the following three years.

=== Whale-watching ===
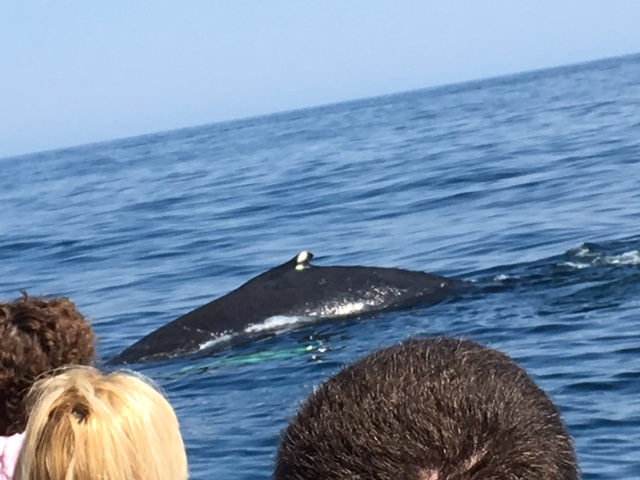
Whale watching off Massachusetts

Much of the growth of commercial whale watching was focused on the humpback whale. The species' highly active surface behaviors and tendency to become accustomed to boats have made them easy to observe, particularly for photographers. In 1975, humpback whale tours were established in New England and Hawaii. This business brings in a revenue of $20 million per year for Hawaii's economy. While Hawaiian tours have tended to be commercial, New England and California whale watching tours have introduced educational components.

Although whale watching can raise awareness of humpback whale conservation, whale watching boats can have negative impacts on humpback whales, including causing stress and disturbing behaviors like feeding, mating and socializing. This is particularly deleterious for mothers with calves. Regulations on whale vessels have included restrictions on how close the vessels can get to the whales.

== Conservation status ==
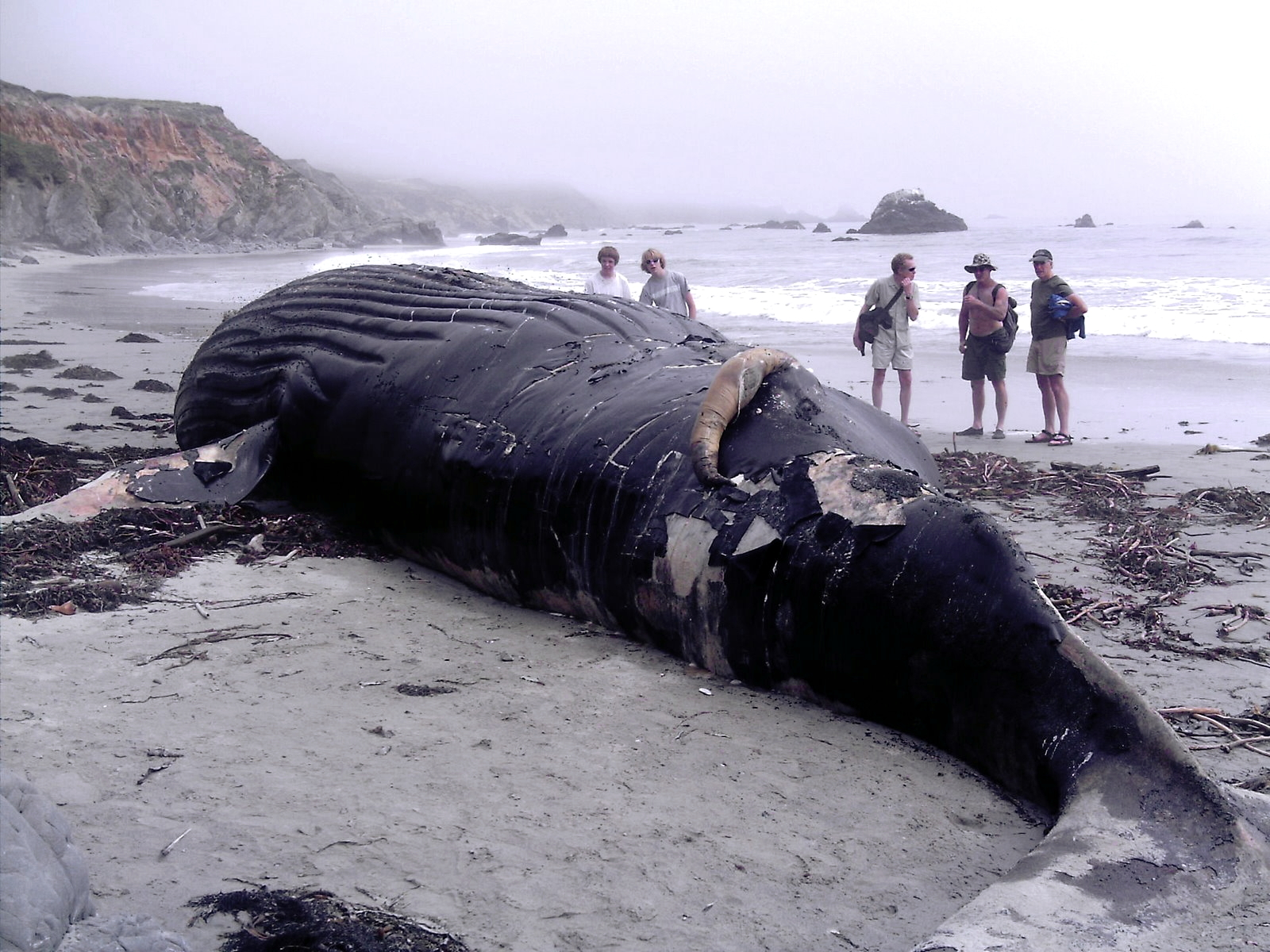
A dead humpback washed up near Big Sur, California

As of 2018, the IUCN Red List lists the humpback whale as of least concern, with a worldwide population of around 135,000 whales, of which around 84,000 are mature individuals, and an increasing population trend. Regional estimates are around 13,000 in the North Atlantic, 21,000 in the North Pacific, and 80,000 in the southern hemisphere. For the isolated population in the Arabian Sea, only around 80 individuals remain, and this population is considered to be endangered. In most areas, humpback whale populations have recovered from historic whaling, particularly in the North Pacific. Such recoveries have led to the downlisting of the species' threatened status in the United States, Canada, and Australia. In Costa Rica, Ballena Marine National Park was established for humpback protection. Similarly, the Hawaiian Islands Humpback Whale National Marine Sanctuary was established in 1992 to protect the then endangered humpback whale and its habitat.

Humpbacks still face man-made threats, including entanglement by fishing gear, vessel collisions, human-caused noise and traffic disturbance, coastal habitat destruction, and climate change. Like other cetaceans, humpbacks can be injured by excessive noise. In the 19th century, two humpback whales were found dead near repeated oceanic sub-bottom blasting sites, with traumatic injuries and fractures in their ears. While oil ingestion is a risk for whales, a 2019 study found that oil did not foul baleen and instead was easily rinsed by flowing water.

NOAA recorded 88 stranded humpback whales between January 2016 and February 2019 along the Atlantic coast of the US. This is more than double the number of whales stranded between 2013 and 2016. Because of the increase in stranded whales, NOAA declared an unusual mortality event in April 2017. Virginia Beach Aquarium's stranding response coordinator, Alexander Costidis, concluded that the two causes of these unusual mortality events were vessel interactions and entanglements.

Around the Strait of Magellan, humpbacks have been the whale species that is most commonly reported to be involved in ship–whale collisions since at least 2013. To decrease the number of collisions, speed limits have been proposed in the area around the Francisco Coloane Marine and Coastal Protected Area.

== See also ==
- List of cetaceans
- List of animals with humps
- Tay Whale – harpooned humpback whale that was dissected by John Struthers
- Humphrey the Whale – individual humpback whale that became famous for entering San Francisco Bay during annual migration in 1985 and 1990
- Timmy (whale) – individual humpback whale that sparked a media frenzy after becoming stranded at the German coast
