= Migaloo =

Albino humpback whale near Australia

Migaloo jumping photographed by Jonas Liebschner onboard Whale Watching Sydney

Part of a Song by Migaloo recorded in 1998

Migaloo ("whitefella" in some Aboriginal languages) is an all-white humpback whale (Megaptera novaeangliae) that was first sighted on June 28, 1991 on the Australian east coast near Byron Bay.

The White Whale Research Centre (WWRC) was founded by Oskar Peterson in 1997 in order to raise awareness of Migaloo the white whale and it has become a collaboration of research from renowned marine experts and citizen scientists who have helped to collect and record sightings over the years. These recorded sightings are available via the website, migaloo.com.au.

His singing was first recorded in 1998, which made scientists believe that Migaloo is a male humpback. After genetic analysis in 2004 by Southern Cross University scientists, it was confirmed that Migaloo is male and possibly born in the mid-to-late 1980s; some scientists believe a likely birth year of 1989. In 2022 a dead white humpback whale was washed up on a beach in Victoria that was thought to be Migaloo. After analysis by Victoria's Department of Environment, Land, Water and Planning (DELWP) it was confirmed that the stranded whale was female and therefore not Migaloo. Since the last reported sighting of Migaloo was in 2020, there have been some questions regarding the animal's status, but scientists suggest that long periods without observation are not unusual and could be due to changes in migration routes.

Migaloo is one of the most famous humpback whales on the planet, having a website dedicated to him. His popularity led to special declarations in Queensland protecting Migaloo and other whales that are greater than 90% white in colour. A non-approach zone of 500 metres in general and 610 metres for aircraft has been established.

== White colouration ==
There was discussion as to whether Migaloo's white colour was caused by true albinism or if he was leucistic or hypopygmented. The first records show that Migaloo has pinkish colour around the blowhole, no dark pigmentation in marks and scars, and seems to have skin abnormalities. These observations together provide strong evidence that Migaloo is a true albino. True albinism, or tyrosinase-related oculocutaneous albinism (OCA) occurs when tyrosine is not produced or is not properly metabolised into melanin, which can be a result of multiple mutations giving a variety of phenotypes, ranging from partial to complete albinism. More recently, a 2012 study by scientists from the Australian Marine Mammal Centre analyzed sloughed skin and skin biopsy samples from Migaloo in order to find the cause of the white appearance. They found a cytosine deletion in the DNA resulting in a truncated tyrosinase protein, a confirmed molecular basis of OCA1A, confirming Migaloo as a true albino.

=== Sightings in Australia ===
Other white humpback whales have been spotted in Australia and are considered rare. In 2011, a white humpback calf was sighted near the Great Barrier Reef. The calf goes by the name Migaloo Jr. as people hypothesise that it could be related to Migaloo but there is no confirmation. Migaloo Jr. has a dark spot on one fluke, leading to the possibility that he is leucistic and not a true albino.

In April 2022, another white humpback whale was spotted off the coast of New South Wales. It is suggested to be a young male and has small grey colouration.

In June of 2023, a white calf was recorded from a drone at Batemans Bay. In July of the same year, another was sighted by tour groups at Ningaloo Reef.

=== Sightings elsewhere in the world ===
White humpback calf sighted in Costa Rica swimming with an adult, photographed by Felipe Chávez

White humpback whale sightings are rare in other parts of the world but in 2012, a white adult humpback whale was sighted bubble-net feeding near the coast of Svalbard, Norway. The individual was completely white on the dorsal side but showed some dark coloration on the underside of the fluke. Because of the dark spots as well as the dark-coloured eyes, researchers suggest it is leucistic and not an albino. During the research, it was discovered that in 2004 and 2006 there were sightings of a white humpback whale in the Barents Sea. It is likely that it was the same individual but no identification is possible based on the existing photographs. In April 2022 a white humpback individual was spotted off the coast of Pico and Faial Island in the Azores; it is likely the same individual.

In 2022 another sighting of a white humpback was made. In October, near the coast of Costa Rica, a young white individual was sighted and photographed with a non-white adult. The calf was spotted by a pilot flying over north-western Costa Rica. This was the first sighting of a white humpback whale in the Eastern Pacific. This calf is hypopigmented, without a clear conclusion about the exact chromatic abnormality determining its white coloration.

== Name controversy ==
After a rise in popularity, the public wanted to have a name for the whale. The researchers chose the name "Migaloo". The term "migaloo" means "whitefella" amongst Aboriginal people in Queensland. The term was chosen after the researchers contacted local Aboriginal people in order to find an appropriate name for the whale.

There is discussion of whether the name is appropriate as Aboriginal terms for white people can have ambiguous meanings and can also describe disembodied human spirits. Some people consider the term "migaloo" as a name for a famous whale as a questionable choice considering the suffering white settlers have brought to the Aboriginal people of Australia.

== Migration ==
As a humpback whale, Migaloo undertakes seasonal migrations between the feeding grounds at high latitudes and the breeding grounds located in more tropical areas. He belongs to one of the seven breeding stocks recognised in the Southern Hemisphere, feeding mostly on Antarctic grounds, and moving north to breeding areas near Australia, where whales spend approximately two months.

Since his first sighting in 1991, the unique color of Migaloo has allowed scientists to study individual migration patterns, given the high availability of sightings data. Migaloo migrates along the eastern part of Australia at a migration rate of between 125 and 140 kilometres per day, with a mean speed of 5.2 km/h (3.2 mph), faster than the mean speed recorded for other humpback whales, likely because he is an adult male and endures faster travelling speeds than juveniles and females with calves, for example. Another reason for the high speed could be to avoid harassment from whale-watching boats and other recreational vessels.

This whale shows high consistency in his migration, passing through Cape Byron/Ballina approximately at the same time each year during both the northwards and southwards migration. Migaloo has been seen travelling mainly in pods of two individuals, but also alone or in surface-active groups.

Migaloo's absence from East Australian waters and his recent sighting in New Zealand might suggest that the migration route changes with time.
