= Georg Heinrich Borowski =

German zoologist

Georg Heinrich Borowski (26 July 1746 – 26 July 1801) was a German zoologist born in Königsberg (today's Kaliningrad), Kingdom of Prussia, to Andreas Ernst Borowski and wife, Maria Regina Negelken. His elder brother was the Archbishop of Koenigsberg, Ludwig Ernst von Borowski. He died in Frankfurt a. d. Oder, where he had taught at the university there.

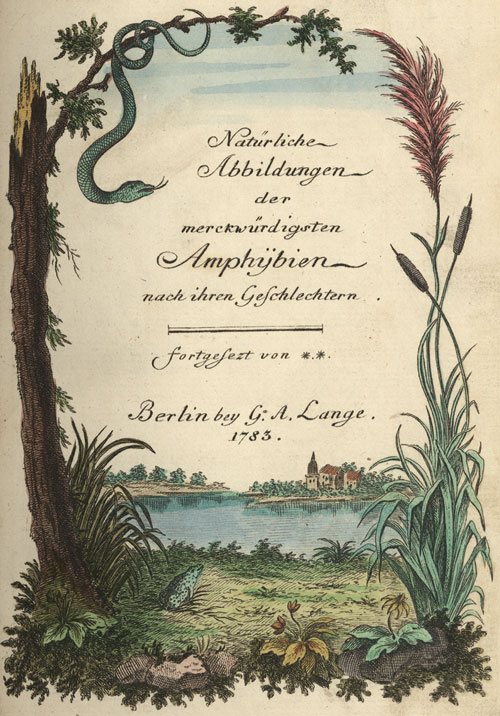
Naturgeschichte des Thierreichs Amphibien, 1783

Borowski was professor in the department of natural history and domestic economics at the University of Viadrina. In 1781 he described scientifically the Humpback whale (Megaptera novaeangliae) under the name Balaena novaeangliae in Gemeinnüzzige Naturgeschichte des Thierreichs.
