= Bubble-net feeding =

Feeding method used by humpback whales

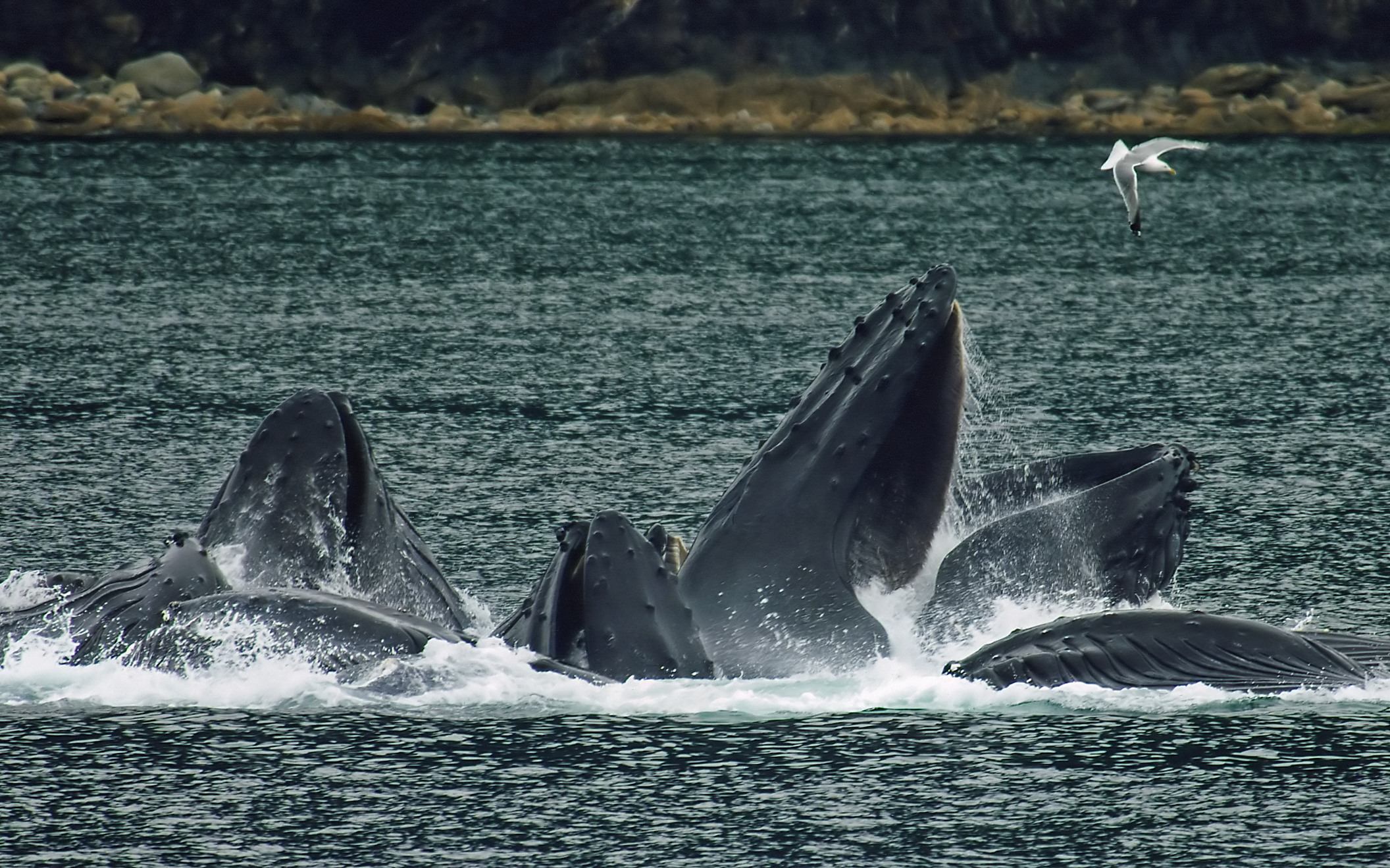
A group of 15 whales bubble net fishing near Juneau, Alaska

Whale bubble net feeding in Alaska.

Bubble-net feeding is a specialized feeding behavior primarily seen in humpback whales, in which groups of whales use exhaled air to create a "net" of bubbles that corrals schools of small fish or krill before a coordinated surface lunge. It is one of the few surface feeding behaviors that humpback whales are known to engage in, and is understood as being a learned rather than instinctual behavior; not all humpback populations practice it. A similar behavior has been observed in Bryde's whales though whether it is true bubble-net feeding remains uncertain. Groups of up to twenty whales may participate simultaneously; humpbacks may also perform a related technique called lunge feeding when alone.

Bubble-net feeding is a seasonal behavior, tied to humpback's annual migration to cold, prey-rich feeding grounds where they must accumulate enough energy reserves to sustain them through a winter breeding season, during which they do not eat.

== Method ==
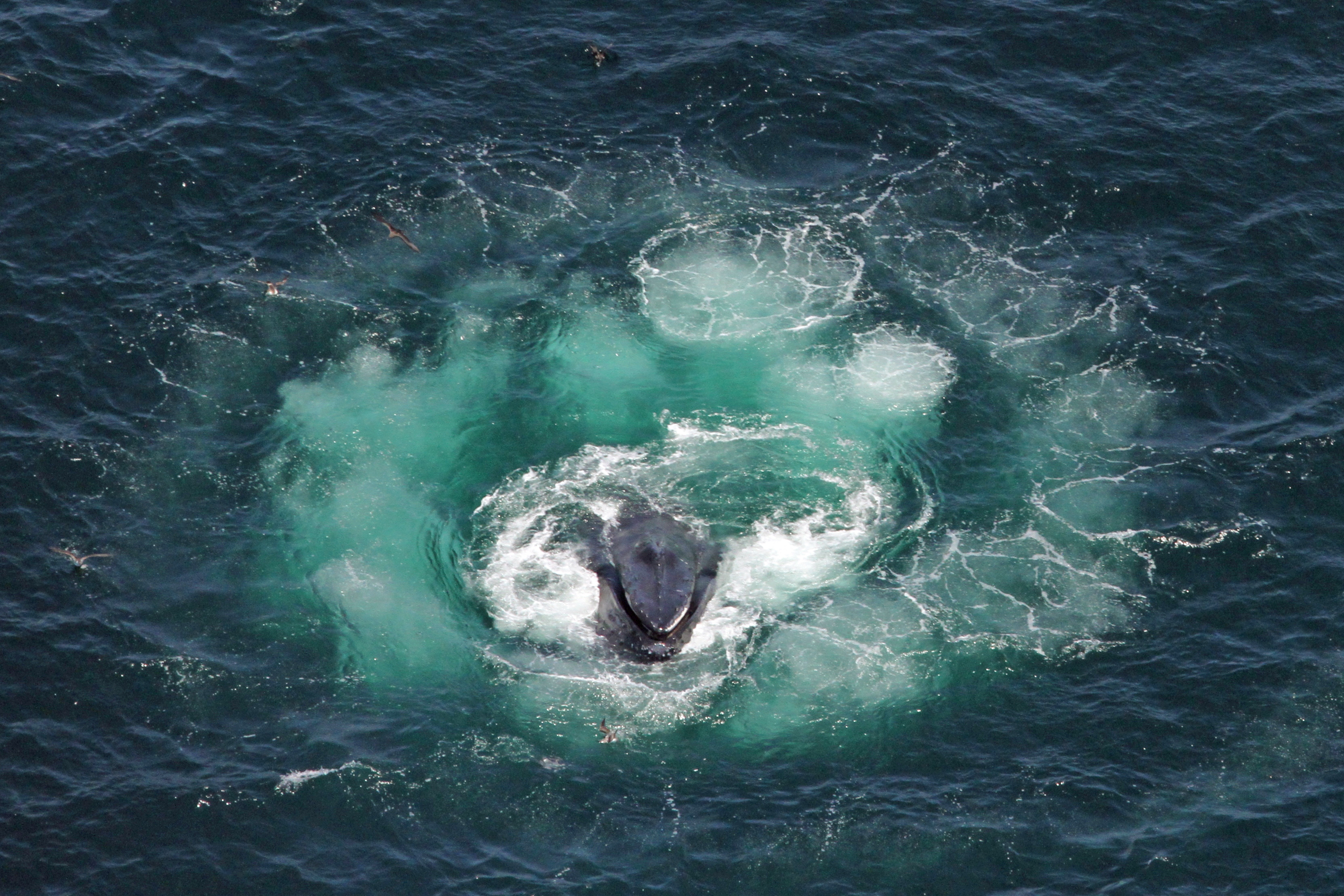
Humpback whale lunging in the center of a bubble net spiral.

Bubble-net feeding is a cooperative foraging method in which groups of humpback whales work together to concentrate and capture schools of small prey such as salmon, krill, or herring. The behavior is not instinctual, it is learned; not every population of humpbacks shows this behavior.

The process begins when one whale begins to exhale out of their blowhole beneath a school of fish, releasing a continuous stream of bubbles while swimming in an upward spiral. Other whales will join, expanding the spiral until the rising bubbles form a cylindrical "net" ranging from three to thirty metres (9.8 to 98.4 ft) in diameter.

The whales coordinate through vocalizations. One whale will sound a distinct feeding call, at which point all whales simultaneously swim upwards with mouths open to feed on the trapped fish. As the whales swim up to the surface to feed they can hold up to 30 cubic metres (1,100 cu ft) of sea water in their mouths. Humpback whales have expandable throat pouches or buccal cavities with 14 to 35 grooved pleats that run from the chin to the navel, allowing the mouth to expand to accommodate large volumes of water and prey. At the surface, the water is forced out through their baleen plates, retaining the prey for them to swallow.

The bubble wall appears to function as an acoustic wave guide. Because sound travels more slowly through water with bubbles than without, whale vocalizations that interact with the bubble net are refracted toward the mid-line of the cylinder, rather than passing through it. Effectively, the sound is trapped and intensified within the bubble net, and fish stay away from the loud wall and stay towards the quiet interior of the cylinder, where the whales dive up to feed.

Humpback whales do not always feed in large groups. On their own, they may engage in similar method referred to as lunge feeding. It is similarly executed as the whale dives down beneath a school of fish and rises to the surface with its mouth wide open. Once it reaches the surface it expectorates the excess water, separating the prey from the saltwater, and swallows. Lunge feeding is energetically expensive, and prey-concentrating behaviors like bubble-net feeding can improve the energetic return per lunge and allow multiple whales to feed simultaneously.

== Diet ==
Humpback whales have a vertical throat roughly the size of a grapefruit. They cannot physically swallow anything larger than that. They are carnivores and primarily feed on small fish such as krill, juvenile salmon, and herring. They are also baleen whales, which means that they do not have teeth, so they must be able to eat things that they can swallow whole. They have several vertical grooves running down the length of their body so that they can hold large volumes of water and fish at one time.

Humpback whales are migratory and only eat during half of the year. They feed for up to twenty-two hours a day, taking in anywhere from 4,400 to 5,500 pounds (2.0-2.5 tons) of food per day. The only time they feed is during the summer months; in the winter, they live solely off fat reserves that they have stored. They are not able to feed in warmer waters such as Hawaii or Mexico because there is no adequate habitat for the fish that they consume. Cooler waters, such as those off Southeast Alaska, are teeming with fish, making this a prime feeding ground for humpback whales during their feeding season.

== Setting ==
Bubble net feeding does not occur everywhere. Alaska's cold waters and the high amounts of sun exposure in the summer time produce food for humpbacks. Areas such as Antarctica and the North Pacific are host to diverse marine ecosystems that provide adequate feeding opportunities for humpback whales. Southeast Alaska, for example, is home to coastal glaciers that provide plentiful nutrients for suitable fish habitats. Areas with warmer waters such as Mexico and Hawaii where whales go to breed do not provide attractive habitats for fish which is why humpback whales rely on their fat reserves they have from their feeding season.

== Ecotourism ==
Until September 2016 humpback whales had been on the endangered species list since 1970 due to the massive whaling that occurred. The population has recovered due to enforced restrictions on whaling and the promotion of ecotourism. Whale watching companies can profit from taking tourists out to sea so they may observe humpback whale behaviors in their natural habitat, which can help promote conservation. There are strict rules enforced by the Coast Guard to help keep vessels from disrupting the whales’ natural behavior. As a general rule, boats are not allowed to come within three hundred yards (270 m) of marine mammals. If a marine mammal does approach a vessel, it must shut down its engines immediately to prevent affecting the animal's behavior. Bubble net feeding has become a key feature in the tourism industry. It is visually appealing and provides a good opportunity to learn about this species. Unfortunately it is also both a rare and unpredictable behavior. The nutrient rich waters that provide this feeding ground for the whales often do not have good visibility. The only indication of a bubble net occurring that can be sighted on the surface is a ring of bubbles coming up. It is also common to see birds flock to the area where the whales will feed hoping to catch the fish being brought to the surface.

While the population of humpback whales has been successful in making a comeback, there have been some concerns with how tourism has been affecting the whales and their natural environment. Taking people out on the water to view these animals can be disruptive and have a negative impact on their behavior. The increase in human to cetaceans contact has resulted in short term behavior changes, this includes feeding methods. Research is still being done, but one of the potential results from this increase in interactions is having to find food in other habitats. The amount of noise that is emitted from vessels is disruptive to communications between humpbacks and affects their ability to bubble net feed.
