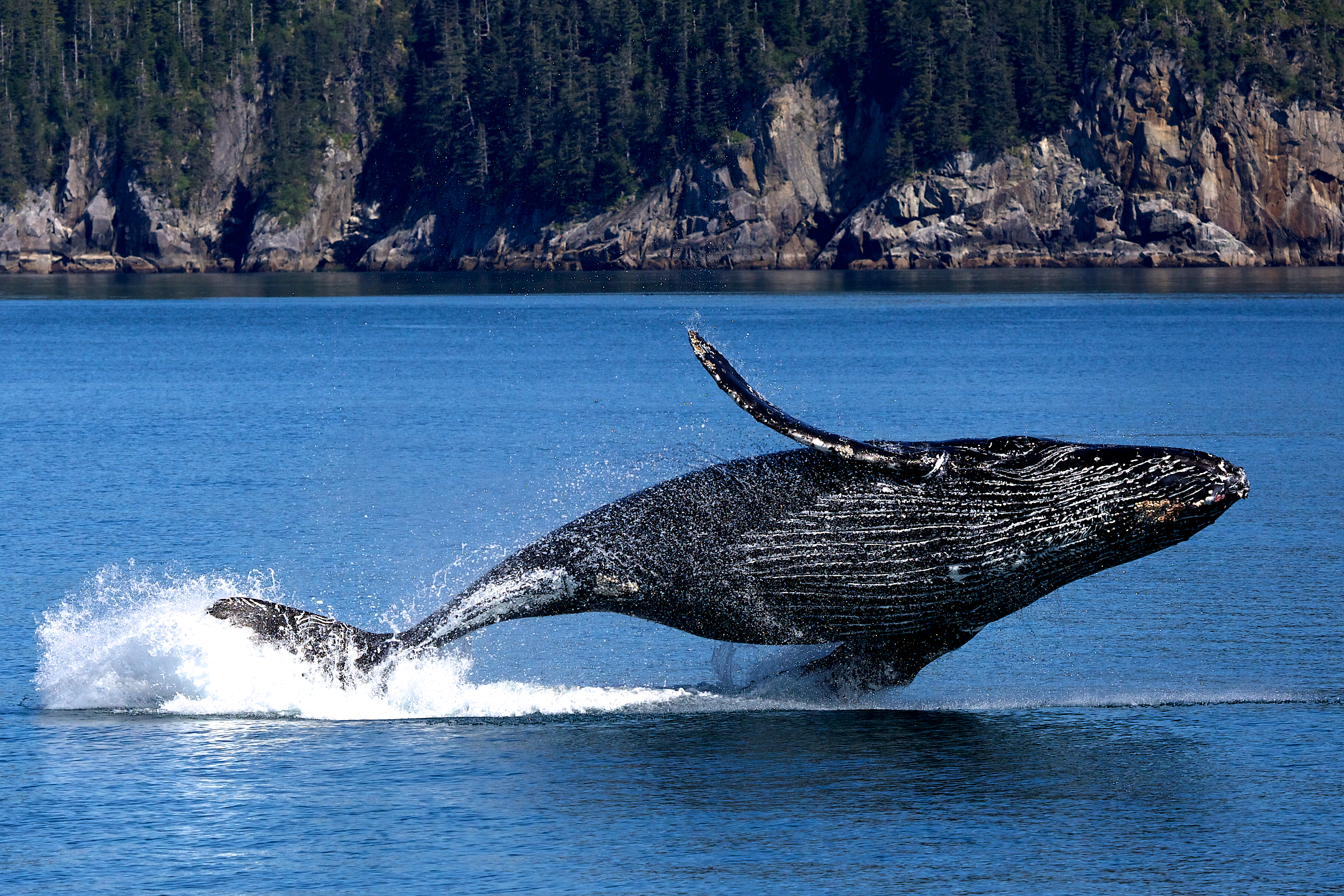
- North Pacific humpback whale breaching in Hervey Bay, Alaska

Scientific classification
- Kingdom: Animalia
- Phylum: Chordata
- Class: Mammalia
- Order: Artiodactyla
- Infraorder: Cetacea
- Family: Balaenopteridae
- Genus: Megaptera
- Species: M. novaeangliae
- Subspecies: M. n. kuzira

Trinomial name
- Megaptera novaeangliae kuzira Gray, 1850

= North Pacific humpback whale =

Humpback whale subspecies in the Pacific

The North Pacific humpback whale (Megaptera novaeangliae kuzira) is a subspecies of the humpback whale, native to the north Pacific Ocean.
