= Blowhole (anatomy) =

Hole (or spiracle) at the top of the head

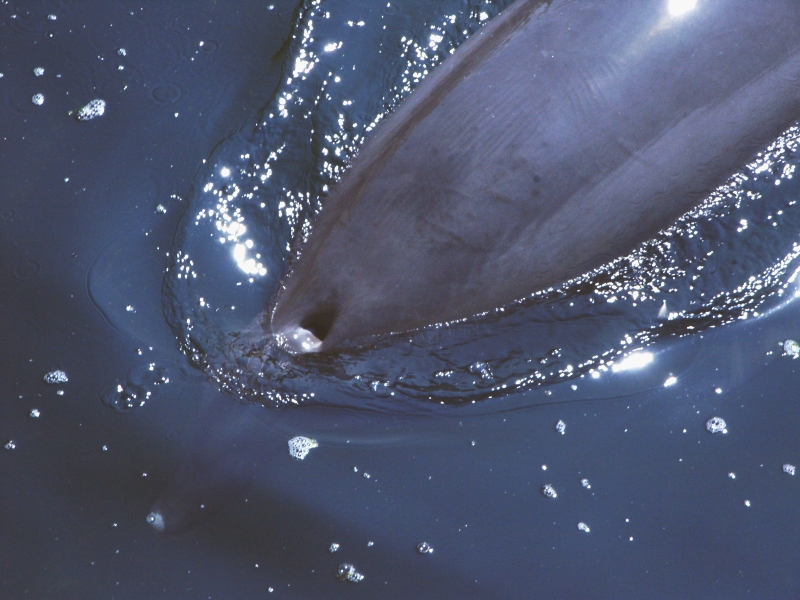
The single blowhole of a bottlenose dolphin just before going under again

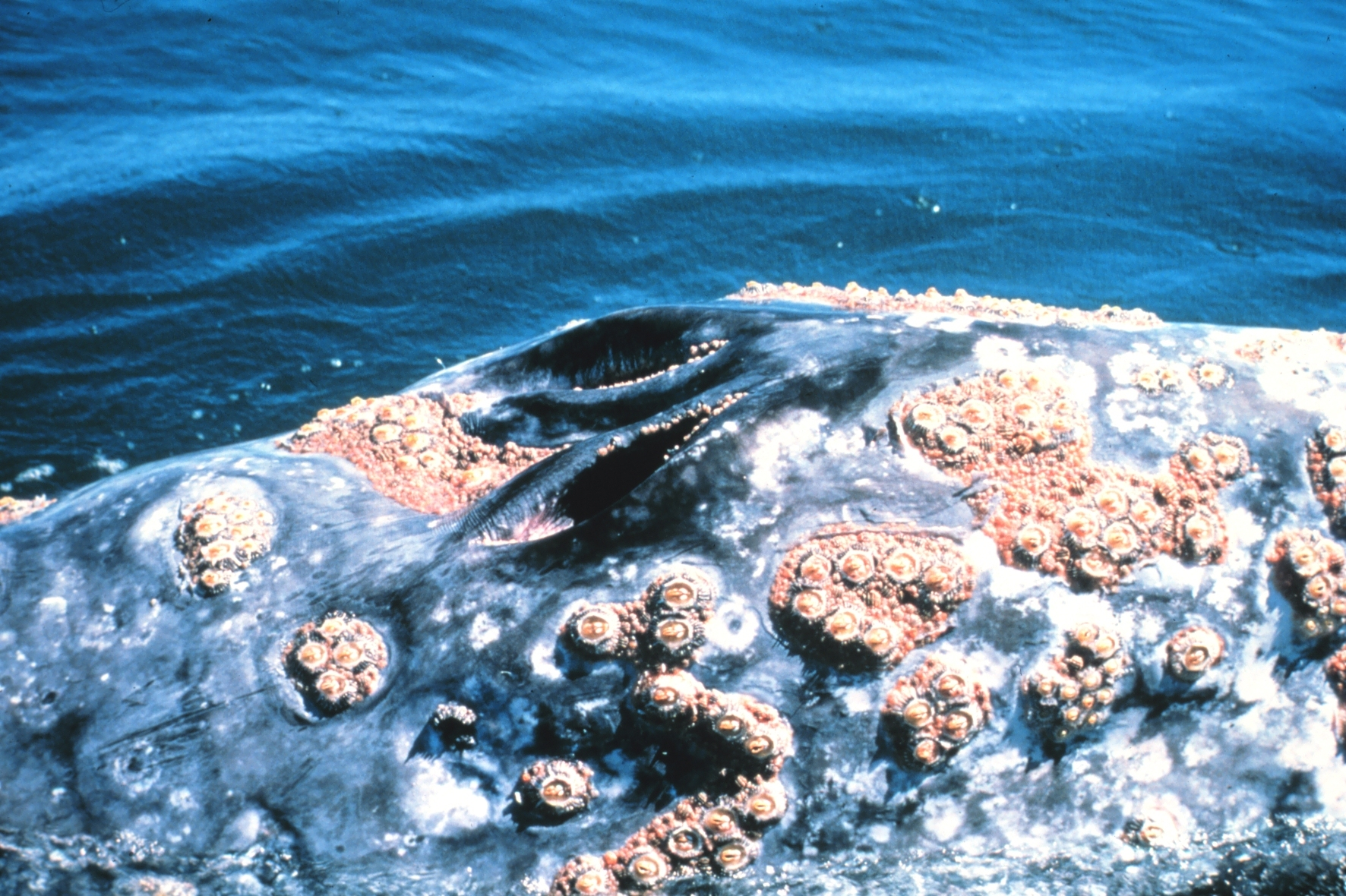
The V-shaped double blowhole of a gray whale

In cetology, the study of whales and other cetaceans, a blowhole is the hole (or spiracle) at the top of the head through which the animal breathes air. In baleen whales, these are in pairs. It is homologous with the nostril of other mammals, and evolved via gradual movement of the nostrils to the top of the head. The posterior placement of blowholes on cetacean heads is believed to minimize the energy used when breathing at the water's surface.

== Purpose and mechanism ==
Air sacs just below the blowhole allow whales to produce sounds for communication and, for toothed whales, echolocation. These air sacs are filled with air, which is then released again to produce sound in a similar fashion to releasing air from a balloon. When whales dive under water their nasal plug covers the nasal passage to the blowhole. The muscles controlling the nasal plug are relaxed during this time, but when the whale comes up for air these muscles contract and allow for the blowhole to be opened and the process of exhalation and inhalation to occur.

As whales reach the water surface to breathe, they forcefully expel air through the blowhole. The exhalation is released into the comparably lower-pressure, colder atmosphere, and any water vapor condenses. This spout, known as the blow, is often visible from far away as a white splash, which can also be caused by water resting on top of the blowhole. Spout shapes differ among species, which facilitates identification. This is followed by inhaling fresh air into the lungs. A humpback whale's lungs can hold about 5,000 litres (1,300 US gal) of air.

Baleen whales have two blowholes positioned in a V-shape, while toothed whales have only one blowhole. The blowhole of a sperm whale, a toothed whale, is located left of centre in the frontal area of the snout, and is actually its left nostril, while the right nostril lacks an opening to the surface and its nasal passage is otherwise well developed.

== Cultural significance ==
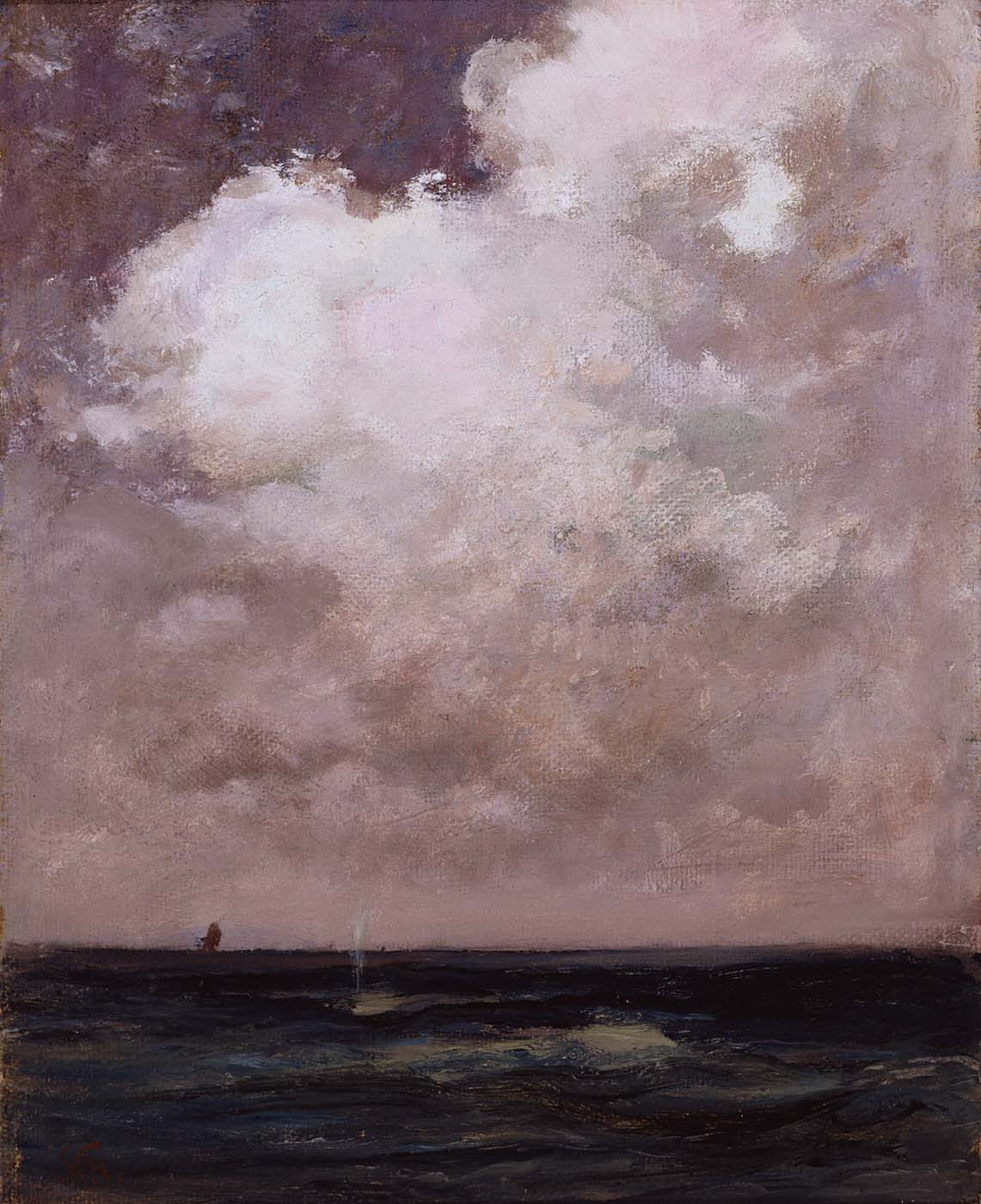
Spouting Whale (William Morris Hunt, c. 1870)

The spouting of whales has been observed and used in whale hunting throughout the world since ancient times. This has been depicted in rock carvings at Alta (northern Norway), which mostly date to 5000–4000 BC and 2000–1000 BC. Such carvings have also been found in South Korea (Bangudae Petroglyphs), British Columbia, and possibly New Zealand (Weka Pass shelter).

Whale spout features in Australian myths of creation and in European descriptions of monsters, such as the Procopius' Porphyrios and the Spouter in Olaus Magnus' Historia de Gentibus Septentrionalibus. A spouting whale is a major attraction in the Japanese Nagasaki Kunchi festival, which has been taking place since the early 17th century. It has been depicted in Western painting by Wenceslaus Hollar (1620s–30s), William James Linton (1830s), and William Morris Hunt (c. 1870). Mocha Dick, a whale from the early 19th century which inspired the novel Moby-Dick, had an unusual way of spouting.

A spouting whale has its proper Unicode character (U+1F433; emoji: 🐳) in the Miscellaneous Symbols and Pictographs block.
