= Benny the Beluga Whale =

Beluga whale

Benny
- Species: Beluga whale (Delphinapterus leucas)
- Sex: Unknown
- Known for: Entering the Thames Estuary

Benny is a beluga whale (Delphinapterus leucas) that made headlines in the United Kingdom in September 2018 after being sighted travelling towards London through the Thames Estuary. Benny was sighted several times over the ensuing weeks after his discovery in the Estuary, and appears to be healthy despite appearing alone.

In December 2018, Benny appeared to have taken residence in the estuary, as sightings continued. His continued presence caused the development of the Thames Tunnel to be delayed. Scientists later concluded that the whale departed the Thames Estuary in early 2019.

== Background ==
While sightings of belugas have been reported in the temperate waters of the Atlantic Ocean at latitudes similar to that of the UK, the species is normally social, and it is unusual for an individual of the species to be found alone. Beluga sightings in the vicinity of the Thames are especially rare; the most recent appearance of the species in the area was in 1913.

Various cetaceans have been found in the Thames over the years, the most famous of which being the River Thames whale, a juvenile northern bottlenose whale which entered the Thames in January 2006, and became stranded after travelling as far as Chelsea before dying from complications associated with its stranding.

== Sightings ==
On 24 September 2018, Benny was first sighted by people near Coalhouse Fort, Essex. Ecologist Dave Andrews reported that it had been feeding near a group of barges, and 'hasn't moved more than 200 metres in either direction.' Sightings continued throughout the day as speculation began to arise as to why he had chosen to travel to the Estuary.

On 25 September 2018, Benny was sighted further inland, off the shore at Gravesend, Kent. Conservationists and biologists feared that the whale may be lost and in danger of becoming stranded if it continued its course west towards London. Later that day, the RSPCA reported that Benny had changed course and was now heading east and appeared to be 'swimming strongly and feeding normally'. The whale was being monitored closely by the RSPCA and the British Divers Marine Life Rescue, while the Port of London Authority advised that boats on the estuary take care to avoid getting too close to the whale. A sighting on 28 September 2018 revealed that Benny had moved slightly further upstream. It is currently thought that the whale's movements were the result of it travelling around the same area to look for food. That day, BBC News reported that Benny was likely to be a sub-adult, and that medics from the BDMLR had concluded that "it had been exhibiting foraging behaviour, likely feeding, as well as surfacing and diving consistent with a healthy animal."

On May 13, 2019, local experts concluded that Benny left the estuary.

== See also ==
- River Thames whale
- Davina the Dolphin, a lone Bottlenose dolphin who resided off the coast of Folkestone & Hythe for approximately eighteen months from 2006-7
- Hvaldimir, a lone Beluga whale who was found in 2019 wearing a camera strap near Hammerfest, Norway, who subsequently became resident in the town's harbour
- 'Moby Dick', a Beluga which became a sensation in Germany in 1966 after being sighted in the Lower Rhine
- Tama-chan, a male Bearded seal which became a minor celebrity in Japan in 2002 after being found to be a resident of the Tama River in Tokyo
- Slippery the Sea Lion
- List of individual cetaceans
