= Panar (disambiguation) =

The Panar are a Muslim community of Gujarat, India.

Panar may also refer to:

- Tamil Panar, an ancient and mediaeval musical community of South India
- Panar (Kundapura), a community of Karnataka, India
- Panhar, or Pānar, a village in Hormozgan Province, Iran
- Panar, a tributary of the Mahananda River of India and Bangladesh

== See also ==
- Pana (disambiguation)
