= Pana =

Pana or PANA may refer to:

- Napakiak Airport (ICAO code), airport in Napakiak, Alaska
- Pana (mythology), a god in Inuit religion
- PANA, in telecommunications, a Plain ANAlog loop Alarm circuit
- Protocol for carrying Authentication for Network Access, a network access authentication protocol
- Pana, used for PanaPress of Pan African NewsAgency
- Another name for punch marked coins used in India until the third century
  - Pana (currency) or karshapana, an ancient Indian coin
  - Fanam (disambiguation) or panam, modern obsolete currencies of India
- Pana, the term for a snow knife in Inuktitut
- Pana language, a language spoken in the Central African Republic
- Pa Na language, a language spoken in Hunan, China
- Pana language (Gur), a language spoken in Burkina Faso and Mali
- Pana Wave or Pana Wave Laboratory, a Japanese new religious group
- "Pana" (song), a 2016 single by Tekno
- Peace and Neutrality Alliance, Irish pro-neutrality campaign group

== People ==
- Paná (footballer), Angolan footballer

== Places ==
- Pana, Burkina Faso, a village in Balé Province, Burkina Faso
- Pana, Gabon
- Pana, Tibet
- Pana, Illinois, United States
- Pana, Ontario, Canada
- Paňa, a village in Nitra District, Slovakia
- Pana, Indonesia
- Pa-na, Burma

== Other uses ==
- Pana, a slang term for St Patrick's Street in Cork, Ireland

== See also ==
- Panna (disambiguation)
- Panar (disambiguation)
- Panam (disambiguation)
- Fanam (disambiguation)
