= Pan-American =

Pan-American, Pan American, Panamerican, Pan-America, Pan America or Panamerica may refer to:

- Collectively, the Americas: North America, Central America, South America and the Caribbean
- Someone or something of, from, or related to the Americas
- Pan-Americanism, an integrationist movement among the nations of the Americas
- Pan American Union, later the Organization of American States
- Pan Am, a former international airline carrier based in the United States.
- Pan American Petroleum and Transport Company, a defunct oil company
- Pan-American (train), a L&N train that ran from Cincinnati to New Orleans
- SS Pan America, a steamship
- Pan American (band), an ambient/post-rock music ensemble
- "Pan American" (song), a 1947 song by Hank Williams
- The University of Texas–Pan American, now a part of the University of Texas Rio Grande Valley
  - Texas–Pan American Broncs, now the UTRGV Vaqueros

== See also ==
- Pan American Band Instrument Company
- Pan-American Car, by Packard
- Pan American Center, in New Mexico, United States
- Pan American Championship (disambiguation)
- Pan American Christian Academy, in São Paulo, Brazil
- Pan-American Exposition, Buffalo, New York, United States, 1901
- Pan American Games
- Pan American Health Organization
- Pan-American Highway
- Panamerican Karate Federation
- Pan American Petroleum and Transport Company, former oil company merged into Amoco
- Pan American Silver Corporation, a Canadian mining company
- American (disambiguation)
- Pan Am (disambiguation)
