= Panam =

Panam may refer to:

- Panam (film), a 1952 Indian Tamil-language film
- Panam (money), a type of currency issued in South India
- Pan Am, a former American airline
- Panam (brand), a Mexican footwear company
- Pan Am (TV series), a 2011 television series
- University of Texas–Pan American, an American university
- Bainang County, or Panam, a county in Tibet
- Panam, Afghanistan, a village in Afghanistan
- Panam station, a metro station in Daejeon, South Korea
- Panam Palmer, a character in Cyberpunk 2077

== See also ==
- Pan Am (disambiguation)
- Panama (disambiguation)
- Pan-American (disambiguation)
- Fanam (disambiguation)
- Pana (disambiguation)
- Paname, informal name of Paris
- Panem, a country in the fictional world of The Hunger Games
