= Pál Hamar =

Pál Hamar of Nemespann and Gyöngyöshalász (22 November 1817 Esztergom, Hungary – 10 January 1877 Budapest, Austria-Hungary) was a lawyer and writer.

== Biography ==
His father was Miklós Hamar, a judge in Nógrád County. He studied during his high school years from 1829 and 1833 in Vác and Esztergom. He learnt law and liberal at University of Pest. He took his exam as a lawyer of public law in 1840 and exam about promissory notes’ law in 1841.

From 29 September 1840 he was the acting vice-schrivener of Esztergom County. From 19 October 1843 he was the vice-schrivener of the meetings. From 19 January 1846 he was the prosecutor of the hercegprimas’ lands in Érsekújvár and gúta. He took part of the general assemblies, but did not attend from 1848 to 1860. Later he returned. He was elected as viceispán of the county, and took part of several Parliaments. He ended as the royal director of a foundation and ministerial councillor.

== Sources ==
- Szinnyei, József (2000), Magyar írók élete és munkái [Life and Works of Hungarian Writers] (in Hungarian), Budapest: Arcanum, ISBN 978-9638602992
- József Ponori Thewrewk: Magyarok Születés Napjai. 115.
- István bácsi Naptára 1863. 84.
- Vereby Soma 1866: Honpolgárok Könyve. 28.
- Petrik Könyvészete.
- Alajos Zelliger Alajos 1888: Esztergom-Vármegyei Írók. Budapest, 61.
