= River Thames whale =

Whale stuck in the River Thames

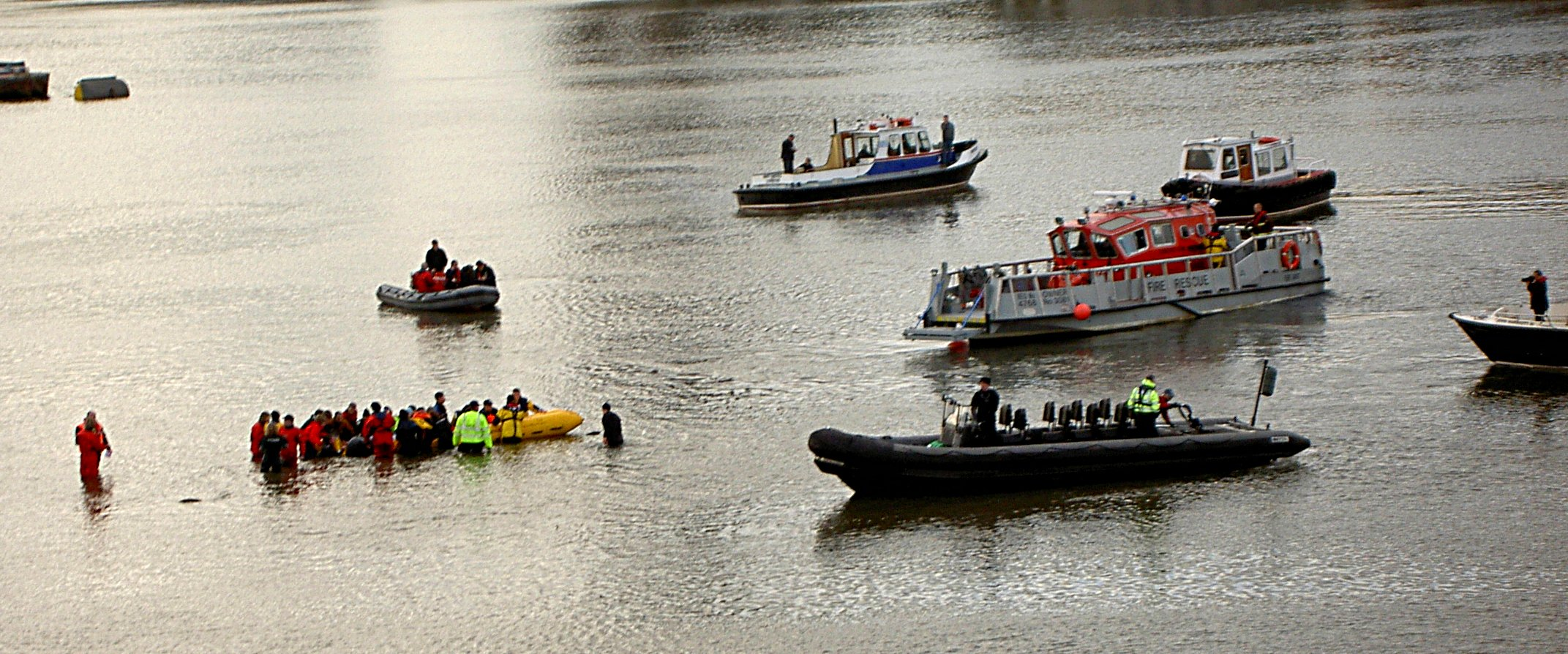
An attempt to rescue the whale near Battersea Bridge

The River Thames whale, affectionately nicknamed Willy by Londoners, was a juvenile northern bottlenose whale which was discovered swimming in the River Thames in central London on Friday 20 January 2006. According to the BBC, she was five metres (16–18 ft) long and weighed about twelve tonnes (24,400 lb). The whale appeared to have been lost, as her normal habitat would have been around the coasts of the far north of Scotland and Northern Ireland, and in the seas around the Arctic Ocean. It was the first time the species had been seen in the Thames since records began in 1913. She died from convulsions as she was being rescued shortly after 19:00 GMT on 21 January 2006.

== History ==
=== 19 January ===
On Thursday 19 January, reports from the Thames Barrier control team were made to the British Divers Marine Life Rescue (BDMLR) that one, or possibly two, pilot whales had come through the barrier. This turned out to be the bottlenose whale, and BDMLR commenced monitoring the whale that evening.

=== 20 January ===
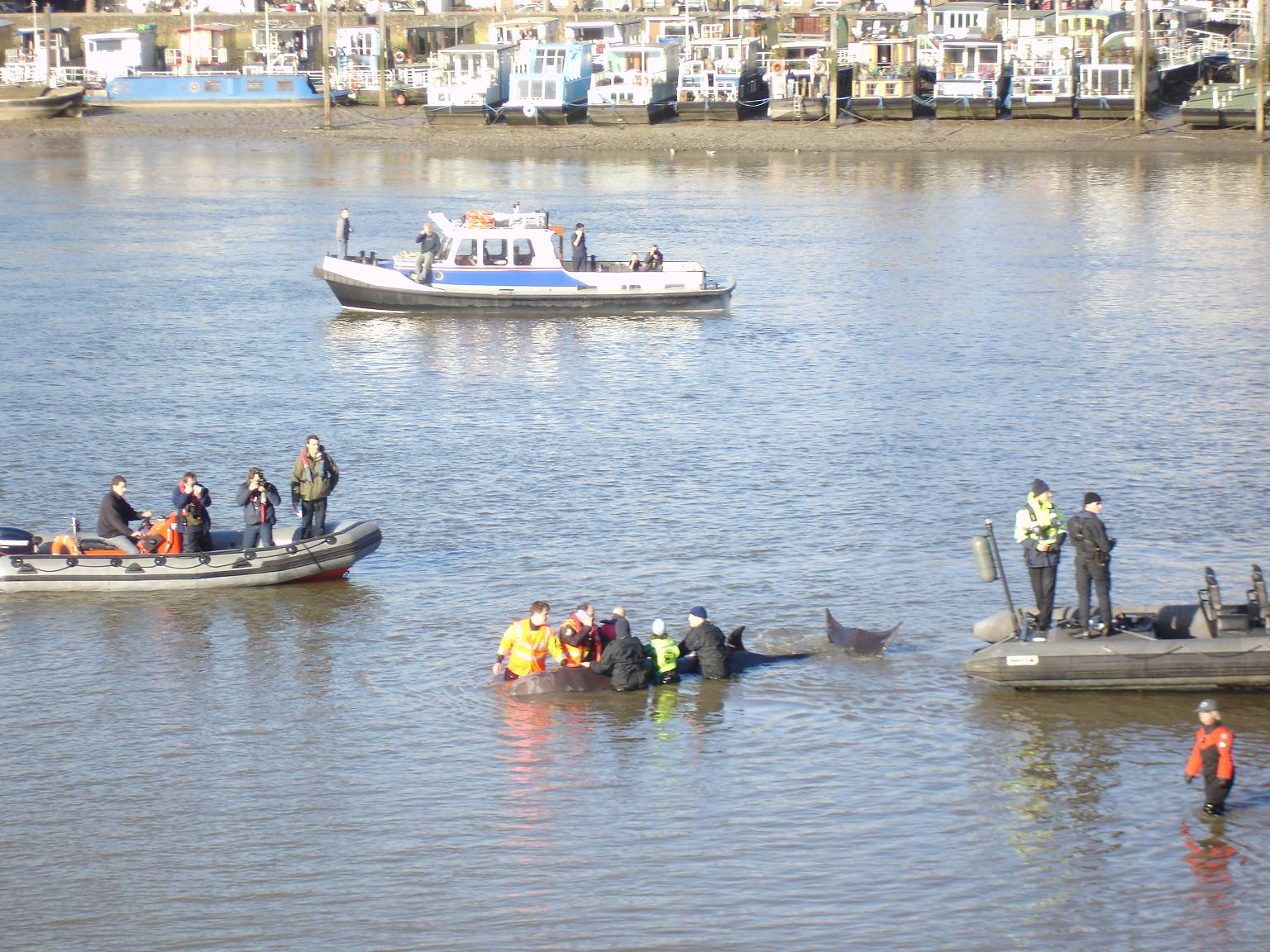
Rescue commences at noon

At 8:30 am on Friday 20 January, David Dopin was on a train when he phoned the authorities to say that he believed he had been hallucinating, as he thought he had just spotted a whale swimming in the River Thames. Throughout the morning, more and more whale sightings were reported, confirmed when television cameras captured the bottlenose whale on video.

The whale beached several times during the day as the tide went out. Members of the public went onto the foreshore to encourage the whale back into deeper water. Concern began to grow for the animal; bottlenose whales are used to swimming in seas up to 700 metres (2,300 ft) deep, but the Thames has a depth of only 5 metres (16 ft) at most. Blood was also visible.

As night approached, there were signs that the whale may have been swimming with the current out of London towards the sea: an unconfirmed sighting by a BBC cameraman at 9:00 pm placed the whale in Greenwich. The area was searched but nothing was found. There were no further official sightings until 1:10 am the following morning in Battersea, after the tide had changed. The whale was monitored until 3:30 am, when Jamie Henn, a Marine Mammal Medic volunteering for British Divers Marine Life Rescue (BDMLR) finally called the monitoring off as the whale would not strand at high tide.

=== 21 January ===
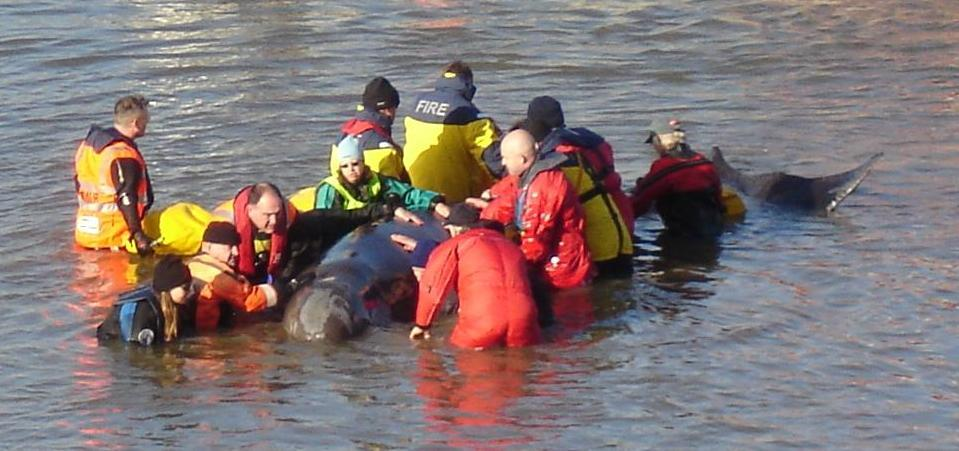
Shortly after noon, rescuers attempt to calm the whale whilst placing the yellow undersheet underneath her.

At 7:30 am the next morning BDMLR members, along with Port Authority officials, started observing the whale again. It was decided that the BDMLR would have to assist the whale as she was not strong enough to swim out of the Thames by herself, and had been losing ground against the tide.

There was fear later in the day that the whale could have perished, as she had not been seen for some time; however, she was spotted by a Port Authority boat at 9:26 am near Albert Bridge. The BDMLR decided it was time to act. With significant help from the Port of London Authority and the Metropolitan Police BDMLR medics decided to deliberately beach the whale at low tide on a sandbank, and then move her out of the Thames. At midday they were able to render assistance and make a medical examination.

After two hours, the whale was slowly and gently lifted onto a barge by a crane near Albert Bridge. By this stage there were thousands of people watching the situation develop from the banks of the river, and the images were seen across the world. The excitement of the previous day had disappeared, and there was now serious concern that the whale would be unable to survive for much longer. As the barge rushed along the Thames towards the sea, news channels provided non-stop coverage of the journey. It reached the Thames Barrier at approximately 5:00 pm. Later, despite the darkness, it was reported that crowds were lining the Queen Elizabeth II Bridge to catch a glimpse of the barge.

As each hour passed, there was growing concern for the whale's health, and she was said to be taking a turn for the worse due to being out of the water, as well as slowly being crushed by her own body weight. Plans to release the whale into the North Sea were shelved (the rescue team having previously put out a public appeal for a suitable boat); instead she was to be released off the Kent coast near Margate at Shivering Sands. All this time, the BDMLR were saying the final decision would be made by a vet on board, who would decide whether to release or euthanise the whale. Later the mammal was described as being "distressed", breathing heavily and developing muscle problems, the vet had decided to euthanise the whale, however at 7:08 pm on 21 January it was confirmed the whale had died from natural causes just prior to vet administering the euthanisation injection.

== Post mortem ==
A team led by veterinarian Paul Jepson carried out an immediate necropsy on the whale on behalf of the Zoological Society of London. The whale's body had several gashes along its underbelly, head and dorsal fin, most likely caused by collisions with boats and rubbing against the rocky river bed. It was confirmed that the whale was a female juvenile. The results, announced on 25 January 2006, showed that she had died from a combination of problems including dehydration, muscle damage and kidney failure.

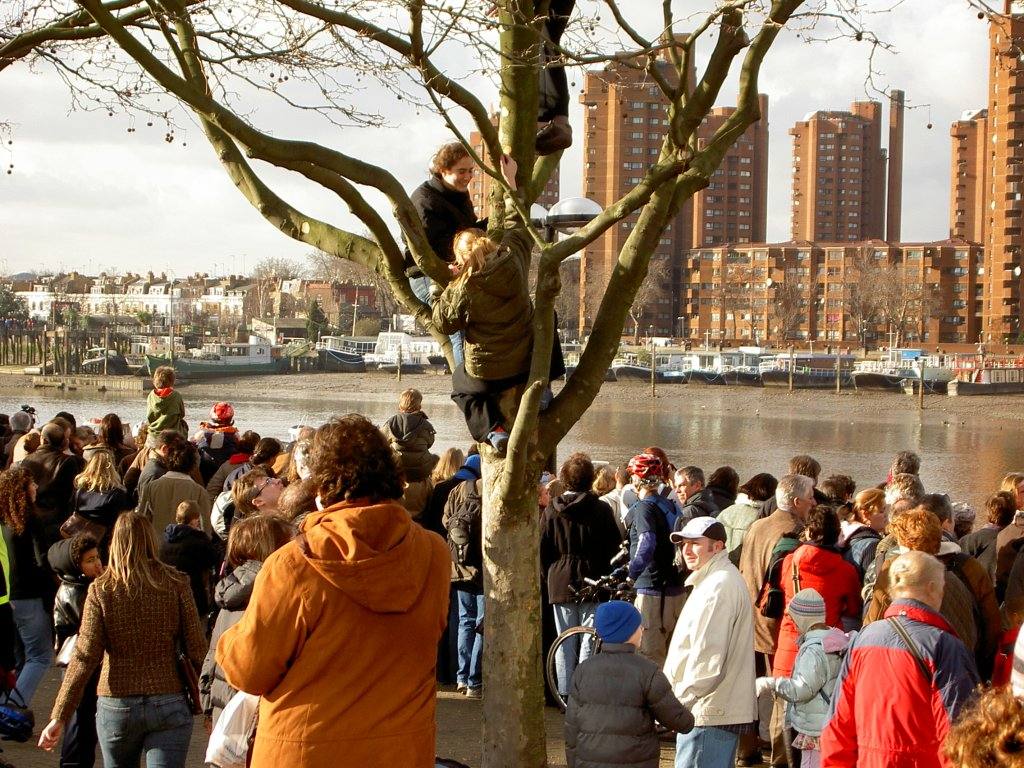
Crowds watching the rescue operation

According to the scientists who conducted the post-mortem, the most likely explanation for the incident was simply that the whale was seeking to return to its normal feeding grounds in the North Atlantic and took a wrong turn, mistakenly swimming west up the Thames rather than taking the longer route around the coast.

== Events after the whale's death ==
It was initially thought that the whale's body might be buried in a landfill, or incinerated if it presented a health hazard. After a campaign by The Sun newspaper to raise the £10,000 necessary for the recovery of the whale's skeleton, it was announced on 23 January that the bones of the mammal were to be given to the Natural History Museum with the intention that they be used for scientific research. Due to infrequent strandings of the species, it was the first complete northern bottlenose whale skeleton to enter the UK's national collection of marine mammal skeletons for more than 20 years. The skeleton was put on public display at the end of January 2007 at The Guardian and Observer Archive and Visitor Centre.

In 2006, the BDMLR placed for auction on eBay the small red watering can used during the attempt to keep the body of the whale wet on its journey down the Thames. The can was autographed by the rescue team. Following a 10-day auction attracting 50 genuine bids a total of £2,050 was raised. The auction was marred by dozens of spoof bids, several exceeding £1 million.

Damon Albarn wrote a song called "Northern Whale", which was recorded by his alternative rock band The Good, the Bad & the Queen for their album The Good, the Bad & the Queen. At their BBC Electric Proms concert (26 October 2006), Albarn introduced the song by saying:

"This next song started off as a love song, for someone I love. And then a whale came up the Thames... And it turned into a song about a whale."

On 21 December 2006 Channel 4 screened The Whale That Swam To London, a 60-minute documentary about the events of January 2006.

== Other whales ==
Throughout the two days that the whale was in the Thames waters, there were unconfirmed sightings of a second whale near the Thames Barrier and in Southend-on-Sea. On 21 January, whale song was reported around the Thames Estuary. The body of a porpoise was discovered upstream at Putney the same day. There is no indication that this incident had any connection with that of the Thames whale. There had been reports of a harbour porpoise in the Thames near Chiswick and Kew on the Tuesday and Wednesday prior to the Thames whale. BDMLR medics did several watches to no avail; the body of this porpoise washed up nearby on the same day as the whale rescue.

In early February, a sperm whale stranded itself in the Humber Estuary and died shortly afterwards. On 15 February 2006, a young adult male sperm whale was washed ashore in Skegness, Lincolnshire. Paul Jepson from the Zoological Society of London performed an autopsy. On 14 September 2009, a young humpback whale was washed ashore in the Thames at Dartford, Kent. It is thought to have died from starvation.

== See also ==
- Tama-chan, an Arctic bearded seal in the Tokyo area, which became a national celebrity in 2002
- Humphrey the Whale, which suffered a similar ordeal after accidentally entering San Francisco Bay, but survived
- List of individual cetaceans
