= Fanam =

Fanam was the currency used historically in major parts of South India, especially during the British Raj. Fanam is anglicized form of the Tamil word paṇaṁ, meaning "coin" or "wealth" (punch marked coins). It may specifically refer to:

- Madras fanam, a currency issued in Madras Presidency, now part of Tamil Nadu, India
- Travancore fanam, a currency issued in Travancore State, now part of Kerala, India

== See also ==
- Panam (disambiguation)
- Fana (disambiguation)
- Pana (disambiguation)
