= Davina the Dolphin =

Bottlenose dolphin near Shepway, England

Davina the Dolphin (formerly Dave the Dolphin) was a sociable solitary dolphin who resided off the coast in the Folkestone and Hythe area of England for approximately eighteen months. This was a very unusual situation as dolphins normally reside with family groups known as pods, and are not usually seen on their own. She was often spotted swimming in the English Channel.

== Time in Folkestone and Hythe ==
During her time in the area, Davina received several serious injuries from being struck by boat propellers of people going out to see her. In August, 2007, she received an injury to her dorsal fin that took several months to heal. Then, in October, she lost a third of her tail, and this was considered a life-threatening injury. She was successfully treated with antibiotics administered by a vet working with the cetacean rescue organisation British Divers Marine Life Rescue.

She was seen in the area after this, and her condition appeared to be improving. However, she suddenly went missing from the area shortly after this. She was last reported to be seen in early November 2007. Although BDMLR marine mammal medics are still visiting the area on a regular basis, she has not been seen since, and there are fears that she may have died of an infection to her tail wound or may have been caught in fishing nets and drowned. But there has been no confirmation of this either way and hopes are that she is still alive but has simply left the area or perhaps rejoined another pod of dolphins.

British Divers Marine Life Rescue had volunteers watching out for the safety of the dolphin and monitoring Davina and the behaviour of members of the public around her from the moment she appeared in the area. They also provided educational materials, passing out information leaflets to people on the beach and answering questions. Along with other organisations from the Marine Animal Rescue Coalition, BDMLR was concerned for the safety and well being of any solitary dolphin due to these animals often becoming harmed by human interaction. Davina is a female bottlenose dolphin, and she is estimated to be about 6 years old according to the MARC.

On 9 June 2007, two men were arrested while swimming with Davina, for the crime of 'disturbing' a dolphin. They pleaded not guilty. On April 17, 2008 Michael Jukes, 27 and Daniel Buck, 26, were both ordered to carry out 120 hours of unpaid work after magistrates convicted them of intentionally or recklessly disturbing a wild animal contrary to the Wildlife and Countryside Act of 1981.

== See also ==
- List of individual cetaceans

== External links — Davina in the news ==
The dolphin has repeatedly made it on to the Kent Online and BBC News website:

Kent Online

- How dolphin begged swimmers to leave her alone
- Still no sign of missing Dave the dolphin
- Fears for safety of 'missing' Dave the dolphin
- Dave the dolphin responding well after serious injury
- Battle is on to save Dave's life
- Dave tail injury 'could be fatal'
- Bid to save Dave the Dolphin's life
- Warning after jet skiers harass 'celebrity' dolphin
- Sign up and help save Dave the dolphin
- Save Dave the dolphin stay away from him

BBC News

- Cinderella stars 'dolphin Dave'
- Dolphin Dave 'becoming a danger'
- Dave the dolphin film criticised
- Dolphin fans 'urged to keep away'
- Dolphin Dave honoured with award
- Dolphin Dave boosts town's trade
- Kayakers harassing 'dolphin Dave'
- Dolphin 'at risk from being tame'
- Search on the BBC Website

Other media

- Davina, the friendly dolphin with half a tail
- The Telegraph: Tougher laws needed to protect friendly dolphins

=== Other links ===
- British Divers Marine Life Rescue
- Dave the Dolphin
