= Tama-chan =

Wild bearded seal

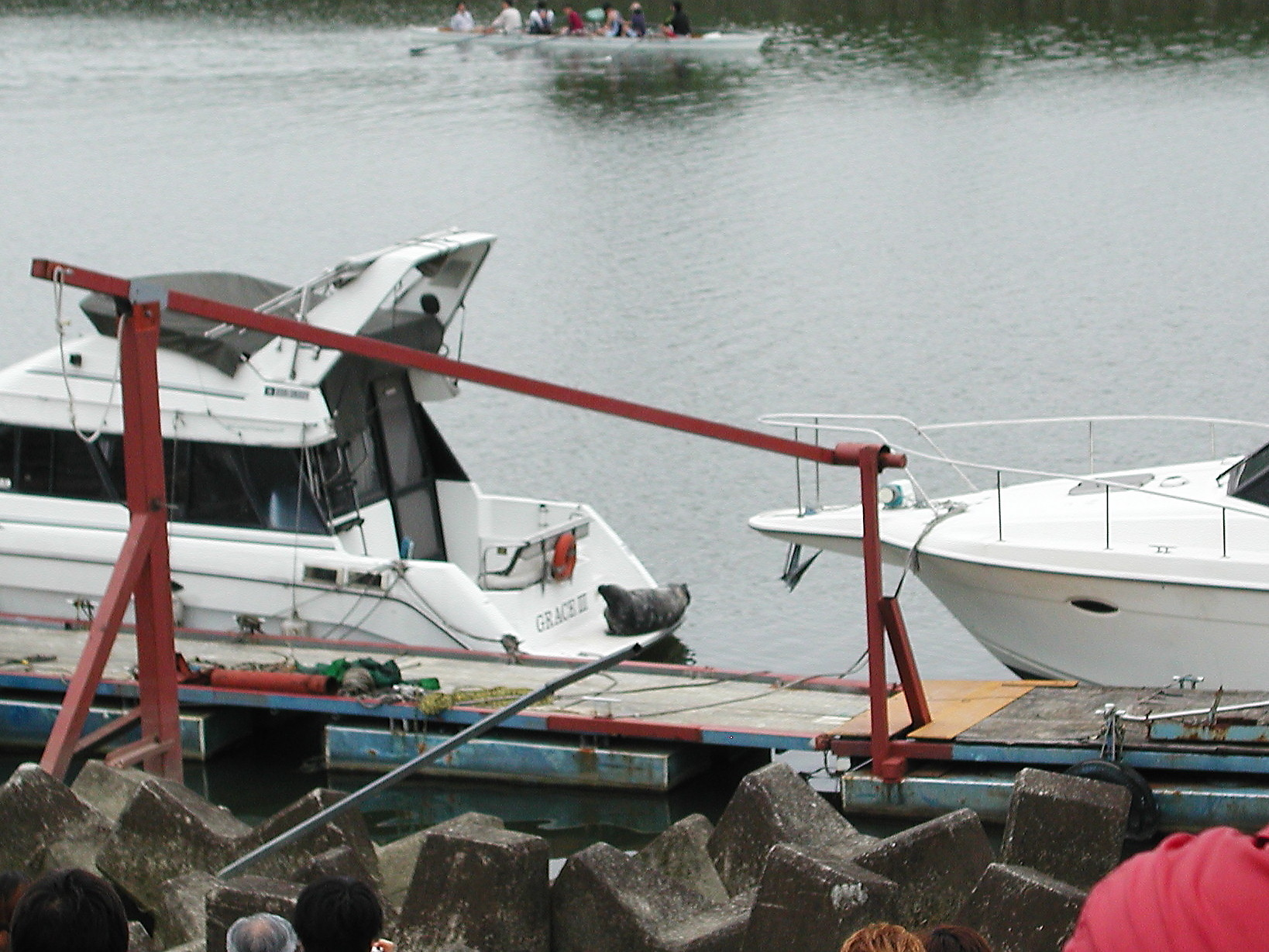
Tama-chan in Ara river, in Asaka, Saitama

Tama-chan (タマちゃん) is the name given to a male bearded seal which was first spotted on August 7, 2002, near Maruko Bridge on Tama River in Tokyo, Japan, and subsequently became a national celebrity in Japan.

== Name ==
Tama-chan is named after the river (Tama) where he was first sighted. Strictly speaking, Tama is the actual name of the seal, and the -chan suffix is a Japanese title (similar to -san) which marks endearment and/or cuteness.

== Sightings ==
The first sighting of the seal was reported heavily in the Japanese media amid speculation as to whether the normally arctic seal could survive in a Tokyo river during summertime. Subsequent sightings generated massive publicity as huge crowds gathered to watch and TV crews broadcast live footage across Japan.

Tama-chan subsequently moved to rivers in nearby central Yokohama where he was a regular sight in Tsurumi and Katabira Rivers for the following months. Thousands gathered on bridges in the city daily to catch a glimpse of the celebrity animal. Merchandise went on sale and fan clubs were organised, and daily updates on Tama-chan were broadcast on TV. Seeing the seal was said to have a "healing" effect on people.

== Jūminhyō registration and controversy ==
Yokohama's Nishi Ward even granted an honorary jūminhyō (residency registration) to Tama-chan. In early 2003 this prompted a group of foreign residents protesting against the fact that jūminhyō is only open to Japanese citizens (foreign nationals were registered under a separate system), to stage a march with whiskers drawn on their faces to demand a jūminhyō even though Saitama Prefecture has given fictional jūminhyō to public fixtures before either real or imaginary, such as Crayon Shin-chan. That system was later changed, and from July 9, 2012, foreign nationals residing in Japan are registered in the jūminhyō.

== Attempted capture ==
In March 2003, a local citizens' group attempted to capture the seal with fishing nets in order to send it back to Arctic waters with the help of a little-known US-based group called "Marine Animals Lifeline". A doomsday cult called Pana-Wave Laboratory, which was revealed to be behind this group, pseudoscientifically thought that electromagnetic waves led the seal astray, and also that returning the seal to arctic waters would somehow "save the world from destruction". The cult had even built two swimming pools to keep the animal until it could be transferred. The illegal attempt failed when Tama-chan slipped through the net.

Tama-chan disappeared out of sight a few days later. When Tama-chan reappeared in Nakagawa river in Tokyo with a fishing hook embedded in his right eyebrow, it made national headline news and Japan's Environment Minister Shun'ichi Suzuki was asked about the well-being of the animal.

== Last sighting ==
Tama-chan lived in the Arakawa River. Attention from the media, not to mention the Pana Wave Laboratory, faded, and the crowds reduced to a handful of Tama-chan watchers and amateur photographers. Signs in the vicinity warned people that anyone attempting to capture or harm the animal would be prosecuted, and that the river bank was under CCTV surveillance. The last confirmed sighting occurred on April 12, 2004.

In following years, a number of other seals have been spotted around Japan. In 2004 "Kamo-chan", a one-year-old spotted seal, was spotted near Kamogawa, Chiba and in 2011 "Ara-chan", another spotted seal, appeared in Saitama Prefecture's Arakawa river in 2011.

== See also ==
- Slippery the Sea Lion
- Benny the Beluga Whale
