= Pana Wave =

Japanese new religious group

- パナウェーブ研究所
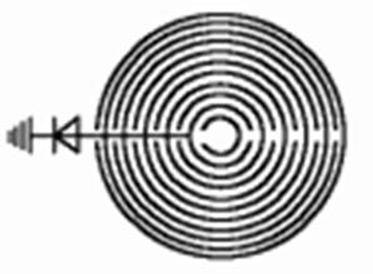
- Location: Japan
- Parent organization: Chino-Shoho
- Website: www.pana-wave.com

The Pana-Wave Laboratory (Japanese: パナウェーブ研究所) is a division of the Chino-Shoho group, which is a Japanese new religious group.

== Overview ==
Pana-Wave is a division of a religious group called Chino-Shoho based in Shibuya, Tokyo, founded by a woman called Yuko Chino in 1977 and combining elements of Christianity, Buddhism and New Age doctrines. Estimates of membership range from several hundred to 1,200. It has been classified as a contactee or UFO religion.

== Pana-Wave Research Institute ==
The Pana-Wave Laboratory claimed that "scalar electromagnetic waves are harmful to the human body," and its members wore white robes (long-sleeved coat-type white robes, white masks, white hoods, and white boots) which they claimed were effective in protecting themselves from scalar electromagnetic waves. They also affixed spiral patterns to their vehicles, which they claimed were effective in blocking scalar electromagnetic waves. However, according to Shigeo Katori, who covered the story at the time, the followers were using their cell phones in convenience stores without any concern for electromagnetic waves. Furthermore, some believed the claims of the leader, Yuko Chino, while others followed along despite their doubts.

The group was established as a voluntary organization around 1977 and operated under the name Chino Seihō (千乃正法; 'The True Law of Chino'). In September 1997, one of its leaders was arrested on suspicion of obstructing traffic after blocking a town road in Sakutō-chō, Aida-gun, Okayama Prefecture (now Mimasaka City). Due to its bizarre nature, its activities were widely covered on talk shows and other media in April and May of 2003, making it temporarily famous. Furthermore, because the research institute's name includes "Pana," it has been questioned about its connection to Panasonic (then known as Matsushita Electric Industrial Co., Ltd. and Matsushita Electric Works Co., Ltd.), (Note: Due to the name change to Panasonic Corporation and Panasonic Electric Works on October 1, 2008, the 'Matsushita' corporate names, such as Matsushita Electric Industrial and Matsushita Electric Works, were retired as of September 30, with a few exceptions (notably Matsushita Memorial Hospital, a corporate hospital owned by Panasonic).) but it is completely unrelated to the company and its affiliates.

Ideologically, it is anti-communist and claims that "communists are attacking Japan with 'scalar electromagnetic waves'." As an example, it points to the wrapped portion of power lines on utility poles (the excess wire left over during installation) and claims that attacks are being carried out by generating scalar electromagnetic waves there, stating that the founder is a victim of this attack.

It has been touring nationwide since 1997.

In 1999, it participated in the "Symposium on Electromagnetic Fields, etc., Kyoto Conference," where it presented its views on the scalar electromagnetic wave problem. They claim that artificially created scalar electromagnetic waves pollute the natural environment, destroying it, endangering the survival of plants and animals, and ultimately leading to the extinction of humanity. Furthermore, they claimed that the emission of large amounts of artificial scalar electromagnetic waves would affect the Earth's revolution and rotation, potentially leading to its collapse.

They revealed that they had been continuously feeding Tama-chan, a bearded seal whose habitat had been confirmed in the Katabira River and other areas of Nishi Ward, Yokohama City since September 2002.

Around April 26, 2003, they occupied a forest road from Hachiman-cho (now Gujo City) to Yamato-cho (now Gujo City), Gujo District, Gifu Prefecture. Around May 2 of the same year, they occupied National Route 472 in Kiyomi-mura (now Takayama City), Ono District, Gifu Prefecture. On May 15 of the same year, they claimed that a natural disaster would occur and urged their members to evacuate to a dome-shaped facility in Oizumi-mura (now Hokuto City), Kitakoma District, Yamanashi Prefecture.

On May 9, 2003, Justice Minister Mayumi Moriyama announced at a press conference that the Public Security Intelligence Agency was investigating the matter. The turmoil ended on May 10 when the group returned to their base in Fukui Prefecture. On May 14, the Tokyo Metropolitan Police Department's Public Security Department raided facilities nationwide on suspicion that the group had registered vehicles falsely. The head of the research institute (a different person from Yuko Chino) and three inspectors from the auto repair shop were indicted, and on May 25, 2004, the Fukui District Court sentenced each of them to one year and six months imprisonment with a suspended sentence.

On August 7, 2003, Satoshi Chigusa, an associate professor at Fukuoka University of Education and a central member of the group who wrote anti-communist papers, died under mysterious circumstances at a facility in Gotaishi-cho, Fukui City (a small hamlet inhabited by 22 elderly people in 12 households). Police investigations revealed the cause of death to be traumatic shock from a blow to the back and heatstroke. On December 5, five members were arrested on suspicion of causing death through injury.

In the summer of 2004, Shigeo Katori, who was conducting interviews, was parked near the group's base when he was shone with a searchlight and chased for several kilometers at high speed in a white four-wheel drive vehicle with the words "Stalker car in pursuit" (ストーカー車追跡中) written on it. Around the fall of the same year, the group began feeding crows, causing damage to surrounding crops. Despite requests from the local community association and Fukui City to stop, the group insisted on protecting wild animals. Fukui City authorized a one-month extermination campaign starting May 2, 2006, which was carried out by local hunting association members.

Even before becoming famous in 2003, they were reportedly involved in activities such as sending documents to the Japanese Communist Party.

Around 2005, the entire headquarters was covered with white cloth, and spiral symbols were affixed around the facility, eventually extending to the surrounding trees.

On October 26, 2006, the leader, Yuko Chino, died at the age of 72.

In 2009, the white cloth was almost completely removed, and the Pana-Wave Research Institute sign was taken down, but a new company name for a publishing company that exclusively handles books by Chino Seihōkai was displayed. Furthermore, a new building was confirmed to have been constructed on the premises, increasing the number of buildings from one to four.

In October 2011, according to an interview with the Fukui Shimbun, the research institute had changed dramatically and now looked like an ordinary house. Those inside responded that "the Pana-Wave Research Institute no longer exists," suggesting it had simply disappeared.

On May 8, 2021, Shigeo Katori, a freelance writer who regularly visited the PanaWave Research Institute's headquarters, visited the site. He wrote that the residents appeared to be living peacefully without any trouble within the settlement.
