= Pan American Band Instrument Company =

Pan American Band Instrument Company was a musical instrument manufacturing company headquartered in Elkhart, Indiana. Elkhart has been known as "the Musical Instrument Capital of the World". The company existed between 1917 and ca. 1930, when it was absorbed by its parent company C.G. Conn Ltd.

== History ==
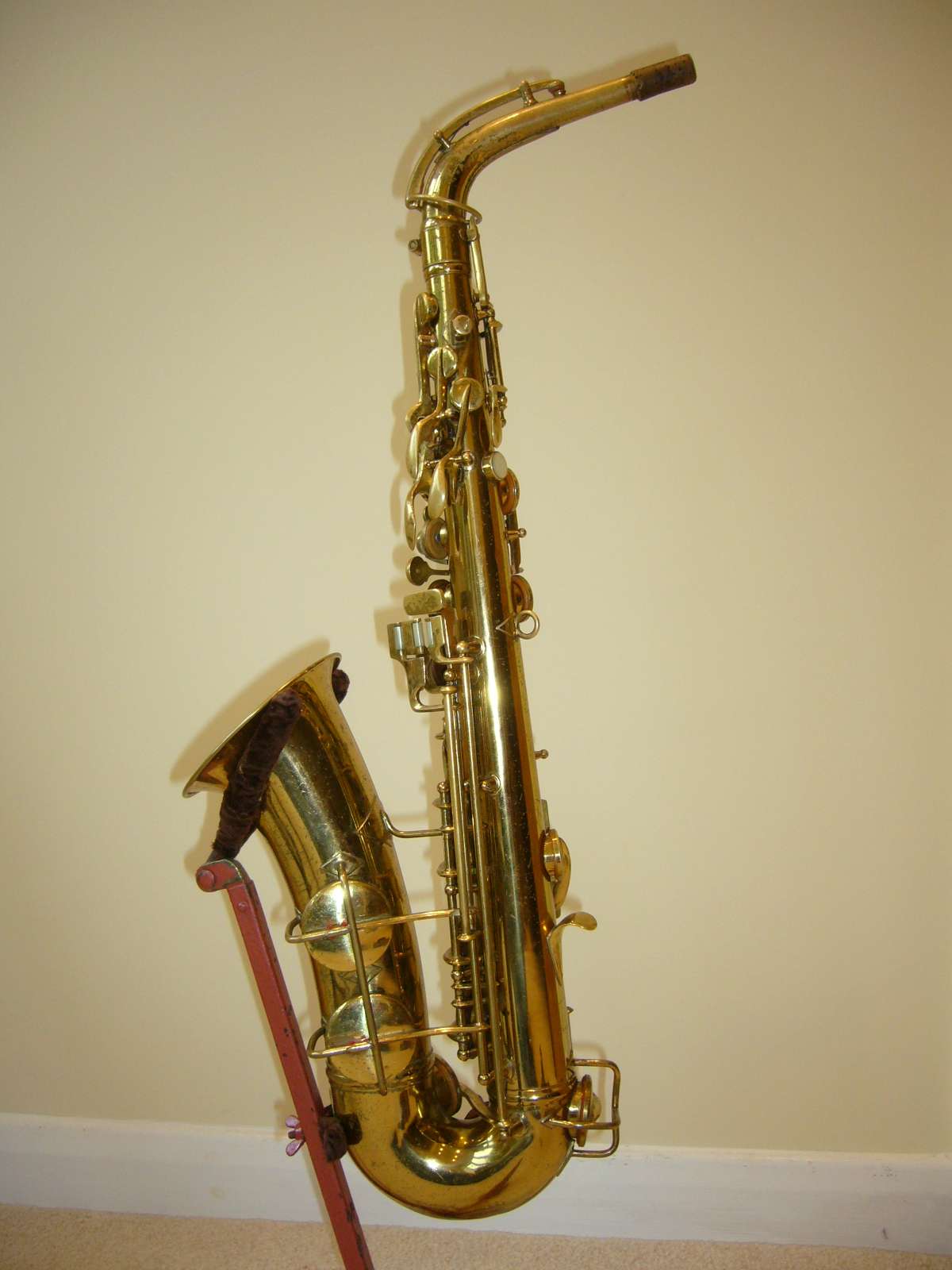
A Conn 'Pan American' alto saxophone, manufactured circa 1948. This saxophone has a similar body to a Conn 6M and keywork which is reminiscent of a Conn New Wonder

The company was founded in 1917 by Carl Dimond Greenleaf, (July 27, 1876, Wauseon, Ohio - July 10, 1959, Elkhart, Indiana) who was president of C.G. Conn. Greenleaf was expanding Conn's production of musical instruments, seeking to develop the amateur and educational markets for musical instruments, and developing retail sales distribution to expand Conn's sales channels beyond their mail-order business. Formation of the new instrument manufacturing company was the foundation of Conn's effort to develop the student and amateur markets. In 1919, Pan American's production was moved to the former Angledile Scale Company factory which was also owned by Conn. The factory produced Pan American branded instruments as well as blank instruments to be sold under merchandisers' "stencil" brands. Conn also founded the Continental Music distributing company in 1923 to establish its retail presence across the United States. After about 1930, PABIC was absorbed by its parent company Conn. Use of the Pan American trademark for Conn's second-line instruments continued until 1955. Cavalier and Continental Colonial were other trademarks for second-line instruments sold through Conn's main channels.
