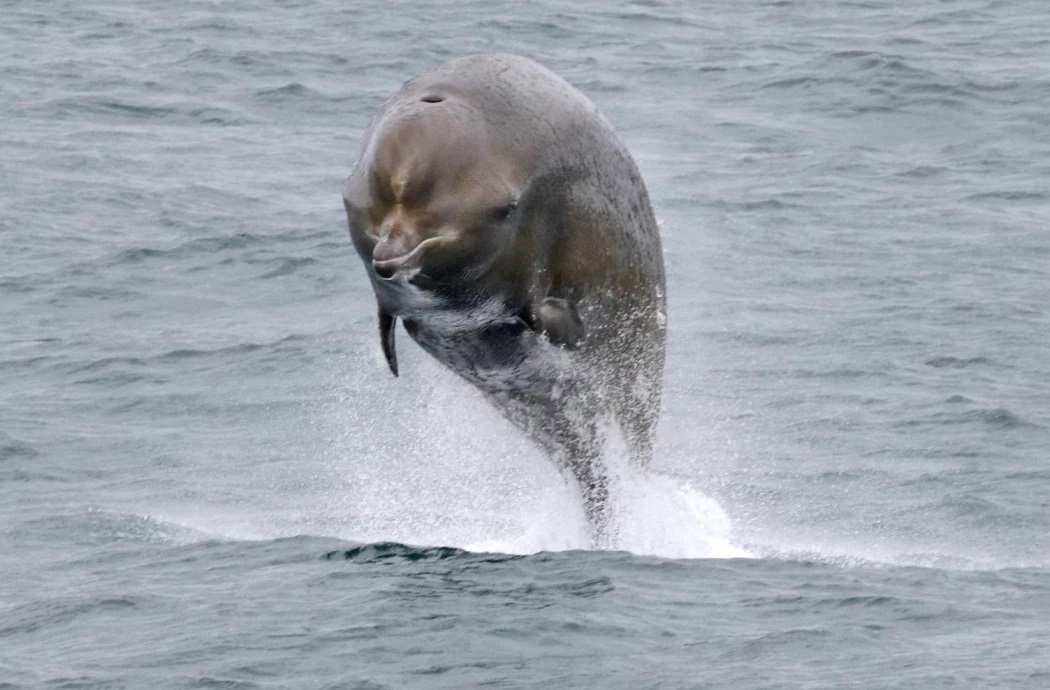
- Adult breaching.
- Size compared to an average human

Conservation status
- Near Threatened (IUCN 3.1)

- Apparently Secure (NatureServe)
- CITES Appendix I

Scientific classification
- Kingdom: Animalia
- Phylum: Chordata
- Class: Mammalia
- Order: Artiodactyla
- Infraorder: Cetacea
- Family: Ziphiidae
- Genus: Hyperoodon
- Species: H. ampullatus

Binomial name
- Hyperoodon ampullatus (Forster, 1770)
- Northern bottlenose whale range (now out of date - see IUCN map below)

= Northern bottlenose whale =

Species of mammal

The northern bottlenose whale (Hyperoodon ampullatus) is a species of beaked whale in the ziphiidae family, being one of two members of the genus Hyperoodon. The northern bottlenose whale was hunted heavily by Norway and Britain in the 19th and early 20th centuries. It is one of the deepest-diving mammals known, reaching depths of 2,339 m (7,674 ft) and capable of diving for up to 130 minutes.

== Description ==
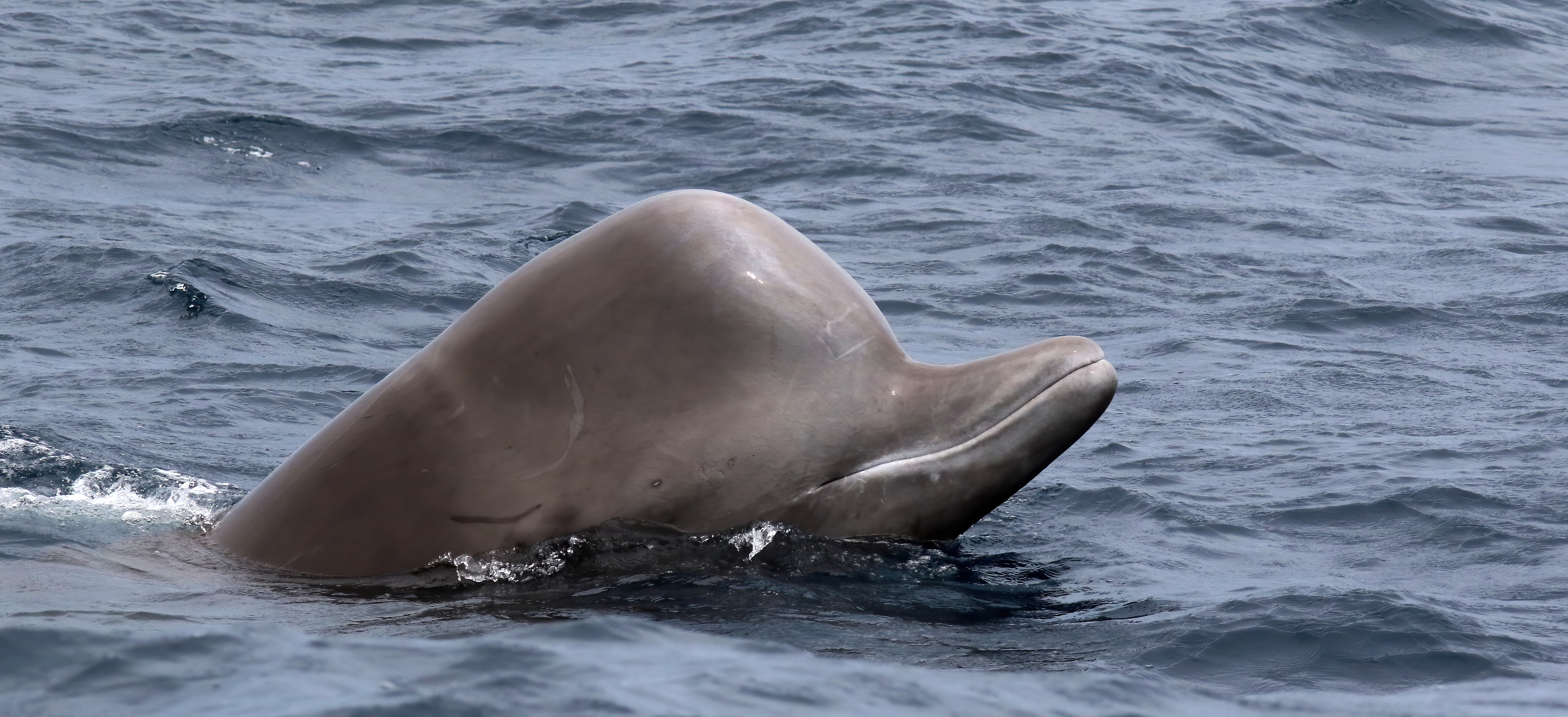
A male northern bottlenose whale in Newfoundland.

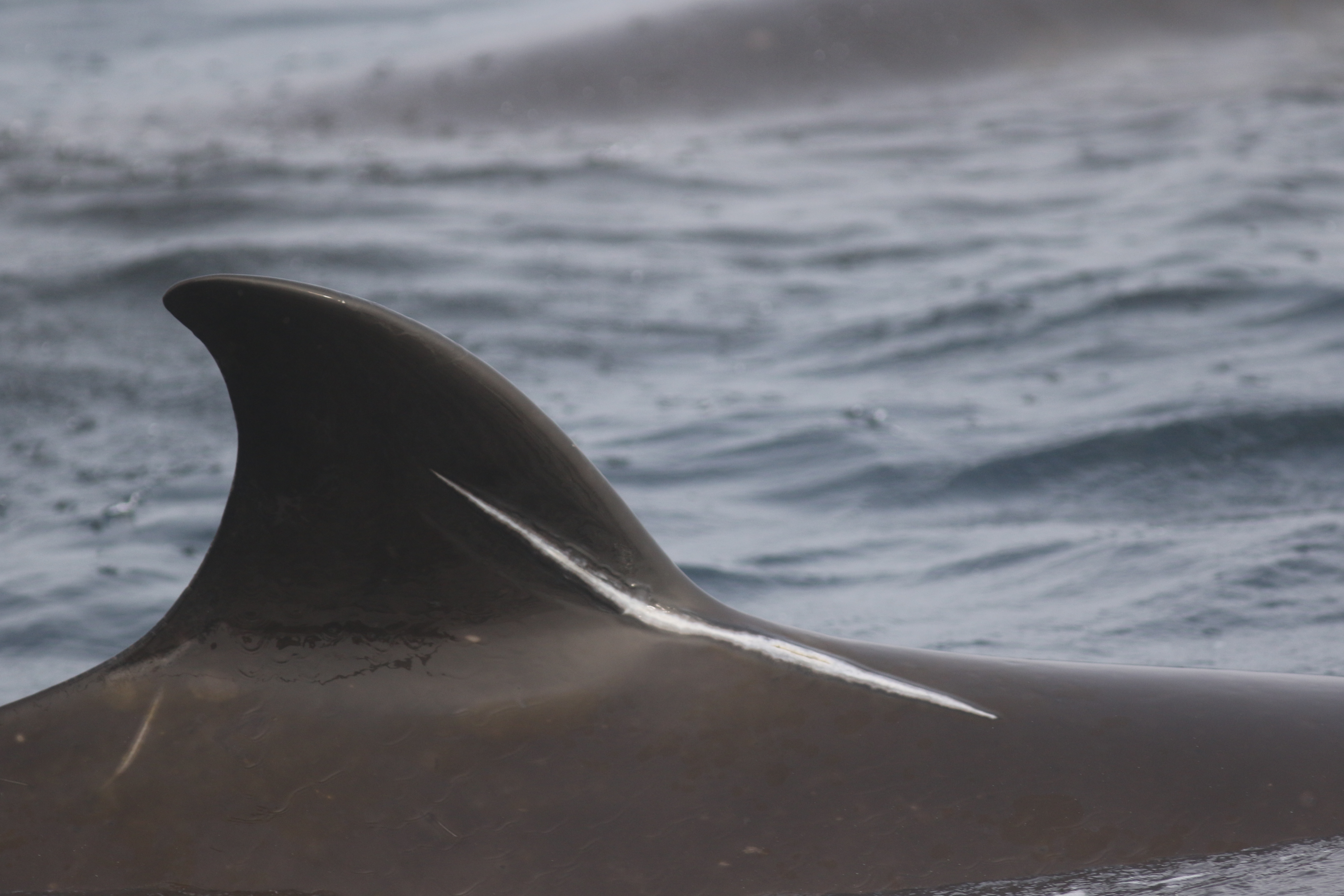
The dorsal fin of a northern bottlenose whale in Newfoundland with a large linear scar visible. Distinct markings are used to identify unique individual whales and estimate their population size.

When physically mature, northern bottlenose whales can reach 9.8 metres (32 ft) in length, smaller than giant beaked whales, and larger than known records of southern bottlenose whales. Their foreheads, or melons, are sexually dimorphic, so that mature males have larger melons, which are flattened or square shaped, while mature females and juveniles have rounder melons. Melon coloration can vary, though it appears the head of most males becomes more white or buff colored with age. The beak is not as long as other beaked whale species, and only mature males have two small teeth, which erupt at the front end of the bottom jaw, but are not easily seen. Females also have teeth, but they are buried in the jaw and do not erupt. The dorsal fin is relatively small, at 30–38 centimetres (12–15 in) and about two thirds of the way back on their bodies. It is falcate (sickle-shaped) and usually pointed. The back is mid-to-dark grey with a lighter underside. They weigh approximately 5,800–7,500 kilograms (12,790–16,530 lb). The oldest recorded age, determined by counting annual growth layers from a tooth in a whaled specimen was 37. Calves have prolonged weaning and nursing continues until juveniles are 3–4 years old. Males become sexually mature between 7 and 11 years old, females between 8 and 12 years old. They live in ocean areas deeper than 6,500 feet (1,981 meter).

== Behaviours ==
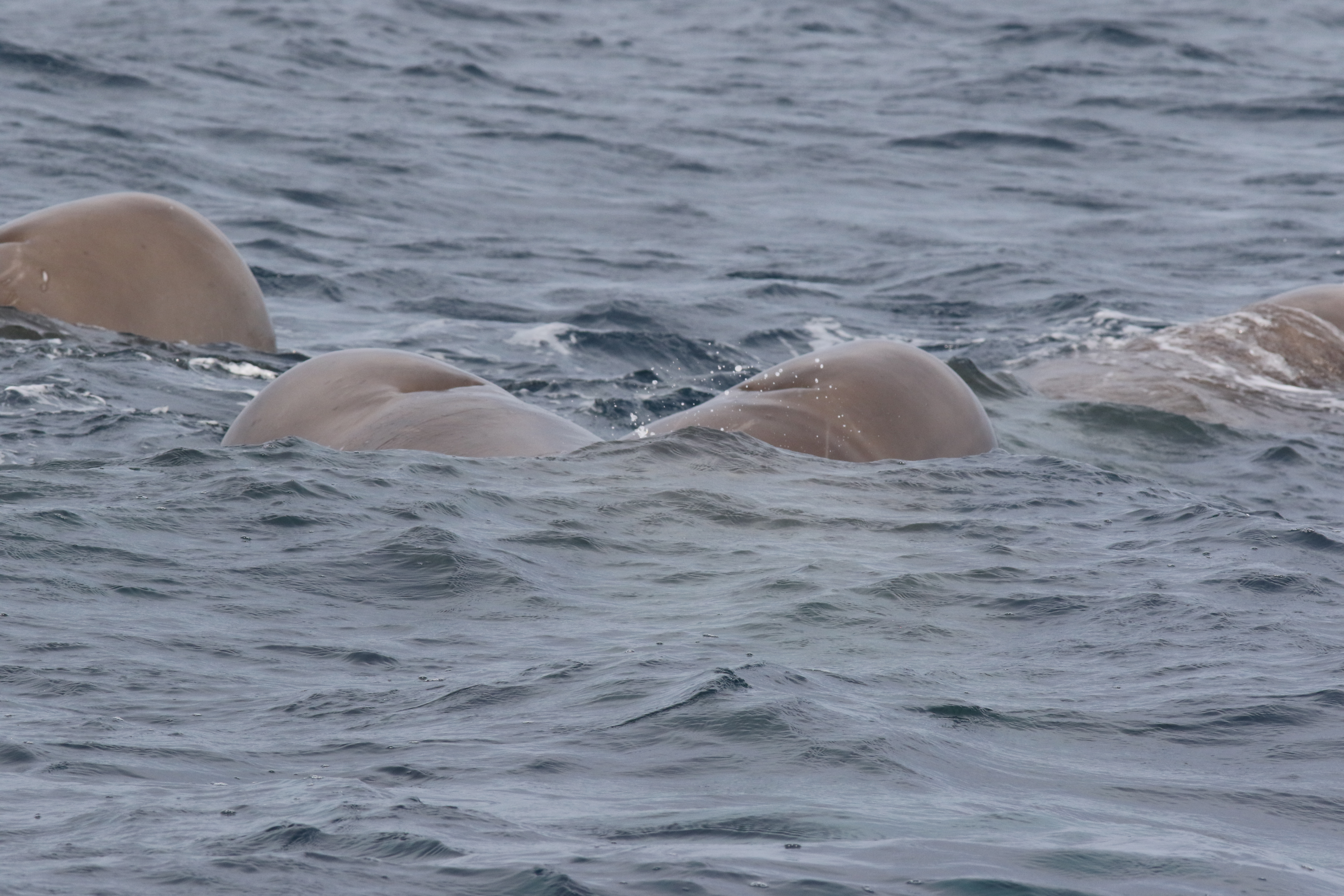
A social group of northern bottlenose whales rest at the surface in the Gully, Nova Scotia, during a Whitehead Lab research expedition in 2017.

Unlike many species of beaked whale, northern bottlenose whales are known to approach and appear curious about vessels, which made them relatively easy targets for whale hunters. However they have demonstrated avoidance to certain sounds such as those emitted by naval sonar in controlled dose response studies.

Underwater recordings have found that northern bottlenose whales produce regular high frequency clicks in click trains, which have a characteristic frequency modulated pulse or "upsweep", commonly found in other species of beaked whales. Northern bottlenose whales live in social groups, and are typically found at the surface in groups of 4 to 20.

== Feeding ==
Northern bottlenose feed mainly on deep water squid, primarily Gonatus fabricii and G. steenstrupi, and bottom fish, such as Greenland halibut. Foraging dives can last an hour or more at depths reaching over 1000 meters. A small percentage of northern bottlenose whales have also been observed feeding on redfish, rabbitfish, spiny dogfish, and skate. Other recorded prey include Taonius pavo, Brachioteuthid squid, vampire squid, Teuthowenia megalops, prawns, sea cucumbers, common ling, echinoderms, and Sebastes sp.

== Population and distribution ==
The northern bottlenose whale is endemic to the North Atlantic Ocean and populations are found in the deep (>500 m) cold subarctic waters of the Davis Strait, the Labrador Sea, the Greenland Sea and the Barents Sea, but can range as far south as Newfoundland and Nova Scotia. As of 2017, the population in the North East Atlantic is estimated to be between 10,000 and 45,000. However their population number is very poorly understood.

"The Gully", a large submarine canyon east of Nova Scotia, is the home of the "Scotian Shelf" population of 164 whales, currently listed under Canada's Species at Risk Act as endangered. This population is the focus of a long-term research project conducted by the Whitehead Lab, at Dalhousie University since 1988.

In 1976 the Scientific Committee of the International Whaling Commission identified a single population across the North Atlantic. In 2011 COSEWIC determined that there are two populations off eastern Canada (Scotian Shelf and Labrador-Davis Strait Designated Units), which recent studies have confirmed are genetically distinct from each other. Individual northern bottlenose whales have also been sighted off the Azores and Canary Islands.

=== Extant (resident) as per IUCN Redlist November 2020 ===
Canada; Faroe Islands; France; Germany; Greenland; Iceland; Ireland; Netherlands; Norway; Portugal; Spain; Svalbard and Jan Mayen; Sweden; United Kingdom; United States

=== Presence Uncertain as per IUCN Redlist November 2020 ===
Denmark; Mauritania; Morocco; Russian Federation; Western Sahara

On 20 January 2006, a female northern bottlenose whale was spotted in Central London in the River Thames. The River Thames whale reached as far up river as Albert Bridge. She was moved onto a barge and rescuers hoped to take her out to sea, but she died following a convulsion on 21 January during its rescue. Her skeleton is now in the Natural History Museum in London.

There was another sighting on 6 August 2019 at Loch Linnhe, a sea loch located off the West coast of Scotland. At the time it was thought to be searching for food in the area. There have been 21 previous live sightings of the northern bottlenose whale in Scotland since 2000. It is speculated that these whales may migrate to north west European shelf waters in the summertime.

On 1 October 2020 a rescue group ushered a group of northern bottlenose whales out of Loch Long, north of Glasgow, it is speculated that these whales moved to shallow water in response to a military sonar exercises.

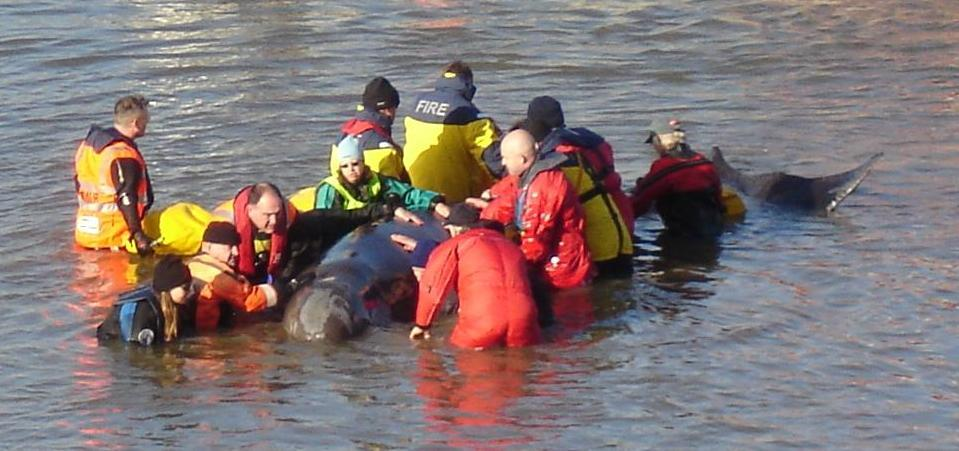
A bottlenose whale - the Thames whale - being calmed by rescuers attempting to save it, 2006

== History of discovery ==
It was first described by Johann Reinhold Forster in 1770, basing the name on the "bottle-nosed whales" seen by Pehr Kalm in his Travels into North America, and on Thomas Pennant's 1766 description of Samuel Dale's "bottle-head whale" found stranded above a bridge in Maldon, Essex, in 1717. The specific name ampullatus is from the Latin ampulla, a flask. The whale was also sometimes known as the doegling, from the Faroese døglingur.

== Conservation ==
Prior to the beginning of whaling, it is estimated that there were upwards of 100,000 northern bottlenose whales in the North Atlantic. Between 1850 and 1973, commercial hunting of the species, focused on populations found off Norway, Iceland, Greenland and Labrador, greatly reduced their numbers across their range. Current conservation concerns include threats from human activities such as disturbance related to offshore oil and gas developments and naval sonar, as well as entanglement in fishing gear, pollution, ingestion of plastic and ecosystem shifts related to climate change.

The International Whaling Commission designated the northern bottlenose whale as a protected stock in 1977 and set a zero catch quota. Northern bottlenose whales are still killed in the Faroe Islands. Faroese regulations only allow the killing of bottlenose whales which have beached themselves and cannot be driven out again. Long term statistics indicate that the most frequent beachings are in the villages of Hvalba and Sandvík on Suðuroy.

The northern bottlenose whale is listed under Canada's Species at Risk Act as endangered, as near threatened under the IUCN red list and on Appendix II of the Convention on the Conservation of Migratory Species of Wild Animals (CMS). In addition, the northern bottlenose whale is covered by the Agreement on the Conservation of Small Cetaceans of the Baltic, North East Atlantic, Irish and North Seas (ASCOBANS).

The northern bottlenose whale has among the lowest known mitochondrial diversity of any cetacean. Due to their low genetic diversity and slow reproductive rate, recovery of their populations may be vulnerable to human stressors and stochastic events.

== See also ==
- List of cetaceans
