= Slippery the Sea Lion =

Escaped California sea lion

Slippery the Sea Lion was a California sea lion (Zalophus californianus) who in June 1958 escaped from a marine mammal park in London, Ontario, Canada. The animal swam down the Thames to Lake St. Clair, and down the Detroit River to Lake Erie, finally being caught in Sandusky Bay near Sandusky, Ohio, US, by employees of the Toledo Zoo after 10 days. The escape and subsequent sightings generated a considerable media frenzy, which was exploited by the owners of Storybook Gardens, the sea lion's home. Rumours persisted for decades that park employees had planned the escape as a publicity stunt. A "custody dispute" staged by the Storybook and Toledo parks may have contributed to the impression. He later died in January 1967.

== See also ==
- Tama-chan
