= Pan Am (disambiguation) =

Pan Am was the largest American international airline, in existence from 1927 to 1991.

Pan Am or PAN AM may also refer to:

== Transportation and communications ==
- Pan Am (1996–1998), a second airline founded by new investors
- Pan Am Systems, the holding company that is parent to:
  - Pan Am (1998–2004), a third airline established under the same brand
  - Pan Am (2026) a planned airline utilizing the Pan Am name
  - Boston-Maine Airways, sister company to this airline, which operated service under the Pan Am Clipper Connection brand
  - Pan Am Railways, formerly known as Guildford Rail System
  - Pan Am Southern, a joint venture of Pan Am Railways and Norfolk Southern
- Pan-American Highway, a near-continuous vehicle route stretching from Alaska to Argentina
- PAN AM (cable system), a submarine telecommunications cable system

== Entertainment, music, and sports ==
- Fly Pan Am, a Canadian experimental rock band
  - Fly Pan Am (album), 1999
- Pan Am (band), a New Zealand rock band
- Pan Am (TV series), an American television periodic drama series centered on the original Pan American World Airways in the 1960s
- Pan American Games, a quadrennial sporting competition amongst the countries of the Western Hemisphere, held between Olympic Games

== See also ==
- Pam Ann
- Panam (disambiguation)
- Panamanian American
- Panem, fictional world for The Hunger Games series
