= Panar (Kundapura) =

Community found in Karnataka

The Panar (singular Pana) are a community found mainly in various districts of Karnataka including Kundapura Taluk and Udupi District, India.

The Panar are classified as a scheduled caste by the government of Karnataka. They are Kannada-speaking and show expertise in singing paddanas (folk songs), mainly in their native Kannada, and also in Tulu languages.

== Origin and Etymology ==
They claim to have originated from the Tulu-speaking Nalike/Panar of Tulunadu region of Karnataka. The name "pana" comes from the word "pan" which means "song" and Panan of Kerala, who are also called panar in Kerala are by and large identical with this caste. The Panan caste is classified as a scheduled caste in Kerala state.

== Chikku cult ==
The Panar community are specialised in performing a religious cult devoted to Chikku, a group of spirits, by singing folk songs combined with dance, which are spirits widely believed and prayed to by common people in coastal districts. The songs sung by the Panar community in the Kannada language are generally related to the Siri Paddana songs of the Tulu language.

They also perform bhootha nruthya which is similar to the "spiritual dance" practiced by the Panan community of Tamil Nadu and Kerala. In Tamil Nadu, the women bards and dancers belonging to the "Panar" community were called "viraliyar" as mentioned in Sangam literature.

== See also ==
- Tamil Panar
