= Tamil Panar =

The Tamil Panar (or Pāṇar, பாணர்) were an ancient musical community of the Tamil area in India, attested from the classical Sangam texts onwards through medieval inscriptions. They sang their songs to the accompaniment of the yāl harp. In fact medieval inscriptions present evidence for their performing Sanskrit drama and for singing and training temple dancers in hindu temples. As Palaniappan states therein: "What is interesting about the traditional views regarding the social status of the Pāṇars is that they were not informed by any real data on the Pāṇars actually living in Tamil Nadu during medieval times. Such real data are indeed available to us from Tamil inscriptions, which present a drastically different picture of the social status of the Pāṇars".

== Notable personages ==
- Tiru Nilakanta Yazhpanar (7th century CE)
- Thiruppaan Alvar (8–9th century CE)

== See also ==
- Panar (Kundapura), a modern-day community of Karnataka
