= British Divers Marine Life Rescue =

United Kingdom charity organisation

- Formation: 1988; 38 years ago
- Registration no.: 803438
- Legal status: Charity
- Purpose: Marine life rescue
- Website: bdmlr.org.uk

British Divers Marine Life Rescue (BDMLR) is a British charity established in 1988 and is a frontline marine mammal response organisation. It uses a network of trained volunteers around the country to respond to marine mammals potentially in need of assistance via a public 24hr hotline and callout system. The organisation's main areas of operation are in the United Kingdom and its territorial waters; however, the charity has received requests from Canada, the Falkland Islands, Kenya, Ireland, Italy, Kazakhstan, Malta and Abu Dhabi.

BDMLR has developed a Marine Mammal Medic training program and has trained over 20,000 medics worldwide. To complement the Marine Mammal Medic training program, BDMLR has also produced a Marine Mammal Medic Handbook for stranded cetaceans. The organisation specialises primarily in pinniped (seals) and cetacean (porpoises, dolphins and whales) rescue, however they will also respond to stranded sea turtles, sharks, oiled sea birds and large whales entangled at sea.

In 2008 BDMLR received training from the Provincetown Centre for Coastal Studies (PCCS) in Maine in the United States of America, on how to rescue entangled large free swimming whales, and in 2013 adapted these techniques to form the BDMLR Large Whale Disentanglement Team (LWDT).

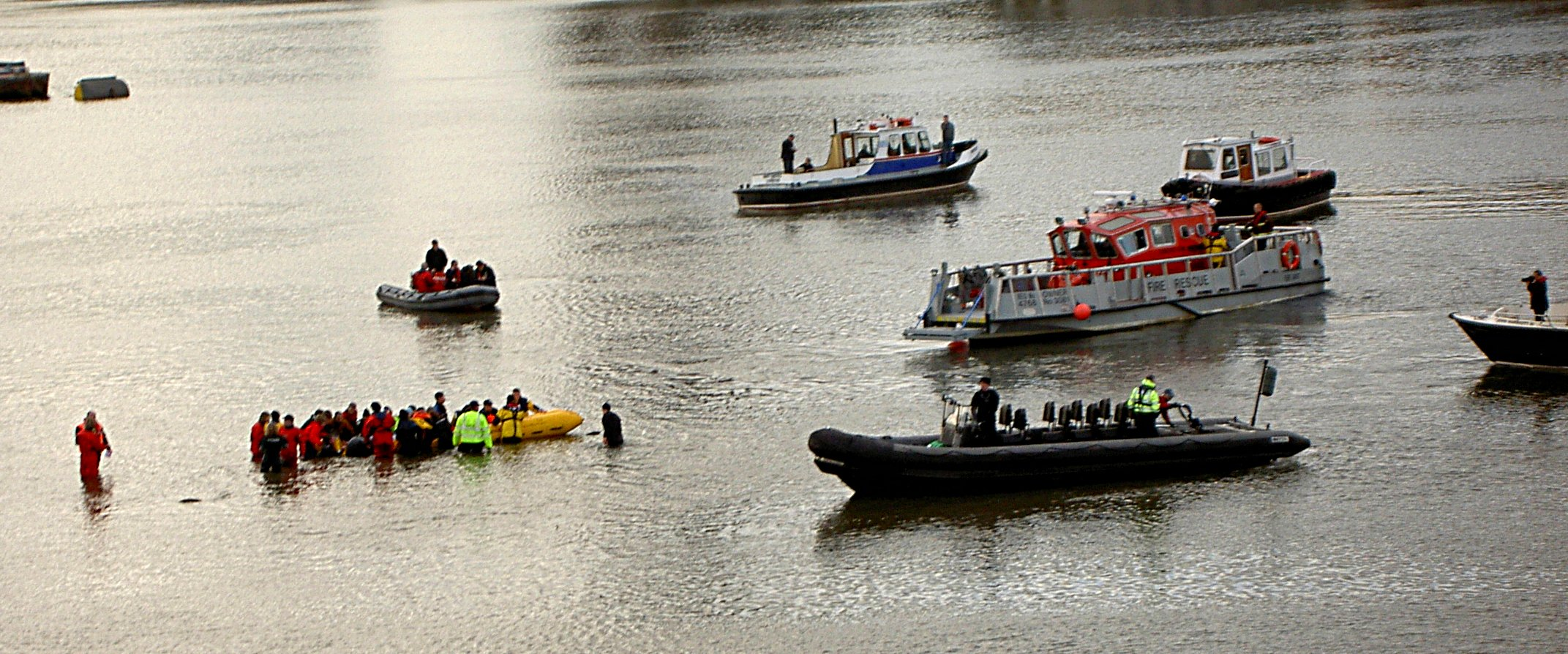
BDMLR volunteers led the response to a stranded northern bottlenose whale in London in January 2006.

The organization received media attention in January 2006 due to its response to Willy, a northern bottlenose whale that became disorientated and later stranded after swimming up the River Thames into central London. A large operation began on the morning of Saturday 21 January and lasted until the evening when an attempt was made to carry the whale back to sea by barge. The whale died on route.

BDMLR has participated in or led rescue efforts that were launched to save either mass stranded pilot whales or pilot whales in danger of mass stranding at Loch Carnan in South Uist on the Outer Hebrides of Scotland in 2010, at Loch Carnan in South Uist on the Outer Hebrides of Scotland in 2011, at the Kyle of Durness on the North West Corner of the Highlands of Scotland in 2011, at Pittenweem in Fife on the East Coast of Scotland in 2012, at Portmahomack and Dornoch Point on the East Coast of the Highlands of Scotland in 2013 and Staffin Island on the West Coast of Scotland in 2015. In 2018, the BDMLR also took part in monitoring Benny, a beluga whale who had been sighted foraging in the Thames Estuary, and in 2021 managed Wally the walrus during his time at the Isles of Scilly where he unintentionally damaged unmanned dinghies by attempting to haul out on them.

On 21 November 2026 a stranded dolphin, at Broughton Bay on the Gower peninsula, Wales, was given first aid by the BDMLR and successfully returned to the sea.

BDMLR opened a purpose-built permanent seal hospital in Cornwall in September 2021. The facility is managed by a vet and supported by volunteer medics to provide care for up to ten seal pups. The centre is also used for trainings.

The charity also supports conservation goals around wildlife disturbance, pollution and climate change. It is a founding member of the Marine Animal Rescue Coalition.
