= Paňa =

Paňa Nemespann
- Municipality
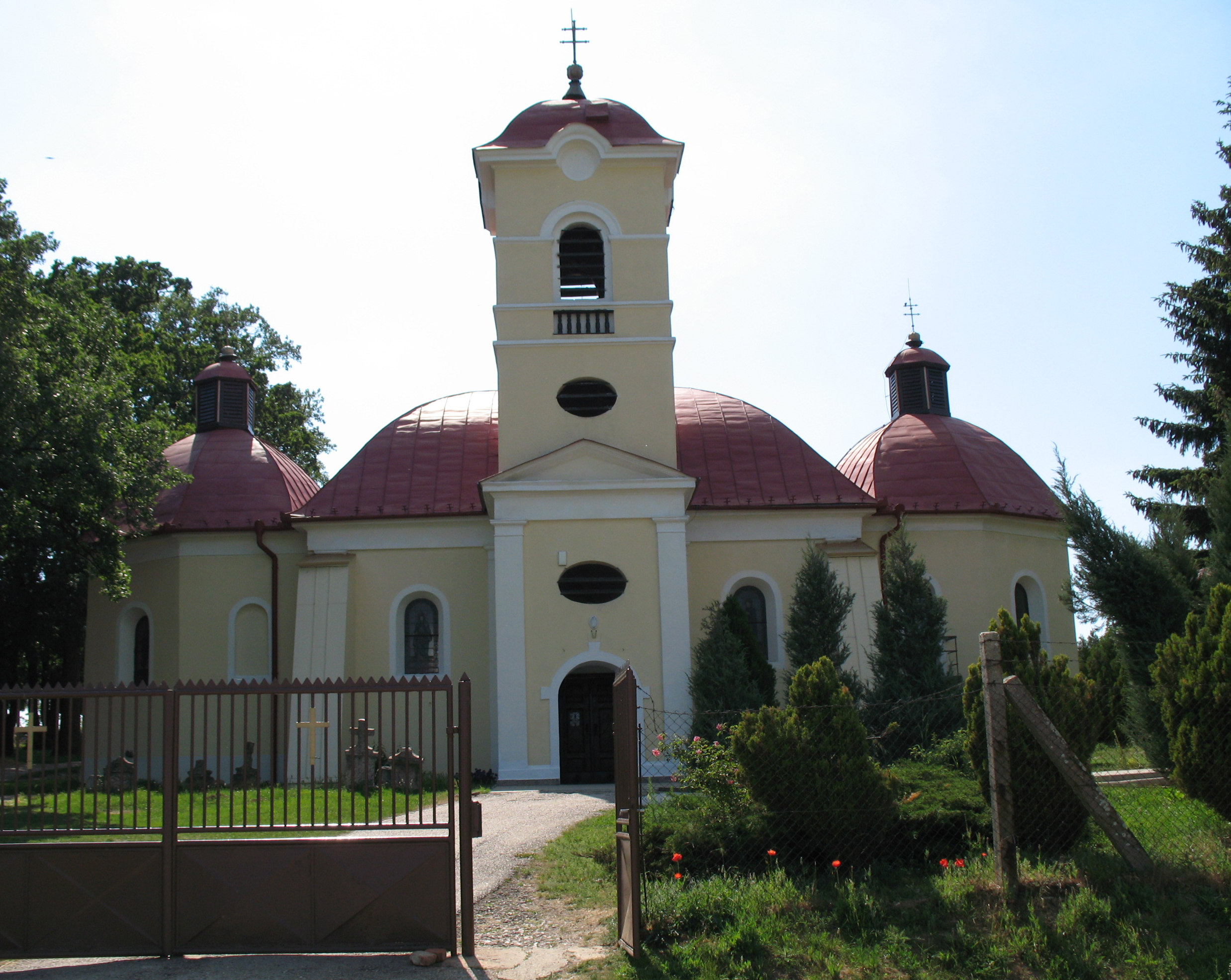

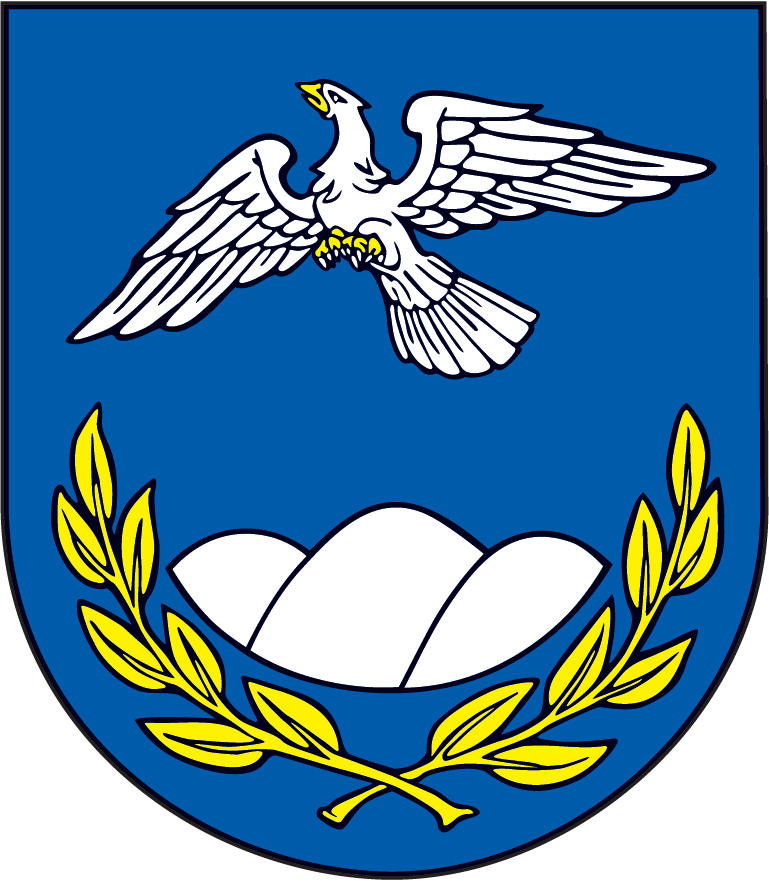
- Flag Coat of arms

- Location of Paňa in the Nitra Region Location of Paňa in Slovakia
- Coordinates: 48.23°N 18.23°E
- Country: Slovakia
- Region: Nitra Region
- District: Nitra District
- First mentioned: 1239

Government
  - Mayor: Milan Korenči

Area
  - Total: 11.26 km^{2} (4.35 sq mi)
- Elevation: 178 m (584 ft)

Population (2025)
  - Total: 431
- Time zone: UTC+1 (CET)
  - Summer (DST): UTC+2 (CEST)
- Postal code: 951 05
- Area code: +421 37
- Vehicle registration plate (until 2022): NR
- Website: www.obecpana.eu

Paňa (Hungarian: Nemespann) is a village and municipality in the Nitra District in western central Slovakia, in the Nitra Region.

== History ==
In historical records the village was first mentioned in 1239 (in form Poonh). After the Mongolian invasion of Hungarian Kingdom in 1241 the next preserved written mention is from year 1285. From preserved written sources it's clear that the village was property of the archdiocese of Esztergom. The village was one of the villages of Sedes de Verebel et Sancti Georgii, where lived church nobility serving the archbishop.

The noblemen from the village also fought in the Battle of Párkány as part of Hungarian forces (in banderium of archbishop) against the Turkish forces. The list of fallen heroes from Paňa is maybe the first detailed list of fallen men from one place in history of Central Europe.

The south part of village was known as Žigárd. The first preserved historical mention is older than of the village, it's from 1156 and 1232. In later period it was used as vineyard, but in 1970's it was destroyed. The Chapel of Saint Urban from 1862/1863 was also destroyed.

The Church of All Saints was built in 1722. The tower is from 1847. The church was damaged by earthquake at Kúty in 1906. The new inner painting of the building is from 1932. The frescoes are work of Hungarian painter Edmund (Ödön) Massányi. The Rieger organ is from 1933. The side altars are maybe older than the church itself.

== Geography ==
The municipality lies at an altitude of 178 metres (584 ft) and covers an area of 11.26 km^{2} (4.35 sq mi) (2025).

== Population ==
Population statistic (10 years)
Year	1995	2005	2015	2025
Count	298	320	373	431
Difference		+7.38%	+16.56%	+15.54%

Population statistic
Year	2024	2025
Count	421	431
Difference		+2.37%

It has a population of 431 people (31 December 2025).

=== Ethnicity ===
Census 2021 (1+ %)
Ethnicity	Number	Fraction
Slovak	367	93.62%
Hungarian	18	4.59%
Not found out	10	2.55%
Czech	5	1.27%
Total	392	

In year 2021 was 392 people by ethnicity 367 as Slovak, 18 as Hungarian, 10 as Not found out, 5 as Czech, 2 as Other, 1 as Romani and 1 as Rusyn.

Note on population: The difference values of population numbers in the table "Population statistic" and in the sections "Ethnicity" & "Religion" is caused by the use of various statistical methods.

In 1919 Czechoslovak census from 730 people 486 Hungarian, 220 Slovak, 18 German lived in Paňa.

The Jewish community in the village was never bigger than 25 people in the village until their deportation to concentration camps in the second world war.

=== Religion ===
Census 2021 (1+ %)
Religion	Number	Fraction
Roman Catholic Church	283	72.19%
None	82	20.92%
Not found out	14	3.57%
Total	392	

In year 2021 was 392 people by religion 283 from Roman Catholic Church, 82 from None, 14 from Not found out, 3 from Ad hoc movements, 2 from Old Catholic Church, 2 from Christian Congregations in Slovakia, 2 from Greek Catholic Church, 1 from Calvinist Church, 1 from Eastern Orthodox Church, 1 from Other and 1 from Evangelical Church.

== People ==
- Károly Kossovich lawyer and member of MTA, Tivadar Szentkereszty teacher and ethnographer, László Czobor vicecomes and representative and others had family relationship with the village.
- István Zsittnyan Hungarian teacher, cultural organizator taught her.
- Alajos Bogyó actor, opera singer and director was born here in 1834.
- Gyula Agárdy piarist teacher, caricaturist was born here in 1895.
- Jenő Csiffáry teacher and lifesaver was born here in 1895.
- Sándor Csuthy mayor and lifesaver was born here in 1900.
- Ľudovít Vaškovič Czechoslovak deputy minister of finance was born here in 1919.
- László Varsányi teacher was born here in 1921.

== Nature ==
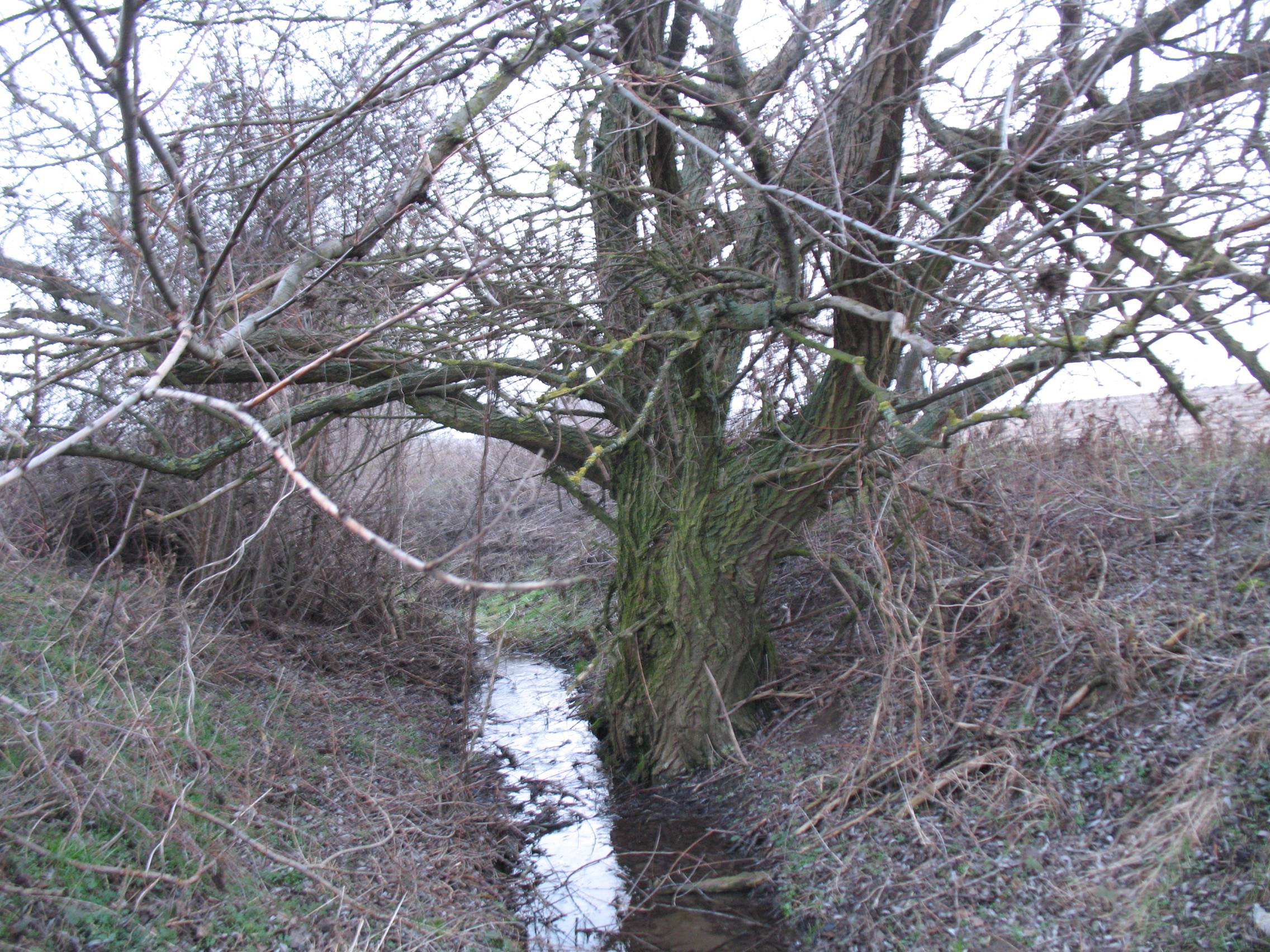
The brook at its source

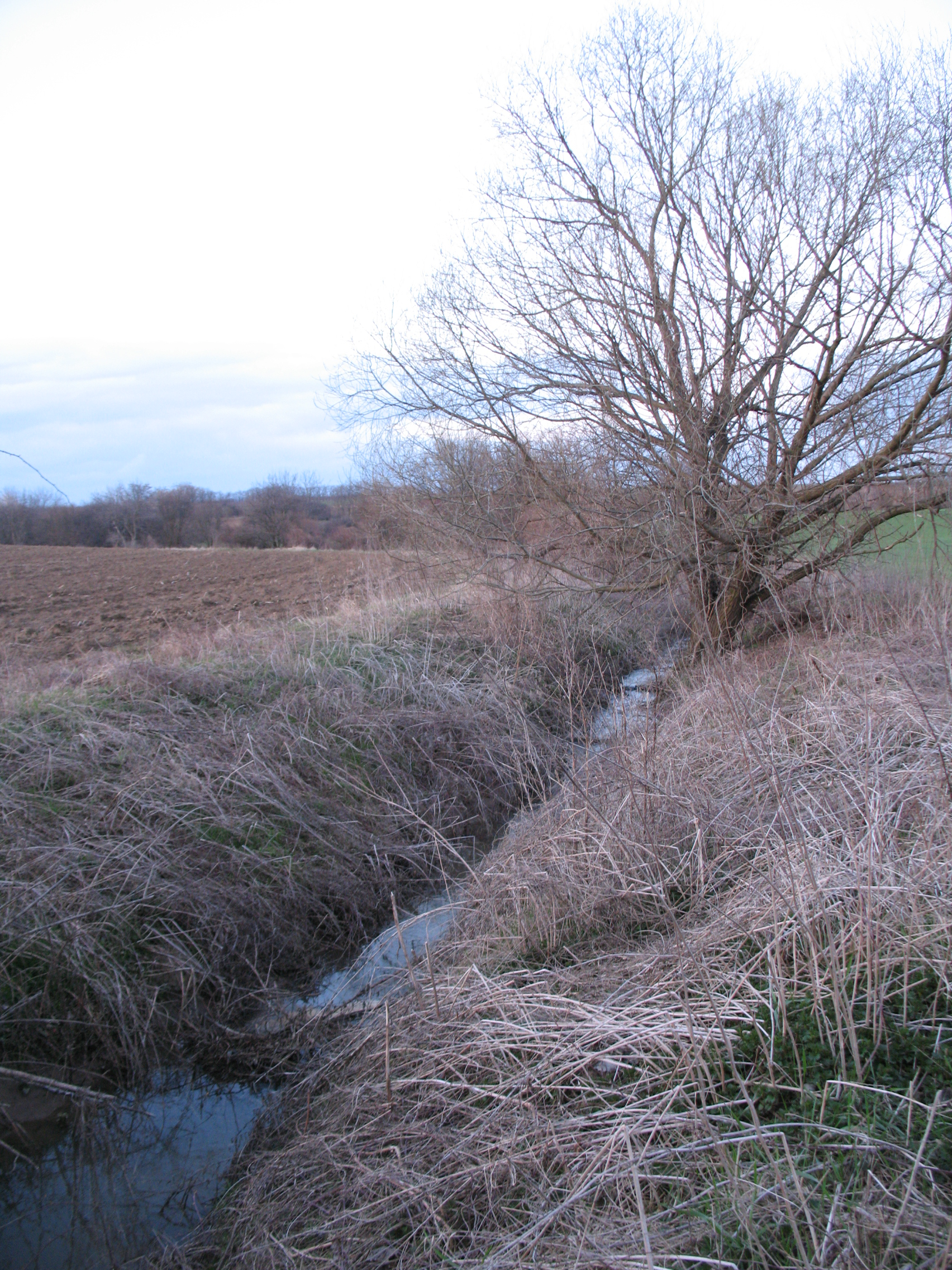
The brook at Žigárd

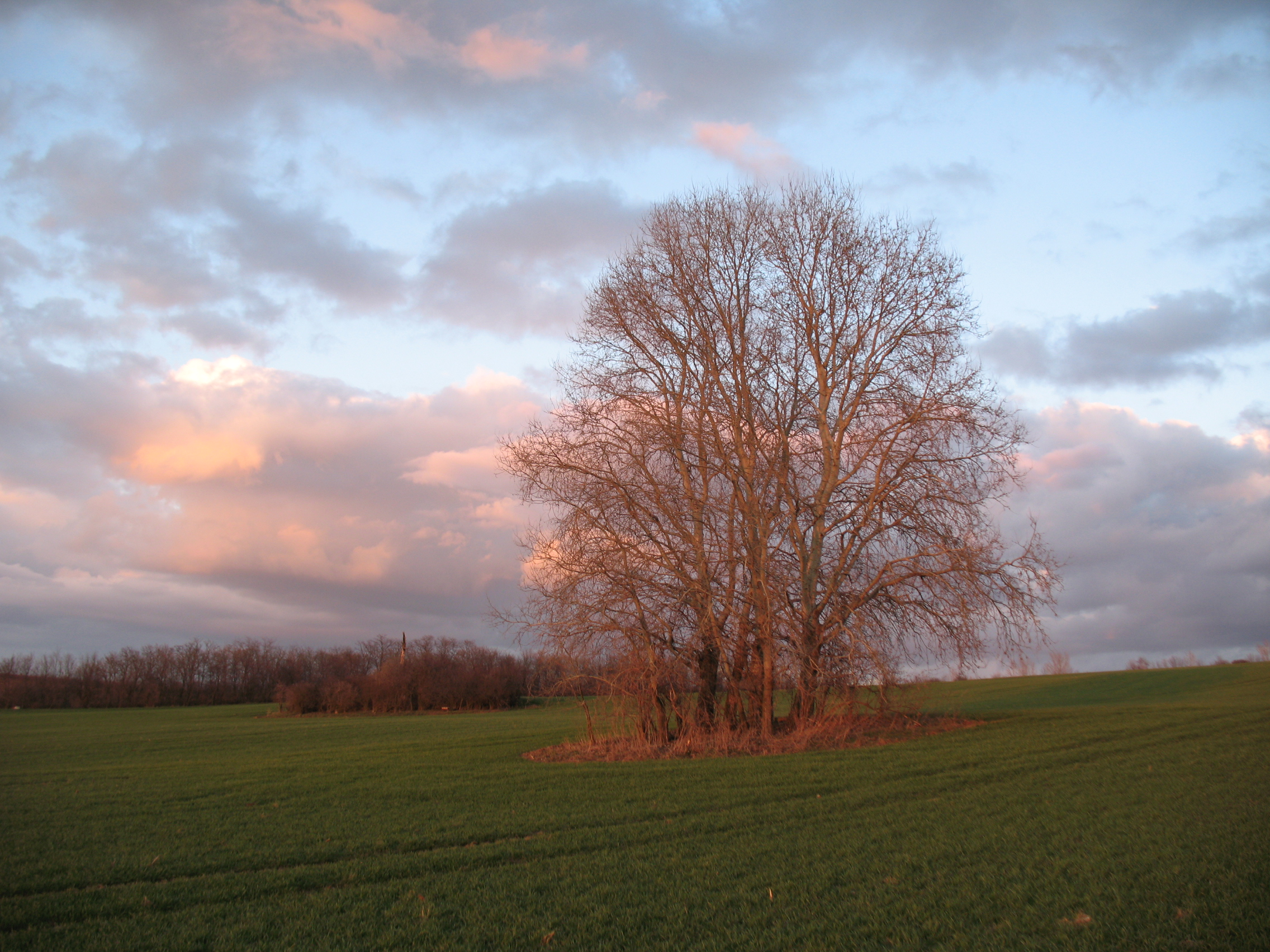
The Saint Urban chapel's ruin and a well

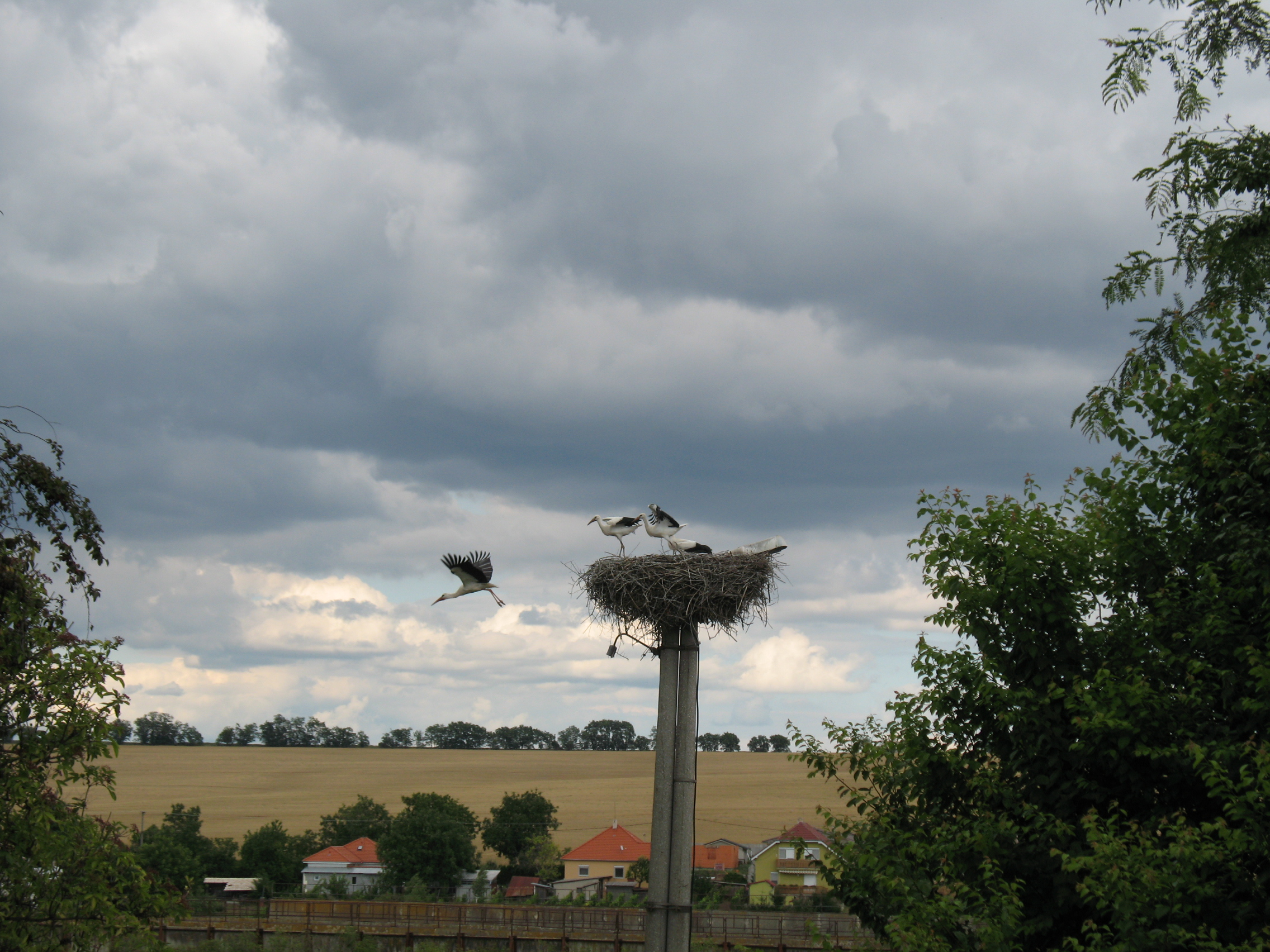
Stork chicks
