= List of Jewish American cartoonists =

This is a list of notable Jewish American cartoonists. For other Jewish Americans, see Lists of Jewish Americans.

== List ==
- Ralph Bakshi, animator (Fritz the Cat, The Lord of the Rings)
- Brian Michael Bendis, comic book writer
- Dave Berg, cartoonist (Mad)
- John Broome
- Al Capp, cartoonist (Li'l Abner)
- Roz Chast, cartoonist (The New Yorker)
- Howard Chaykin, comic book writer
- Daniel Clowes, alternative comics writer (Ghost World)
- Gene Colan, comic book artist (Daredevil)
- Peter David, comics writer and "writer of stuff"
- Will Eisner, comics artist (The Spirit)
- Jules Feiffer, cartoonist
- Lyonel Feininger, cartoonist (Kin-der-Kids)
- Bill Finger, comics artist and creator of Batman
- Max Gaines, founder of EC Comics, pioneering figure in the creation of the modern comic book
- William Gaines, comics artist and Mad founder
- Rube Goldberg, cartoonist
- Jordan B. Gorfinkel, comic book writer (Batman) and cartoonist
- William Gropper, Marxist cartoonist and painter, Die Goldene Medineh
- Milt Gross, Gross Exaggerations
- Allan Heinberg, comic book writer (Young Avengers)
- Herblock, cartoonist; three Pulitzer Prizes
- Harry Hershfield, cartoonist (Abie the Agent, Desperate Desmond)
- Al Hirschfeld, caricaturist
- Nicole Hollander, cartoonist
- Al Jaffee, cartoonist (Mad)
- Bob Kane, comics artist (Batman)
- Gil Kane, comics artist (Green Lantern)
- Ted Key, cartoonist and writer
- Jack Kirby, comics artist and writer (Captain America, Fantastic Four, Hulk, Fourth World (comics))
- Neil Kleid, cartoonist, graphic designer
- Aline Kominsky-Crumb, cartoonist (Dirty Laundry)
- Adam Kubert, comics artist
- Joe Kubert, comics artist
- Harvey Kurtzman, comics artist and Mad editor
- Mell Lazarus, cartoonist (Momma, Miss Peach)
- Stan Lee, comics writer (co-creator of Spider-Man, co-creator of X-Men, Hulk, Fantastic Four, and Avengers)
- Stan Mack, cartoonist
- Robert Mankoff
- Michael Netzer, American-Israeli artist best known for his comic book work for DC Comics and Marvel Comics in the 1970s, as well as for his online presence.
- Eli Valley, cartoonist and author best known for Diaspora Boy.
- Martin Nodell, comics artist (Green Lantern)
- Diane Noomin, comics artist (
- Nina Paley, cartoonist, animator and free culture activist (Sita Sings the Blues).
- Harvey Pekar, comics writer (American Splendor)
- Trina Robbins, comics writer
- Joe Shuster, comics artist (Superman)
- Jerome Siegel, comics artist (Superman)
- Shel Silverstein, cartoonist
- Art Spiegelman, comics writer (Maus)
- Mat Tonti, comics writer ("The Book of Secrets")
- Alan Weiss, comics artist and writer

== See also ==
- The Amazing Adventures of Kavalier & Clay (2000 novel)
- List of documentary films about comics
