= Can You Top This? (TV series) =

American TV comedy series (1950–1951)

- Genre: Comedy
- Directed by: Roger Bower and Marshall Diskin
- Presented by: Ward Wilson

Production
- Producer: Ed Webber
- Running time: 30 minutes

Original release
- Network: ABC
- Release: October 3, 1950 – March 26, 1951

Related
- Can You Top This? (radio program)

Can You Top This? is an American television comedy show that was broadcast on ABC from October 3, 1950, to March 26, 1951.

== Format ==
Can You Top This? was a video version of the radio program with the same name. Jokes sent in by listeners were read to the audience, after which members of a panel attempted to provide a funnier joke about the same topic. A laugh meter was used to determine which joke was the funniest in each round. Ward Wilson was the master of ceremonies. The panelists were Peter Donald, "Senator" Ford, Harry Hershfield, and Joe Laurie Jr. and Charles Stark was the announcer.

== Production ==
Maiden Wine sponsored Can You Top This? episodes originated via WJZ-TV from the Elyssea Theater on West 58th Street in New York Ford and Ed Webber were the producers while Roger Bower and Marshall Diskin were the directors. The show initially was broadcast from 9:30 to 10 p.m. Eastern Time on Tuesdays and in December 1950 it was moved to Mondays from 8 to 8:30 p.m. E.T.

== Critical response ==
A review in The New York Times indicated that viewers deserved more than what they saw in the initial episode of the TV version of Can You Top This? The review said the show basically "was the old radio show done in front of cameras" with little attention given to the visual component of the program. It concluded, "A television viewer has a right to be more than a member of radio's studio audience."

== 1970 version ==
A version of Can You Top This? was syndicated in 1969-1970. Wink Martindale was the initial host but Dennis James replaced him. Morey Amsterdam was the only regular member of the panel with Richard Dawson and Dick Gautier as the joke tellers. Amsterdam and Perry Cross were the producers and Martin Kane was the director.
