= Pereira & Luckman =

Architectural firm in Los Angeles, California, USA

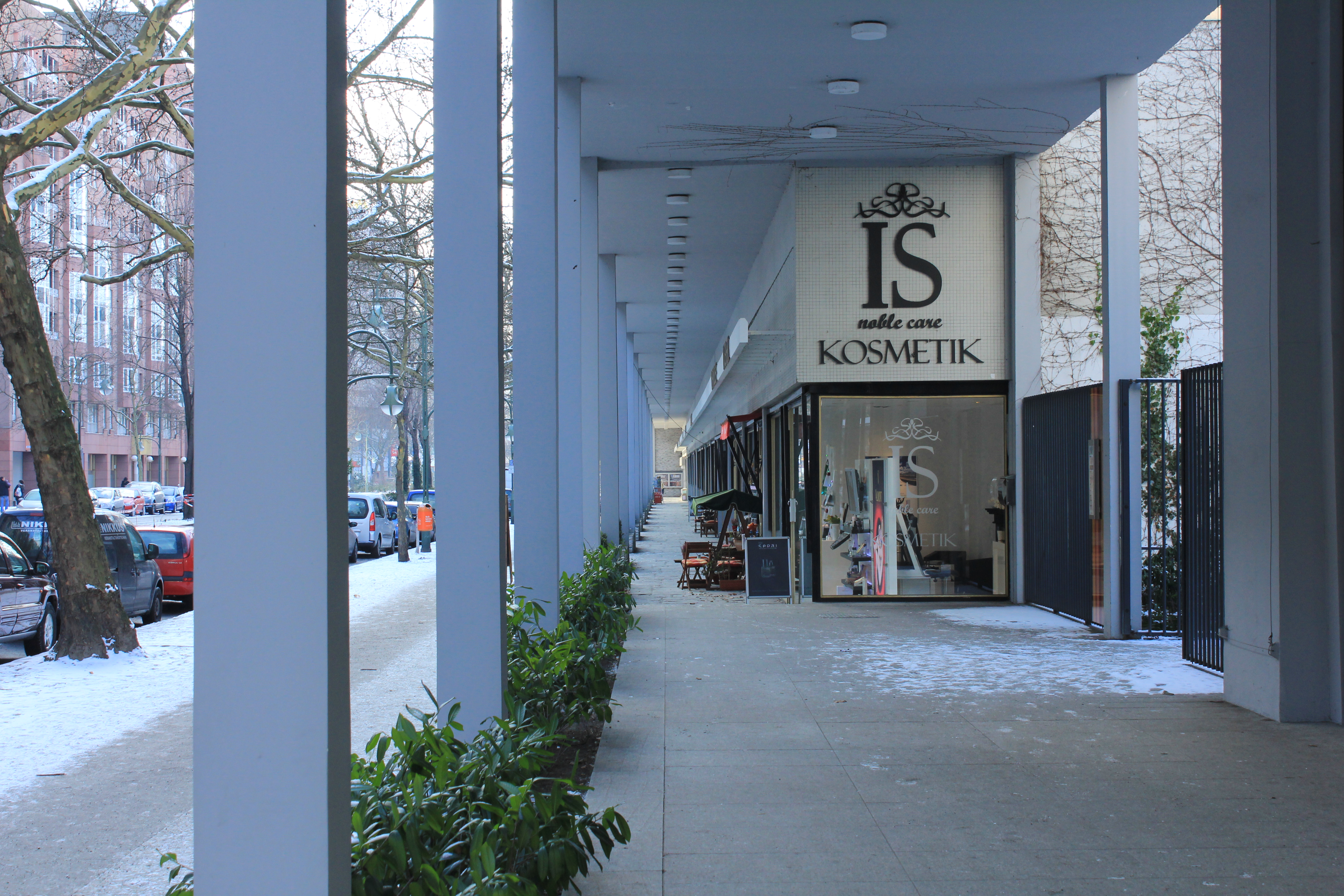

Practice information
- Key architects: Charles Luckman, William Pereira

Significant works and honors
- Buildings: Theme Building; Disneyland Hotel

Pereira & Luckman was a Los Angeles, California architectural firm that partners Charles Luckman and William Pereira founded in Los Angeles in 1950. They had been classmates at the University of Illinois’ School of Architecture and had each become prominent thereafter, Pereira designing cinemas around the U.S. and a film studio for Paramount Pictures. The partnership eventually employed more than 300 architects.

The firm is notable for having designed such landmarks in the Los Angeles area as the Theme Building at Los Angeles International Airport, CBS Television City and several J. W. Robinson's department stores, but also work for NASA, Hilton Hotels and many others. It employed Paul Williams.

== Works ==
- 1951
  - Farmers & Stockmen's Bank, Phoenix, Arizona
  - Gibraltar Savings & Loan Headquarters, Beverly Hills, California
  - Robinson's department store, Beverly Hills (demolished)
  - Robinson's department store, Pasadena, California
- 1952
  - Avco Research Center, Wilmington, Massachusetts
  - Beverly Hills Hotel Addition, Beverly Hills
  - Doheny Office Building, Beverly Hills
  - Hilton Hotels headquarters, Beverly Hills
  - Lear Industrial plant, Santa Monica
  - Luke Air Force Base, Phoenix, Arizona
- 1953
  - CBS Television City, Los Angeles
  - Western Hydraulics plant, Van Nuys, California
- 1954
  - Electronics and Radio Propagation Research Laboratories, Camp Pendleton, Oceanside, California
  - KEYT Television Station, Santa Barbara, California
  - KTTV Television Station, Los Angeles
  - National Bureau of Standards building, Boulder, Colorado
  - Santa Rosa Hall - Dormitory, University of California, Santa Barbara
  - Seagram Building, New York City (early designs)
  - United States Navy training facility, San Diego, California
  - Wadsworth General Hospital, Veteran's Administration, Los Angeles
  - Western Hydraulics Plant 2, Van Nuys, California
  - William H. Block Department Store, Indianapolis
  - WSBT Television Station, South Bend, Indiana
  - Marineland of the Pacific, Rancho Palos Verdes, California
- 1955
  - Dormitories, Music and Science Buildings, Occidental College, Los Angeles
  - Jet Production and Test Center, Palmdale, California
  - Service Bureau Office Building, Los Angeles
  - Whittier Downs Shopping Center (demolished), Santa Fe Springs, California
- 1956
  - Fallbrook Hospital, Fallbrook, California
  - General Telephone Company Administration Building, Whittier, California
  - Hunter Engineering plant, Riverside, California
  - Prudential Tower, Boston (early designs)
  - Southern California School of Theology, Claremont, California (now Claremont School of Theology)
  - United States Air Force and Naval Bases, Cádiz, Spain
  - Braniff International Airways, Operations and Maintenance Base, Dallas, Texas
- 1957
  - First National Bank, Denver, Colorado
  - Motion Picture Country House and Hospital, Woodland Hills, California
  - Nellis Air Force Base buildings, Nevada
- 1958
  - Beckman Corporation plant, Newport Beach, California
  - Berlin Hilton, Berlin, Germany
  - Bullock's Fashion Square, Santa Ana, California (demolished except for the Bullock's department store, which continues as part of the MainPlace Mall built in site in 1987)
  - Chrysler Sales & Service Training Center, Anaheim, California
  - Convair Astronautics, San Diego, California
  - Disneyland Hotel (California) The original
  - Firestone Tire company headquarters, Los Angeles
  - Ford Aeronutronics, Newport Beach, California (demolished)
  - General Atomic, La Jolla, California
  - Grossmont Hospital, San Diego, California
  - IBM headquarters, Los Angeles
  - Los Angeles International Airport
  - Physical Plant Building B, University of Southern California
  - Robinson's department store, Palm Springs, California
  - Signal Oil & Gas headquarters, Los Angeles
  - Union Oil Center, Los Angeles (now Los Angeles Center Studios)
  - Valley Presbyterian Hospital, Van Nuys, California
- 1959
  - Theme Building LAX (with Paul Williams and Welton Becket)
