= Edward Hastings Ford =

American vaudeville comedian (1887–1970)

- Born: Edward Hastings Fauth; June 13, 1887; Brooklyn, New York, U.S.
- Died: January 27, 1970 (aged 82); Greenport, New York, U.S.
- Other name: "Senator" Ford
- Notable work: Panelist on Stop Me If You've Heard This One (1939-1940); Creator of Can You Top This? (1950-1972)
- Spouse(s): Harriet Fauth Lavinia (m. 1908; died 1957) Louise Grace (m. 1957)
- Parent(s): George Louis Fauth (father); Emma Escher (mother)

Comedy career
- Medium: Improv comedy

There are two reasons why I like radio better than vaudeville. The first reason is that in radio you can stay put, and the second reason is that the weekly stipend is greater. The second reason is the first.

— Edward Hastings Ford

Edward Hastings Ford (June 13, 1887 – January 27, 1970) was a vaudeville comedian who created the radio show Can You Top This?, on which he appeared as the character Senator Ford.

== Early years ==
Ford was born Edward Hastings Fauth in Brooklyn in 1887 and had a sister, Harriet Fauth Lavinia. He dropped out of Manhattan's public school system after the eighth grade. His first job was in photoengraving. He married Hilda Engelhardt (1908–1957).

Ford also pursued an interest in art, as he "obtain[ed] an art schooling and operated an art studio in New York's lower Broadway, doing commercial illustrating."

=== "Senator" Ford ===
A 1943 newspaper article traced the origin of Ford's nickname to a speech he made at New York's Republican Club in the 1910s. The speaker who preceded Ford was future President Warren G. Harding, then a member of the U.S. Senate. Following Harding's remarks, "the toastmaster jocularly referred to Ford as 'Senator' Ford in introducing him to the audience. The title has stuck since."

== Radio ==
Ford became a panelist on a comedy quiz show called Stop Me If You've Heard This One, which ran from October 1939 to March 1940. Shortly after that show ended Ford was inspired to create the similar but far more successful Can You Top This?, which co-starred friends and colleagues Joe Laurie, Jr. and Harry Hershfield. Can You Top This? ran on local radio in New York for two years until being picked up nationally by NBC, where it ran for another twelve years.

There were two television versions of the show, the first version ran on ABC from October 1950 to March 1951; the second, which premiered January 26, 1970 (the day before Ford's death), aired in first-run syndication only eight months.

== Personal life ==
Ford lived in the town of Southold for his entire life.

Ford's first wife Harriet Fauth Lavinia died in 1957. He married Louise Grace July 11, 1957.

== Death ==
Ford died at Eastern Long Island Hospital in Greenport, Suffolk County, New York, on January 27, 1970, of lung cancer and throat cancer.

== Legacy ==
His papers are archived at Stony Brook University.
