= Shopping centers in Santa Fe Springs, California =

Santa Fe Springs, California has been home to two regional malls and one open-air shopping center, anchored by department stores. Today, all three operate as conventional open-air shopping centers.

== Santa Fe Springs Mall / Gateway Plaza ==
Gateway Plaza
- Santa Fe Springs Mall
- Location: Telegraph Road & Carmenita Road; Santa Fe Springs, California
- Coordinates: 33.9400198°N 118.0486143°W
- Opened: 1985
- Closed: 1998
- Floor area: 540,000-square-foot (50,000 m^{2})
- Floors: 1

Santa Fe Springs Mall was a 540,000-square-foot (50,000 m^{2}) regional mall built in 1985, which included a Sears (relocated to Whittwood Mall in 1996) and an 8-screen Mann multicinema. It is now the site of the Gateway Plaza power center, anchored by Target, Ross Dress for Less (formerly OfficeMax and Marshalls), El Super, and Walmart. The shopping center is located at the intersection of Telegraph Road and Carmenita Road.

== Whittier Downs / Santa Fe Springs Marketplace ==
Santa Fe Springs Marketplace
- Whittier Downs Shopping Center
- Location: Washington Boulevard & Norwalk Boulevard; Santa Fe Springs, California
- Coordinates: 33.9729628°N 118.0731365°W
- Opened: 1955
- Closed: 1980s (as Whittier Downs)
- Floor area: 200,000-square-foot (19,000 m^{2})
- Floors: 1

Whittier Downs Shopping Center was a 200,000-square-foot (19,000 m^{2}) shopping center that served the community of West Whittier-Los Nietos, California from the 1950s through the 1980s, anchored by JCPenney. The center is at Washington and Norwalk boulevards and within the city limits of Santa Fe Springs, despite the shopping center's name associated with the adjacent city. Pereira & Luckman were the architects.

The center opened in 1955 with parking for 740 cars. Unusually, shops faced both a pedestrian mall as well as the parking lot.

In the late 1980s, the mall was demolished and the site was redeveloped into the Santa Fe Springs Marketplace, a neighborhood center currently anchored by a Food 4 Less supermarket, O'Reilly Auto Parts, and a Pic 'N' Save Bargains store, which is a revival of the original chain of the same name that eventually converted to Big Lots. The Pic 'N' Save was previously a Rite Aid and its predecessor, Thrifty Drugs.

== Santa Fe Springs Shopping Center / Promenade ==
Santa Fe Springs Promenade
- Santa Fe Springs Shopping Center
- Location: Telegraph Road & Orr and Day Road; Santa Fe Springs, California
- Coordinates: 33.948268°N 118.089395°W
- Opened: 1954
- Floor area: 112,000-square-foot (10,400 m^{2})
- Floors: 2

The former Santa Fe Springs Shopping Center, opened in 1954 with W. T. Grant, Market Basket, and David's Department Store, is now the Santa Fe Springs Promenade, a neighborhood shopping center with 112,000 square feet (10,400 m^{2}) anchored by Dollar Tree (formerly 99 Cents Only Stores). The dedication of a 40-foot-tall sign spelling out "Santa Fe Springs" at the center in 1956 was celebrated with a three-day city festival.
