= Can You Top This? =

1940–1954 radio panel game

- Promotion advertisement for the program
- Genre: Panel game
- Running time: 30 mins.
- Country of origin: United States
- Language: English
- Home station: WOR
- TV adaptations: Can You Top This? (ABC)
- Hosted by: Peter Donald
- Starring: Ward Wilson, Roger Bower and Dennis James
- Created by: "Senator" Edward Hastings Ford
- Recording studio: New York
- Original release: 1940 – 1954
- No. of episodes: ≈36

Can You Top This? is a radio panel game in which comedians told jokes and tried to top one another. The unrehearsed program, sponsored at one point by a papaya-flavored soft drink called Par and later by Colgate-Palmolive, was created by veteran vaudevillian "Senator" Edward Hastings Ford, who claimed he was taking part in a joke session at a New York theatrical club when he conceived the idea. However, the format was quite similar to a prior joke-telling radio series, Stop Me If You've Heard This One (1939–40), which featured Ford and cartoonist Harry Hershfield as panelists. Many jokes involved ethnic humor told in dialect.

Listeners were invited to send in jokes of their own, and an average of 3,000 were submitted per week. Host Peter Donald told the best of these jokes, each one centered on a different topic, while a "laugh meter" took note of the audience reaction on a scale of 0 to 1,000. The "Knights of the Clown Table" – Ford, Hershfield and Joe Laurie Jr. – attempted to outscore the listeners' jokes with some of their own, which sometimes presented an extra challenge as their jokes had to be pertinent to the topic.

Initially, a listener whose joke was read on the program received a guaranteed $2, plus $5 more if the panelists failed to beat it. The prize was later augmented to $11, which was "chopped" by $2 every time the joke was outscored. Those whose jokes were topped by all the panelists received a joke book as a consolation prize. Eventually, audience participants received $10, plus a $5 bonus for each panelist who failed to outscore it with his own joke, for a potential maximum prize of $25. Any ties on the laugh meter between a listener and panelist were broken in the listener's favor. Any submitted joke that earned a perfect 1,000 on the laugh meter was thus guaranteed to win the full $25 for its submitter. Every listener whose joke was used received a phonograph recording of Donald telling it on the air. Those who topped the laugh meter were also sent a "1,000 Club certificate." The panelists claimed that together they knew over 15,000 jokes.

Can You Top This? debuted on New York's WOR radio in 1940. NBC picked up the show in 1942, and it continued 12 more years. Hosts at one time or another included, Ward Wilson, Roger Bower and Dennis James, Wilson took over from original host, Bower, in 1945. When Ford or Donald was unavailable, Wilson filled in on the panel or as the teller of listener jokes, so James acted as emcee.

Laurie died in 1954. In the show's later years, his place on the panel was filled by others, including former New Jersey Governor Harold Hoffman, Fred Hillebrand, and Bert Lytell. In 1954, Wilson once again told jokes on the panel, with Bower reprising his role as emcee.

== Television ==
Can You Top This? made its television debut on ABC on October 3, 1950, but only lasted until March 26, 1951. This version featured Ward Wilson as host and Ford, Hershfield, and Laurie as panelists.

The show was briefly revived in syndication by Four Star Television on January 26, 1970, with Wink Martindale as host and featured Morey Amsterdam as Executive Producer and a regular panelist, but this incarnation lasted just eight months. In this version, one celebrity (such as Dick Gautier, Louie Nye and Richard Dawson) read jokes submitted by viewers, while a group of panelists (such as Amsterdam, Red Buttons, Paul Winchell and Jack Carter) tried to top the viewer's jokes with their own version on the same subject. The viewer earned $25 for having the joke read by the guest, an additional $25 for each panelist who was unable to top the viewer's joke, and $100 and a prize (such as an Ampex audio cassette player) if they topped all three panelists. The 1970 version was recorded at CBS Television City in Hollywood, California. Studios 31, 33, 41 and 43 were used at different times making it one of the few game shows to tape in all four studios at CBS.

A pilot was done in 1986 by Barry and Enright Productions with Jm. J. Bullock, Brad Garrett, Sydney Goldsmith, and Shecky Greene as the comedians and a radio host named Ken Minyard as the host and Charlie O'Donnell announcing. Unlike the 50s and 70s versions, this was taped in color instead of black and white.

== Episode status ==
At least 36 episodes exist of the radio show. Nine episodes exist of the 1970 version; two are held by collectors, while the others are at the UCLA Film and Television Archive.
