= Charles Luckman =

American businessman architect (1909–1999)

- Born: May 16, 1909; Kansas City, Missouri, U.S.
- Died: January 26, 1999 (aged 89); Los Angeles, California, U.S.
- Education: University of Illinois
- Occupation: Architect
- Awards: Order of St. John; Legion of Honor; Order of the Star of Italian Solidarity; Horatio Alger Award; Henry Laurence Gantt Medal
- Practice: Pereira & Luckman (1950–1959)
- Buildings: Theme Building, Prudential Tower, Madison Square Garden, The Forum, Aon Center, Phoenix Symphony Hall, Conoco-Phillips Building
- Projects: Los Angeles International Airport

Charles Luckman (May 16, 1909 – January 26, 1999) was an American businessman, property developer, and architect known for designing landmark buildings in the United States such as the Theme Building, Prudential Tower, Madison Square Garden, and The Forum. He was named the "Boy Wonder of American Business" by Time magazine when president of the Pepsodent toothpaste company in 1939. Through acquisition, he later became president of Lever Brothers. Luckman would later collaborate with William Pereira, in which the two would form their architectural firm, Pereira & Luckman, in 1950. Pereira & Luckman would later dissolve by 1958, parting ways for both himself and Pereira. Luckman would continue successfully with his own firm, Charles Luckman Associates. Luckman retired from the firm, although he would still be present.

Aside from his business and architectural work, Luckman did public work that dates back during World War II. He was appointed on the President's Committee on Civil Rights during the Truman administration, as well as being the chairman of the Citizens Food Committee and the Freedom Train; both of which helped out Europe. As a result of his work in Europe, Luckman was honored with the Order of St. John, Legion of Honor and Order of the Star of Italian Solidarity. Additionally, Luckman was an active supporter of public education.

Luckman died on January 26, 1999, at his home in Los Angeles, California, at the age of 89.

== Early years ==
Charles Luckman was born on May 16, 1909, in Kansas City, Missouri, to an immigrant family, his father came from Germany and his mother from Yugoslavia.

At age nine, he began selling newspapers outside the Muehlebach Hotel in Kansas City at Eleventh and Baltimore. Luckman recalls that, after the second or third week he was working at the newsstand, he asked a woman passing by about what the "pretty lights" hanging down the ceiling were called. She told the young Luckman that they were called chandeliers. He then asked a second question to the same woman on who decided to place them. She responds, "An architect. He designs the hotel and says to put the chandeliers there." Luckman wrote in his memoir, "Right then and there I decided to become an architect."

In 1920, Luckman found work as a stock boy in the men's furnishings department at a Jones Store Company. He later went on as a junior salesman for about a year before moving to various departments over time. There, he learned crucial knowledges in business, which would later help him in the future. When reflecting back, Luckman stated that the most vital lessons he learned from were the result of people, because he had a "natural interest in studying what motivates people."

Luckman attended Kansas City's Northeast High School for all four years. He joined the high school debate team, was elected class president during his senior year, and voted "Most Likely to Succeed; the latter which he detested. Following graduation in 1925, and a stint in a Kansas City Junior Engineering College, he took a job as a draftsman at an architect's office in Chicago. He was awarded a full scholarship to the University of Missouri, but he declined it because the school did not offer a degree in architecture. Instead, Luckman would attend at the University of Illinois where he studied architecture.

Luckman graduated magna cum laude from the University of Illinois in 1931 with a bachelor's degree in architecture. At the same time, Luckman was licensed to practice architecture after being sent a letter from the Illinois Board of Examiners.

== Business career ==
Lacking professional opportunities in architecture as a result of the Great Depression, Luckman joined at Colgate-Palmolive-Peet as a draftsman in the advertising department. He later transferred to sales. Luckman achieved impressive gains in the sales of his company's soap on Chicago's South Side, which earned him a reputation as a superb salesman and set the stage for a remarkable rise in the business world.

In 1935, Luckman became sales manager for Pepsodent, where his marketing techniques were credited with quadrupling profits. This came about when his boss from Colgate became account executive at Albert Lasker's Lord & Thomas advertising agency. He recommended Luckman for sales manager at Pepsodent. When he was 27, Time magazine called him the "boy wonder of American business" in 1937.

By 1938, he was vice-president and general manager of Pepsodent. The next major step in Luckman's career occurred in 1944, when Lever Brothers acquired Pepsodent for $10 million. Luckman continued as president of Pepsodent and became a vice-president of Lever Brothers. In 1946, Luckman became president of Lever Brothers, making him one of the youngest head executives in the country. This earned him a second cover on Time's June 10, 1946, issue. In 1950, Luckman left Lever Brothers. The exact reason or reasons for his departure remain unclear, but Lever had failed to equal its rival Procter & Gamble in such areas as the marketing of synthetic detergents, and by 1949 Lever Brothers was in the red. It may have also been motivated by Luckman's desire to get back into architecture.

== Architecture ==
=== Pereira and Luckman ===
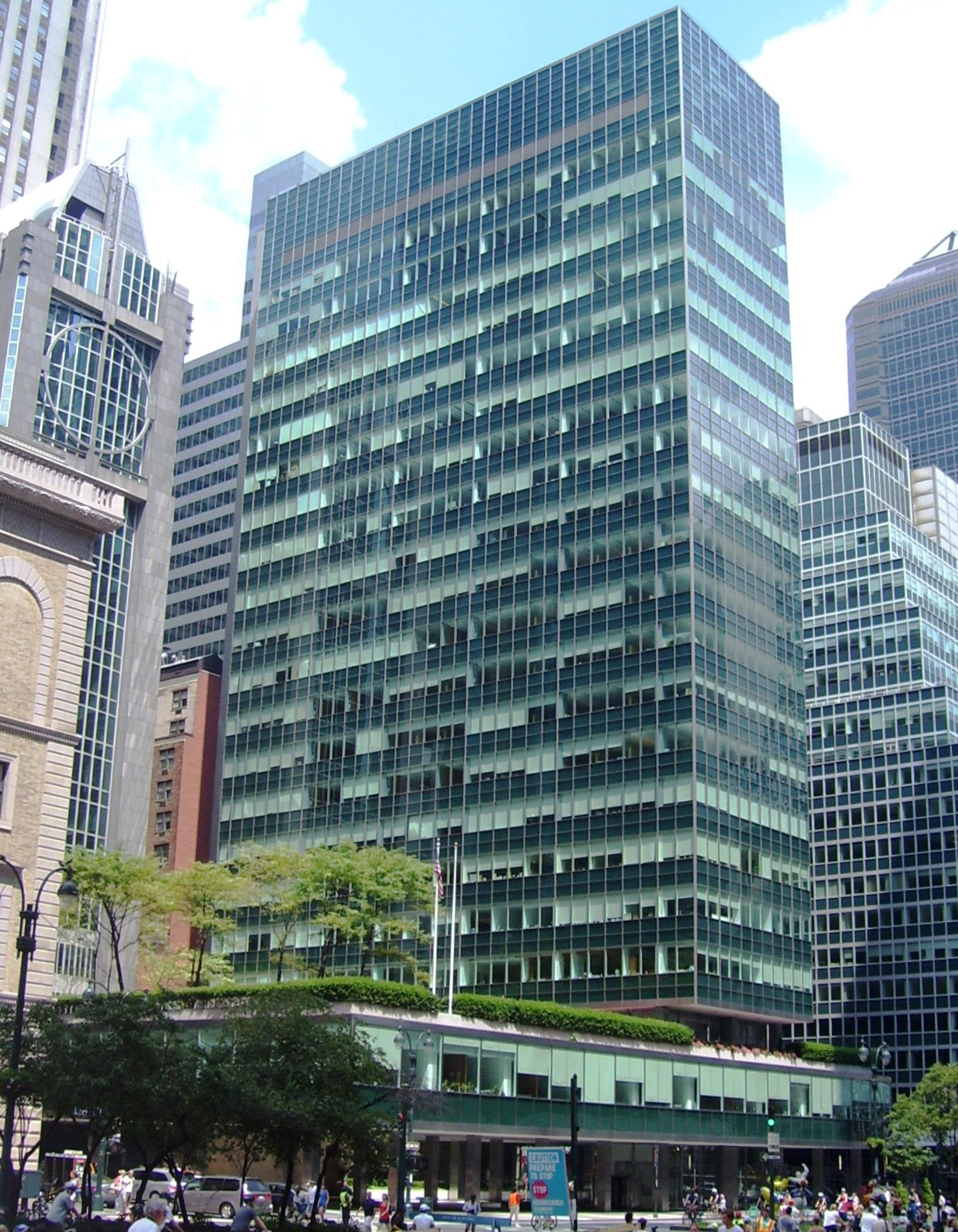
The Lever House in Midtown Manhattan in New York. The building is what brought Luckman back to practicing architecture.

Before leaving his position as president at Lever Brothers, Luckman hired Skidmore, Owings & Merrill to design Lever's headquarters on Park Avenue. The complex, designed by Gordon Bunshaft and Natalie de Blois of Skidmore, Owings & Merrill, was innovative in several other ways, as well, including a rare public plaza at ground level. The Lever House is one of the first sealed glass towers that began the curtain wall trend.

Reminded of his architectural roots, Luckman resigned the presidency of Lever Brothers. He partnered with William Pereira, a fellow architecture student from the University of Illinois, at his firm in Los Angeles. Both would establish their own firm, Pereira & Luckman, the same year. Their firm was one of the largest architecture firms in Los Angeles, designing mostly commercial and civic buildings. Their partnership led to works such as CBS Television City and the master plans for Edwards Air Force Base and Los Angeles International Airport.

In 1950, CBS (which was relocating to Los Angeles from New York) purchased a property site at Fairfax Avenue and Beverly Boulevard to build a new facility for their entertainment productions. Pereira and Luckman were hired to design CBS's television studio and office in Los Angeles. Television City was built in 1952 as an International Style, four-story building consisting of gridded expanses of clear glass set along planar geometries.

In 1953, Pereira and Luckman were commissioned by UC Regents to create a master plan and campus expansion at the University of California, Santa Barbara. The concept included an ‘urban revitalization’ infrastructure program for Isla Vista and Old Town Goleta, a town center (with city hall and other administrative facilities) at Storke and Hollister, and greater connectivity between UCSB and the surrounding community. The buildings designed by Pereira and Luckman were considered modern/international style, with some Spanish Colonial Revival influence.

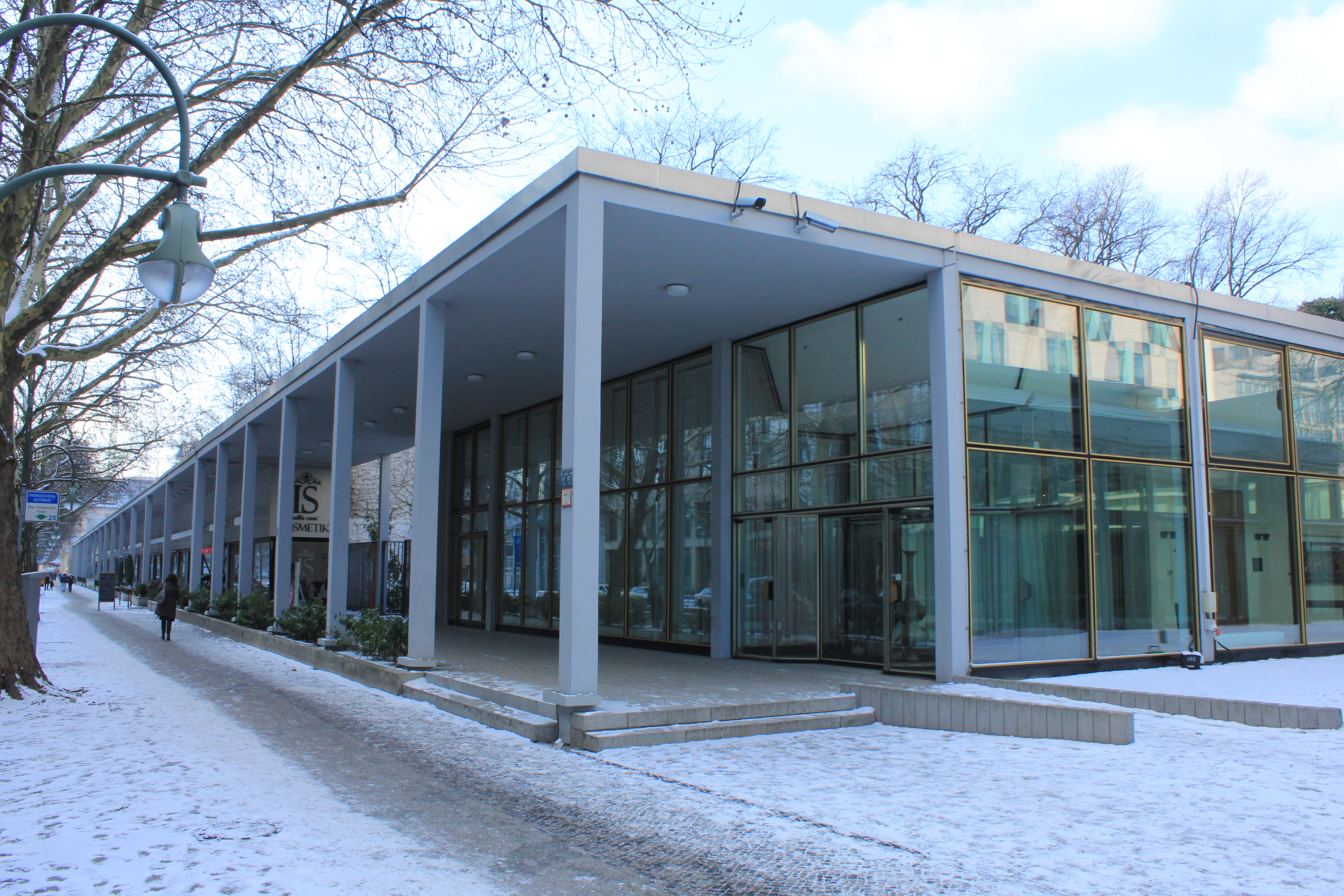
The shops at the Hilton Hotel in Berlin, one of Pereira and Luckmans's works.

In the early 1950s, Walt Disney developed relationships with leaders of the Los Angeles architectural community, notably Pereira and Luckman. He chose Pereira and Luckman due to the fact that both architects were designing Marineland of the Pacific, which was to be the world's largest aquatic park when it opened in 1954. Luckman, who had known Disney for years, recounts hearing Disney describe his concept of Disneyland during lunch in April 1952. He came back with a preliminary design for a seven-acre Disneyland but Disney rejected the concept for being "too small". Luckman said, "I called a halt. Building that Disneyland that big, or bigger, would not only require a larger site than the one on Riverside, it would also require money that Walt Disney did not have." Despite his rejection, Disney hired Pereira and Luckman to design the Disneyland Hotel, which originally consisted of a two-story guestroom complex with shopping, dining and recreational facilities.

In 1958, Pereira and Luckman designed the Union Oil Center (now the Los Angeles Center Studios) for the Union Oil Company of California. The Miesian-style hexagonal tower includes a rectangular inner courtyard, two low tower wings, a large subterranean parking garage, and elevated pedestrian bridges connecting to an auditorium and cafeteria building. The tower has distinctive angled front and rear façades covered with a grid of thin aluminum louvers protecting the offices within from the sun. Upon its completion, the Union Oil Center became the highest building in downtown Los Angeles at the time.

In a disagreement over approaches to architectural and marketing practices, Pereira and Luckman split in 1958.

=== Charles Luckman Associates ===
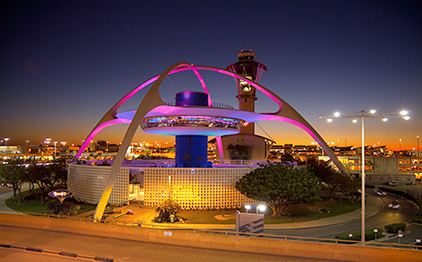
The Theme Building, designed by Luckman with William Pereira and Welton Becket.

After parting ways in 1958, Luckman went on to establish his own firm, Charles Luckman Associates. The firm soon had offices in Boston, Chicago, and Phoenix, in addition to Los Angeles, and by 1968 was one of the country's five largest architectural practices.

In April 1960, a $50 million overall revamp project of the airport, known as the "Los Angeles Jet Age Terminal Construction Project", began at the Los Angeles International Airport. Luckman, along with his former partner, Pereira, and Welton Becket of Los Angeles, were contracted to design the Theme Building. The Theme Building was a concept that Luckman had in mind since 1953. In the original conception, the Theme Building was to be a much larger structure that would have consisted primarily of a glass dome that was meant to be LAX's main ticketing area and terminals. However, the plan was scaled back dramatically before construction even began. The Theme Building would have also hosted a revolving restaurant, giving patrons a 360-degree view of the surrounding area. The mechanism soon proved to be too costly to maintain, and the restaurant became stationary. The Theme Building opened to the public in 1961.

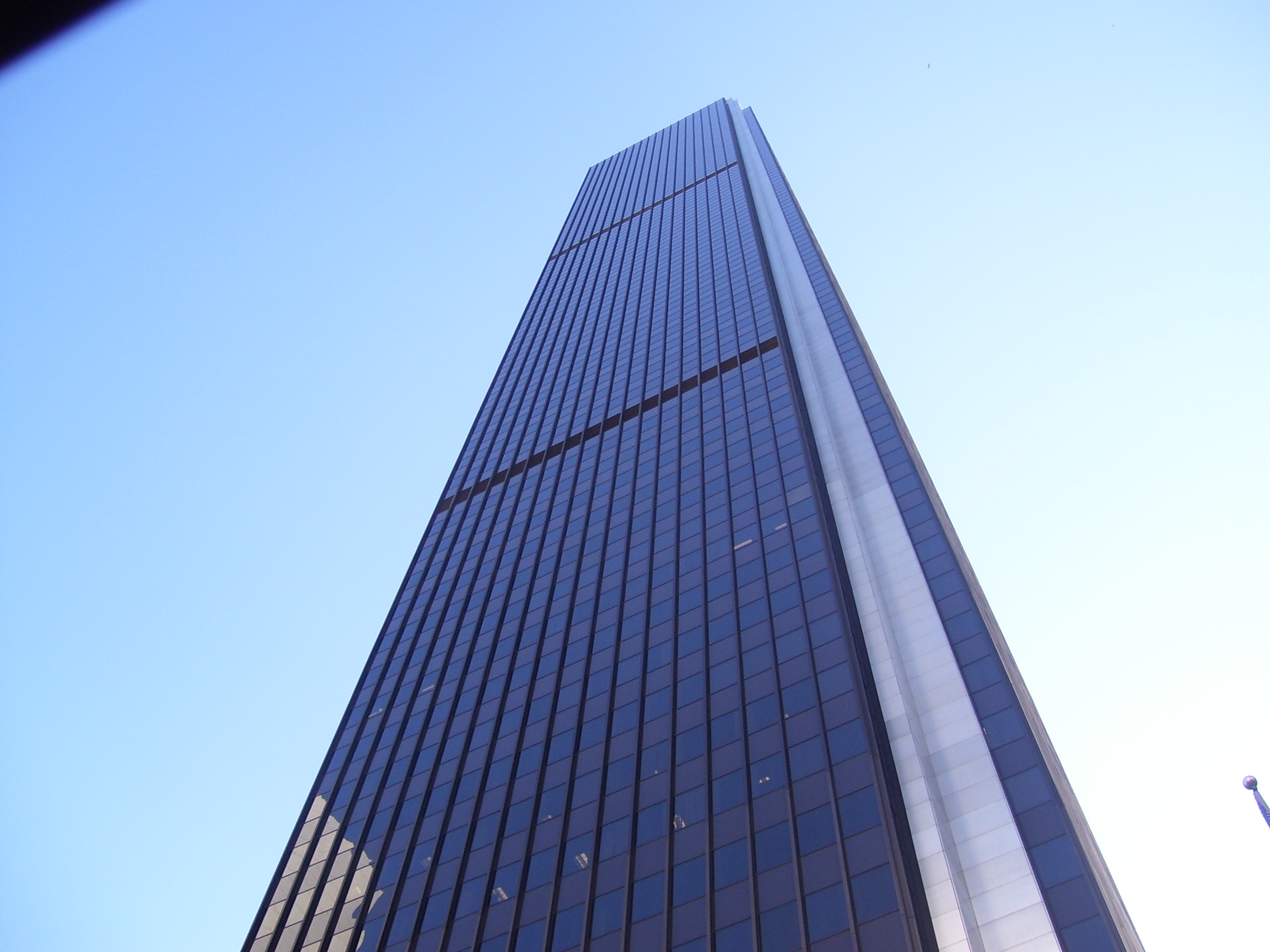
The Aon Center in Los Angeles, which Luckman designed between 1972 and 1973 for United California Bank.

Luckman would later become known for his innovative use of steel. Originally, now gone, there was a second minor Theme-like building: the airport Standard Oil Service Station, which was situated east of the Theme Building. The service station was designed by Luckman in 1962, with Becket and Paul R. Williams. Its design repeated the theme of the circle in its wide cantilevered canopy, matched by its small circular drum for an office. The service station would receive an architectural award of excellence from the American Institute of Steel Construction for the "imaginative use of steel beyond its function as a basic support frame." Luckman designed the United States Pavilion for the 1964 New York World's Fair, for which he received a jury award for the simple and bold structure that utilized dramatic engineering approach through the use of steel.

Luckman's firm went on to design the Prudential Tower in Boston, The Forum in Inglewood, Aon Center in Los Angeles, and the NASA Manned Spacecraft Center in Houston. Furthermore, Luckman is responsible for the design of Madison Square Garden in New York, and the Aloha Stadium in Honolulu, Hawaii. Although Madison Square Garden did not open to the public until 1968, Luckman started designing the center prior to receiving the commission for the Forum.

In 1968, Luckman's second son, James, became president of the firm, while he became chair of the board. That same year, Luckman sold his firm to the Ogden Corporation, a real estate developer based in Southern California, and became president of its subsidiary, Ogden Development. Luckman would retire from the firm in 1977, although he remained an active presence there. The Charles Luckman Associates was eventually reorganized as the Luckman Partnership, with James Luckman holding the position of president until his retirement in 1991.

== Public service ==
In 1946, President Harry Truman appointed Luckman to serve on the President's Committee on Civil Rights, along with 14 other members from business, labor, education, and religious and service organizations. Then in 1947, President Truman appointed Luckman as chairman of the Citizens Food Committee, which assigned him to obligations such as feeding the starving in post-war Europe. In addition, Luckman was the director of Freedom Train, which was a program during the Truman administration that helped rebuild Europe after World War II. In recognition to his work, he was honored with Britain's Order of St. John, France's Legion of Honor, and Italy's Order of the Star of Italian Solidarity.

Luckman was also an active supporter of public education, which served him on the California State Board of Trustees from 1960 through 1982 and was twice chair of the board. Apart from his educational service, Luckman served as president of the Los Angeles Ballet, and as chair of the board of UCLA's Brain Research Institute.

== Personal life ==
Luckman met his wife, Harriet Luckman, during his second years at the University of Illinois. He met Harriet when a friend of his suggested going on a blind date with her. Charles and Harriet married in 1931 and had three sons: Charles Jr., James, and Stephen Luckman. In 1994, Luckman dedicated the Charles and Harriet Luckman Fine Arts Complex at California State University, Los Angeles through a donation of $2.1 million.

On January 26, 1999, Luckman died at his Los Angeles home at the age of 89.

== Selected works ==
- 1951, Farmers & Stockmen's Bank, Phoenix, Arizona
- 1951, Robinson's department store, Beverly Hills, California (demolished)
- 1953, CBS Television City, Los Angeles, California
- 1954, National Bureau of Standards building, Boulder, Colorado
- 1954, Santa Rosa Hall – Dormitory, University of California, Santa Barbara, California
- 1954, Marineland of the Pacific, Rancho Palos Verdes, California
- 1956, Fallbrook Hospital, Fallbrook, California
- 1956, Prudential Tower, Boston, Massachusetts
- 1958, Bullock's Fashion Square, Santa Ana, California (partially demolished, now Westfield MainPlace)
- 1958, Disneyland Hotel, California (two-story complex demolished)
- 1958, Los Angeles International Airport
- 1958, Robinson's department store, Palm Springs, California
- 1961, Monsignor Farrell High School, Staten Island, New York
- 1961, Theme Building, Los Angeles International Airport, Los Angeles, California
- 1962–1963, Lyndon B. Johnson Space Center (formerly the Manned Spacecraft Center), Houston, Texas
- 1964, 9200 Sunset (formerly the Luckman Plaza), West Hollywood, California
- 1964–1965, Kennedy Space Center (formerly the Launch Operations Center and Launch Operations Directorate), Merritt Island, Florida
- 1964, Federal Pavilion (demolished in 1977), New York City
- 1967, The Forum, Inglewood, California
- 1968, Madison Square Garden, New York City
- 1969–1972, Phoenix Symphony Hall, Phoenix, Arizona
- 1972–1973, Aon Center (also known as 707 Wilshire, formerly the First Interstate Tower and United California Bank Building), Los Angeles, California
- 1973, Broadway Plaza incl. The Broadway dept. store and Hyatt Regency Hotel, now The Bloc Los Angeles, 700 S Flower St., Downtown Los Angeles
- 1975, Aloha Stadium, Halawa, Hawaii
- 1981–1982, Conoco-Phillips Building, Anchorage, Alaska (with Harold Wirum & Associates)
