= Theme Building =

Historic structure at Los Angeles International Airport, California, U.S.

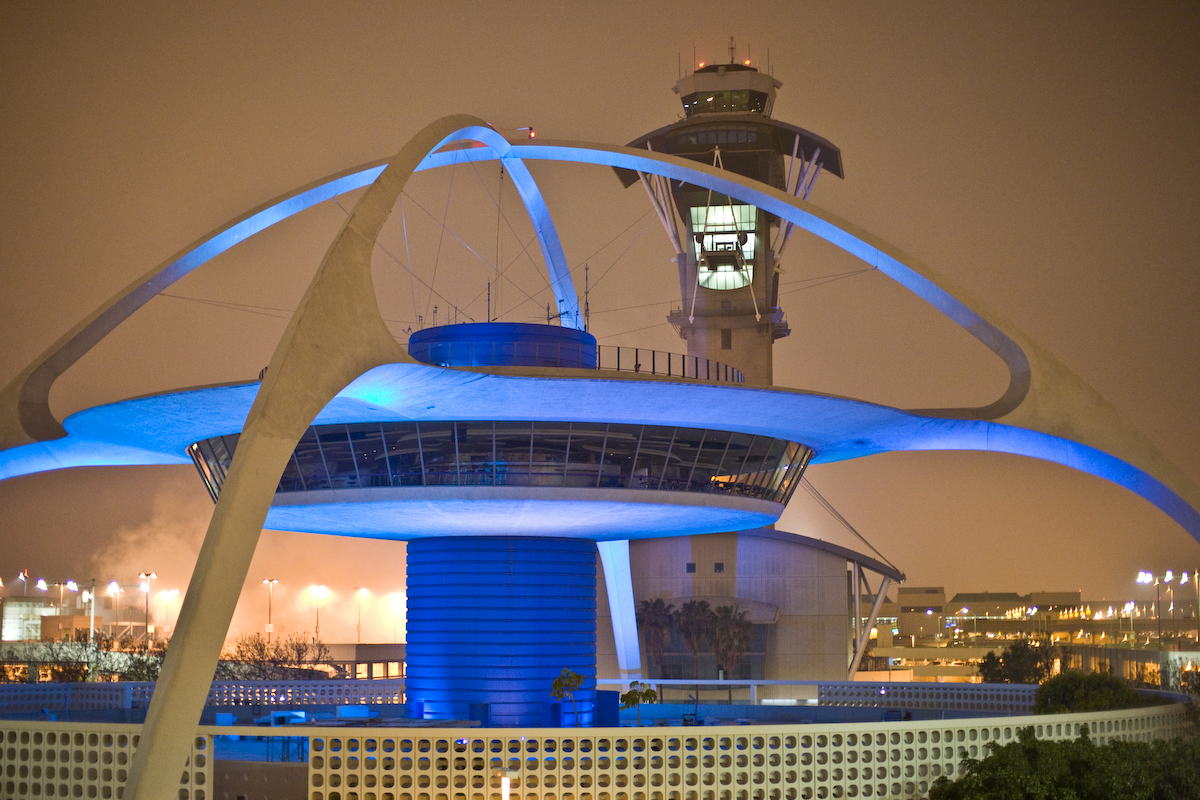
- The illuminated exterior of the Theme Building at night, 2007

- Location within the Los Angeles metropolitan area
- 33°56′38.76″N 118°24′8.64″W
- Location: 201 World Way; Westchester, Los Angeles, California; United States

History
- Built: 1957–1961

Site notes
- Architect(s): Pereira & Luckman, Paul Williams and Welton Becket
- Architectural styles: Mid-century modern, Googie
- Governing body: Los Angeles World Airports

Los Angeles Historic-Cultural Monument
- Designated: December 18, 1993
- Reference no.: 570

The Theme Building is a structure at Los Angeles International Airport (LAX), considered an architectural example of the Space Age design style. Influenced by "Populuxe" architecture, it is an example of the mid-century modern design movement, later to become known as "Googie". In 1993, the city designated the exterior and interior of the Theme Building as a historic-cultural monument.

== Architecture ==
The distinctive white building resembles a flying saucer that has landed on its four legs. The initial design was created by James Langenheim, of Pereira & Luckman, subsequently taken to fruition by a team of architects and engineers, headed by William Pereira and Charles Luckman, that also included Paul Williams and Welton Becket. The civil engineer was Richard Bradshaw.

The appearance of the building's signature crossed arches as homogeneous structures is a design illusion, created by topping four steel-reinforced concrete legs extending approximately 15 feet above the ground with hollow stucco-covered steel trusses. To counteract earthquake movements, the Theme Building was retrofitted in 2010 with a tuned mass damper without changing its outward appearance.

Constructed near the beginning of the Space Age, the building is an example of how aeronautics and pop culture, design and architecture came together in Los Angeles.

== History ==
The original design for the airport created by Pereira & Luckman in 1959 had all the terminal buildings and parking structures connected to a huge glass dome, which would serve as a central hub for traffic circulation. The plan was eventually scaled down considerably, and the terminals were constructed elsewhere on the property. The Theme Building was subsequently built to mark the spot intended for the dome structure, as a reminder of the original plan.

The building construction contract was awarded to Robert E. McKee General Contractor, Inc. of El Paso, Texas.

The structure was dedicated on June 25, 1961, by Vice President Lyndon B. Johnson. The Los Angeles City Council designated the building, which lies within the Westchester neighborhood of the city of Los Angeles, a historic-cultural monument (no. 570) in 1993.

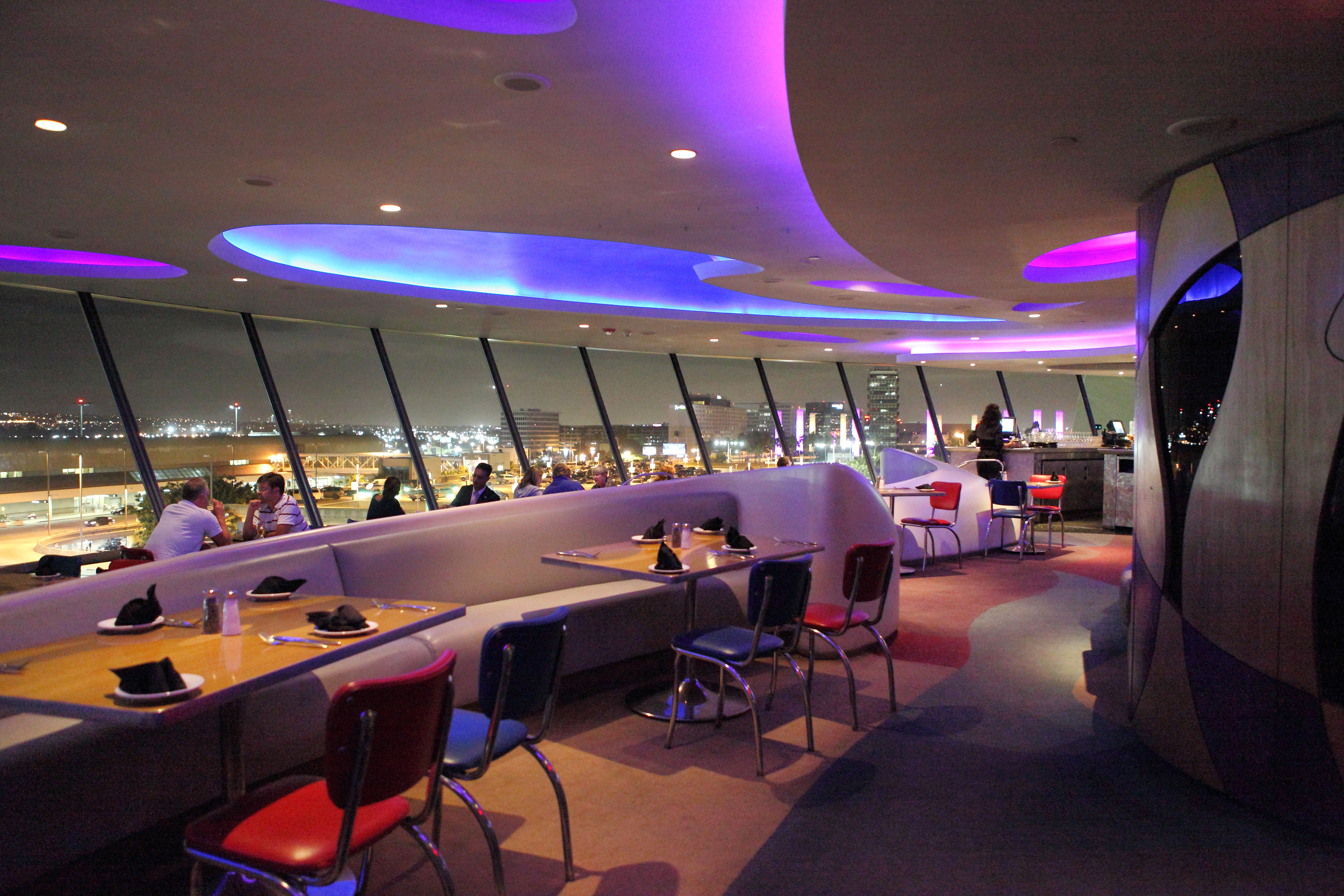
Interior of Encounter Restaurant (2013)

A $4 million renovation, with retro-futuristic interior and electric lighting designed by Walt Disney Imagineering, was completed before the Encounter Restaurant opened there in 1997. Visitors are able to take an elevator up to the Observation Level to get a 360-degree view of arriving and departing planes. An airport spokeswoman said that because of its appearance and views, some people thought it revolved after visiting it, even though it did not.

After the September 11, 2001 attacks, the Observation Level was closed for security reasons. On September 9, 2003, a permanent memorial honoring those who perished in the attacks of September 11 was opened on the grounds of the Theme Building.

In March 2007, a 1/2 tonne (500 kg) piece of the stucco skin on the upper arches crashed onto the roof of the restaurant, forcing it to temporarily close for repairs. The restaurant reopened on November 12, 2007.

In 2010, following a $12.3 million restoration of the building, the observation level re-opened to the public on weekends. Delaware North Companies Travel Hospitality Services operated the restaurant.

The Encounter Restaurant closed for business in December 2013 with no future plans to reopen. The reason cited was that the restaurant was in a non-secure area of the airport, so travelers were reluctant to spend time there when a possibly lengthy security checkpoint lay ahead, or leave after being screened and have to go through security again upon returning. The observation level of the building was then open on weekends until 2016 when its schedule was reduced to one weekend per month, before closing permanently in September 2018.

In 2018, the Bob Hope USO at LAX relocated to the ground floor of the Theme Building, opening a 7,100 square foot facility described by its president as "the most technologically advanced USO in existence."

== See also ==
- Niterói Contemporary Art Museum
