= Abie the Agent =

American newspaper comic strip

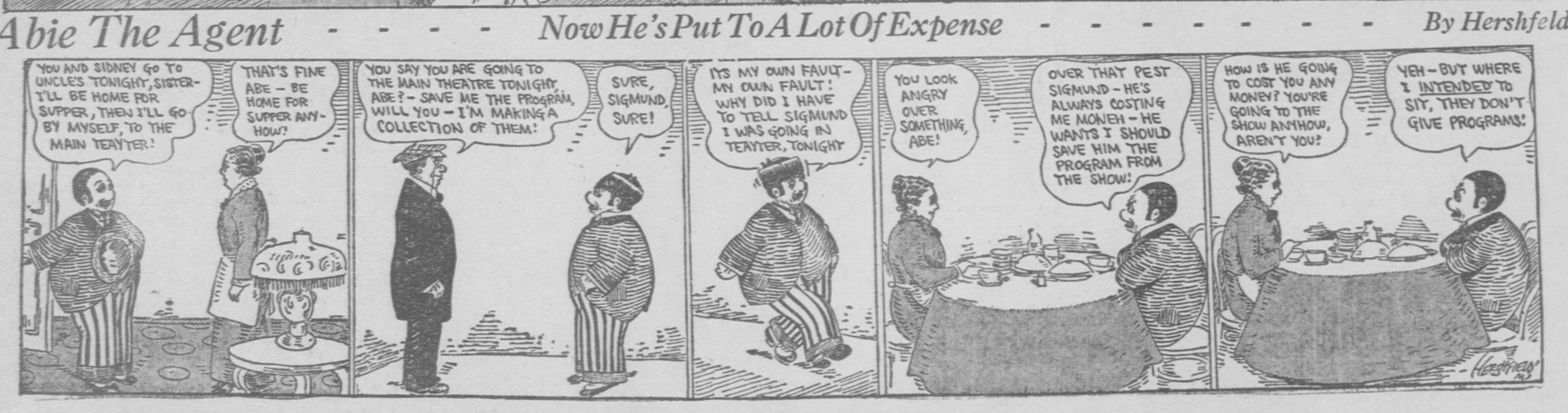
- Harry Hershfield's Abie the Agent
- Author: Harry Hershfield
- Current status/schedule: Concluded daily & Sunday strip
- Launch date: February 2, 1914
- End date: 1940
- Syndicate(s): King Features Syndicate
- Genre(s): Humor, immigrant Jewish life, Yiddishism

Abie the Agent is an American comic strip about a Jewish car salesman by Harry Hershfield. It debuted in 1914.

== Publication history ==
When Hershfield had success with a Yiddish character in his comic strip Desperate Desmond, he was encouraged by his editor to create a new strip concerning Yiddishism and Jewish immigrants in the United States. The strip debuted in the New York Journal on February 2, 1914.

Hershfield was additionally motivated by his opposition to antisemitic caricatures featured in Puck and other humor magazines, seeking to provide "a clean-cut, well-dressed specimen of Jewish humor" in response to depictions that he found "not at all complementary to the Jewish people and not at all justified."

The strip became popular and other cartoons were made. The titles were "Iska Worreh" (Aug 5) and "Abie Kabibble Outwitting His Rival" (Sept 23).

After the strip dated January 24, 1932, the comic strip went on hiatus, due to a contract dispute between Hershfield and the syndicate, International Feature Service. The strip resumed in 1935 with the King Features Syndicate and ran until 1940.

The Sunday page included a topper. This was called Phooey Fables in January 1926, Dictated But Not Read from February until the end of 1926, and Homeless Hector from 1927 until the hiatus in 1932.

== Characters and story ==
Abraham Kabibble, known as Abie the Agent, was the first Jewish protagonist of an American comic strip. Abie's humorous caricature was a rebuttal of some of the Jewish stereotypes in caricatures, and represented a moderately successful middle-class immigrant. Abie and his friends had many typical Jewish characteristics, such as their names or their use of Yiddish words and accents, they also lacked many of the negative or malicious elements, such as exaggerated physical traits, found in the depictions of Jews from this time. Abie was in many ways indistinguishable from other Americans. In 1917, the character enlisted in the United States Army to help the U.S. forces in World War I.

The character lost many of his more typical Jewish characteristics over the decades, showing his successful integration, slowly diminishing the particular features of the comic strip in doing so. To this end, Abie the Agent would often demean other marginalized communities, targeting Black Americans in particular in order to highlight the perceived whiteness of Abie and, by extension, the American Jewish community as a whole.

== In popular culture ==
An indication of the strip's popularity was the reference to 'Abe Kabibble' in the 1930 Marx Brothers film Animal Crackers.

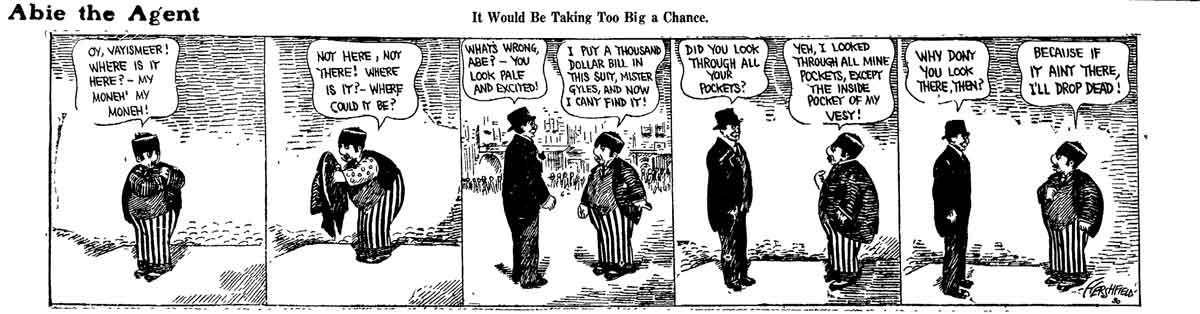
Harry Hershfield's Abie the Agent (1917)

Two animated shorts were made in 1917 by International Film Service.

Kabibble made a recent appearance in a September 20 2026 strip of Popeye.

== See also ==
- Edge City
