= William Pereira =

American architect (1909–1985)

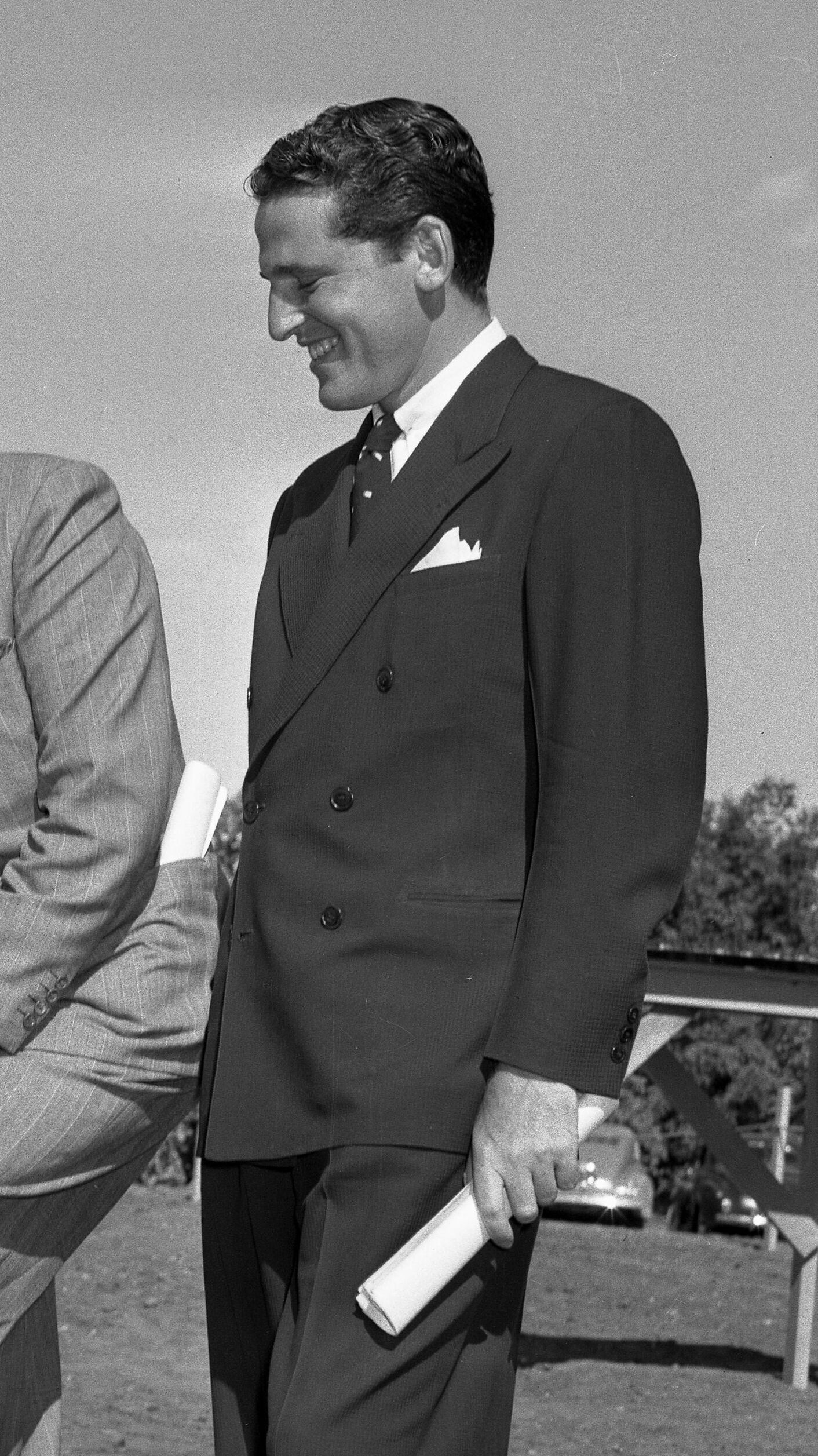
- Pereira in 1941
- Born: William Leonard Pereira; April 25, 1909; Chicago, Illinois, U.S.
- Died: November 13, 1985 (aged 76); Los Angeles, California, U.S.
- Occupation: Architect
- Practice: William L. Pereira & Associates
- Buildings: Transamerica Pyramid; Geisel Library; Chet Holifield Federal Building; Disneyland Hotel (California); Los Angeles County Museum of Art
- Design: Concrete-shelled buildings of streamlined and expressive shapes

William Leonard Pereira (April 25, 1909 – November 13, 1985) was an American architect from Chicago, Illinois, who was noted for his futuristic designs of landmark buildings such as the Transamerica Pyramid in San Francisco. He worked out of Los Angeles and was known for his love of science fiction and expensive cars, but mostly for his style of architecture, which helped define the look of the mid-20th century United States.

== Early life ==
Pereira was born in Chicago, Illinois, the son of Sarah (Friedberg) and Saul Pereira. His paternal grandfather was of Portuguese Sephardi Jewish ancestry, and his other grandparents were Ashkenazi Jews. Pereira graduated from the School of Architecture, University of Illinois and began his career in his home city. He had some of his earliest architectural experience helping to draft the master plan for the 1933 "A Century of Progress" Chicago World's Fair. With his brother, Hal Pereira, he designed the Esquire Theater at 58 East Oak Street, considered one of Chicago's best examples of Art Deco style.

== Career ==
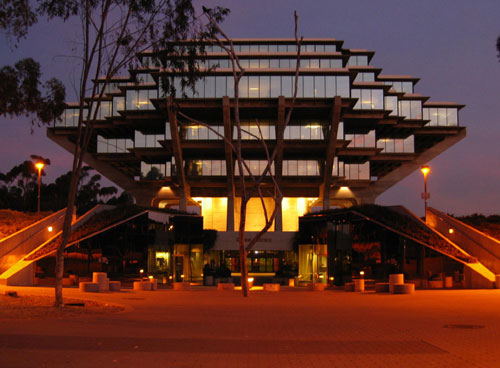
Geisel Library (1970) at the University of California, San Diego

Pereira moved to Los Angeles in 1933, and Hal also relocated there in that decade. After working as a solo architect, Pereira was hired by the Motion Picture Relief Fund and designed the first buildings for the Motion Picture Country House in Woodland Hills, California, which was dedicated September 27, 1942.

Pereira also had a brief stint as a Hollywood art director. He shared an Academy Award for Best Special Effects for the action/adventure film Reap the Wild Wind (1942). He was the art director for This Gun for Hire, Alan Ladd's first film. He was production designer of the drama Jane Eyre (1943), and of the war drama Since You Went Away (1944). Pereira was also the producer of the noir crime/drama Johnny Angel (1945), and of the Joan Fontaine drama From This Day Forward (1946).

In 1949, Pereira became a professor of architecture at the University of Southern California. He then formed a partnership with fellow architect and classmate, Charles Luckman, in the early 1950s. The firm, Pereira & Luckman, grew into one of the nation's busiest. The duo designed some of Los Angeles's most well-known buildings, including the famed "Theme Building" at Los Angeles International Airport (in collaboration with Paul Williams and Welton Becket).

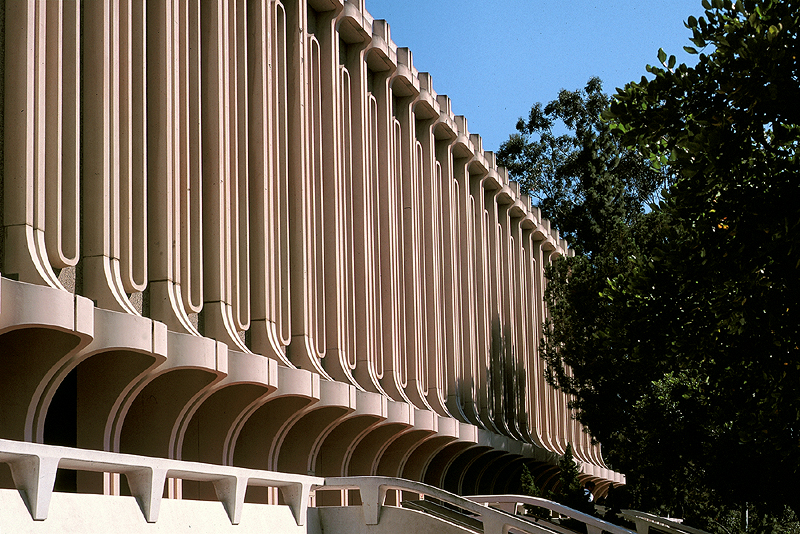
Langson Library at the University of California, Irvine, illustrating Pereira's paneled façade system

He parted with Luckman in 1959. Afterward, he formed the third and final company of his career, "William L. Pereira & Associates." In the 1960s and 1970s, he and his team completed over 250 projects, including drawing up the master plans for the Los Angeles International Airport expansion and developing the master plan for the 93,000 acres (38,000 ha) city of Irvine, California, which put his photograph on the cover of the Time magazine issue of September 6, 1963. He later worked with Ian McHarg on the plan for the new town of The Woodlands, Texas. Pereira also designed the campus plans of the University of Southern California, the University of California, Irvine, and Pepperdine University.

His firm's designs varied greatly, but had many common design hallmarks, such as strong geometric forms, twinned vertical columns, elevated causeways, and perhaps most distinctly, a liberal use of bespoke lampposts and lighting fixtures, designed to complement their associated structures. Many of his buildings were also complemented by expansive water features. A pioneer in the design of heat-efficient buildings, he often employed concrete façade systems that shaded the windows, which were typically of bronze reflective glass, from direct sunlight.

According to Pereira's daughter, Monica, one of his favorite buildings of his own was the complex he designed for the Municipal Water District in Los Angeles in 1963.

In 1967, Pereira founded Aero Commuter, a Los Angeles area commuter airline that eventually became Golden West Airlines. Pereira's son was one of the founders of Air California.

== Personal life and death ==
He had two wives, former model and actress Margaret McConnell (1910–2011, married June 24, 1934) and Bronya Galef; the latter marriage ending with his death. He has a son, William Pereira Jr., and a daughter, Monica Pereira, a Spanish teacher.

In contrast to his famous modernist design sensibilities, Bill Pereira once practiced out of a small collection of rustic offices on the site of what was then known as the ‘Buffalo Ranch,’ part of the much larger Irvine Ranch, two miles from where the UCI campus stands today, in Corona Del Mar/Newport Beach. He chose to live in the Emerald Bay community in north Laguna Beach, and in later life he considered Laguna as his home town.

William Pereira died of cancer at age 76 at Cedars-Sinai Medical Center in Los Angeles. At his request, no funeral services were planned.

== Legacy ==
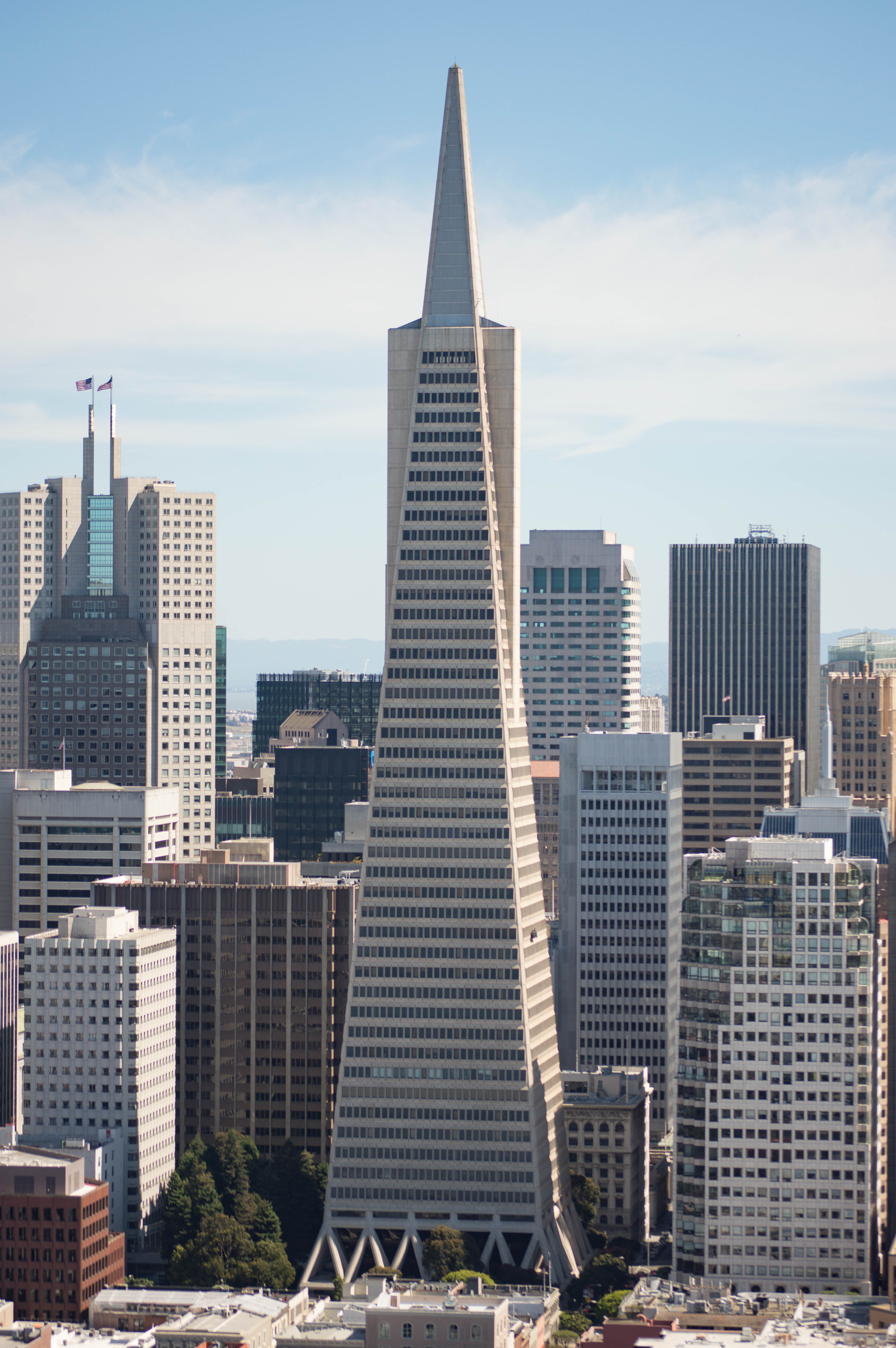
Transamerica Pyramid, San Francisco, 1972

By the time of his death, Pereira had over 400 projects to his name. Among the structures he designed throughout Southern California were CBS Television City, Fox Plaza, the Los Angeles County Museum of Art, the Howard Johnson Hotel and Water Playground in Anaheim, and the Disneyland Hotel in Anaheim. He is also responsible for creating the monumental Spanish-inspired facades that defined Robinson's department stores for nearly 20 years, and he was the architect of Pepperdine University at Malibu, named by the Princeton Review as the most beautiful college campus in America.

His most praised and criticized work was probably the Transamerica building, which was completed in 1972. When the building was first unveiled in 1969 it was met with harsh criticism, but has been accepted as having more character than the buildings around it and as being an oddly creative city symbol.

Numerous respected architects came out of both Pereira's firm and the classes he taught at USC, including Gin Wong and Frank Gehry. Pereira's firm was taken over upon his death by his two primary cohorts, Scott Johnson and Bill Fain.

== See also ==
- List of William Pereira buildings
