= Martin Begley =

American performer (1903–1985)

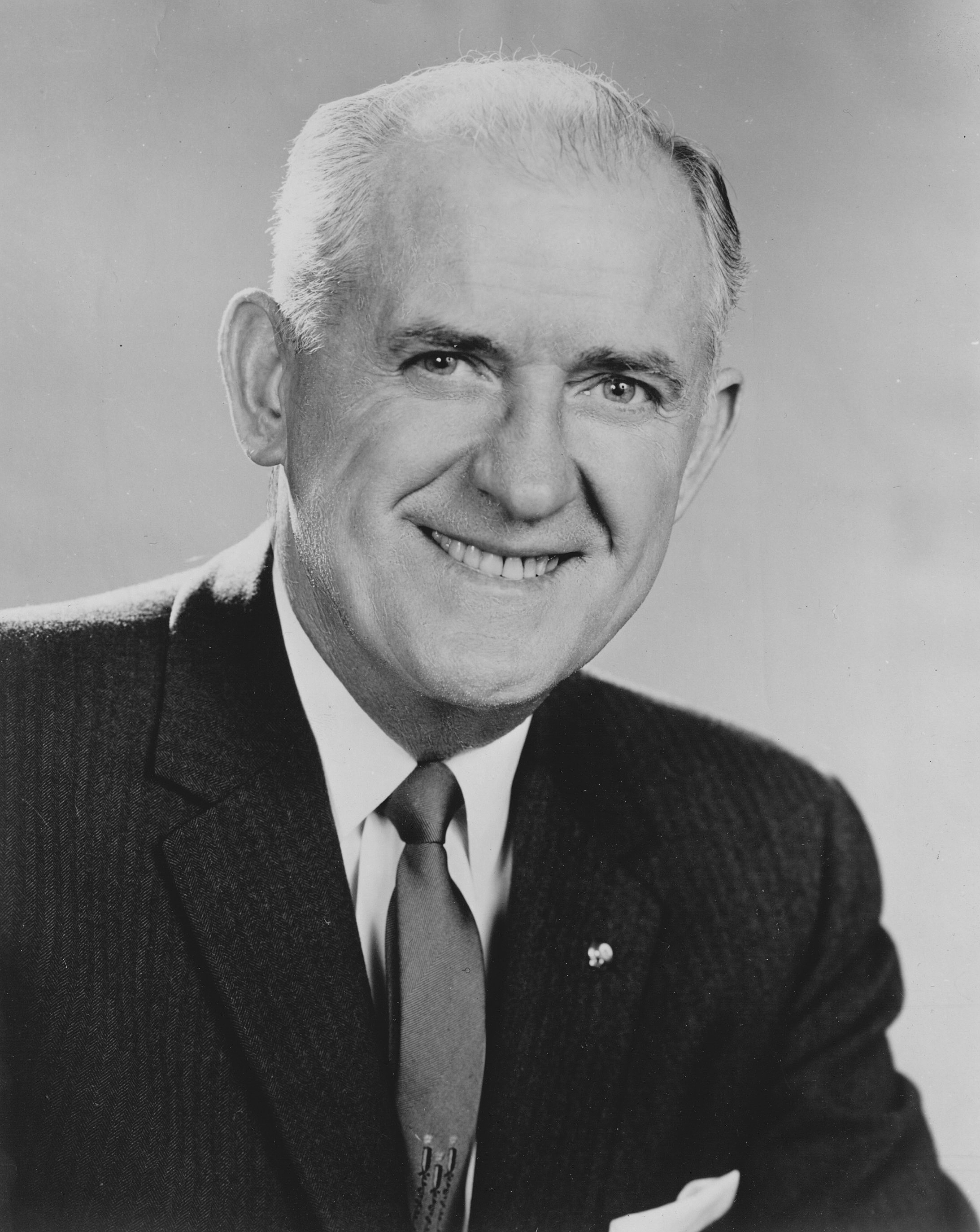
- Martin Begley 1965

Shepherd of The Lambs
- In office 1963–1966
- Preceded by: Frank M. Thomas
- Succeeded by: Harry Hershfield

Personal details
- Born: Martin Joseph Begley; 25 August 1903 Hartford, Connecticut
- Died: 6 March 1985 (aged 81) Plantation, Florida, US
- Resting place: Cemetery of the Holy Rood
- Spouse: Dorinda Marie Woodward Begley
- Relatives: Ed Begley Sr
- Occupation: Actor * Talent Scout

Martin J. Begley (25 August 1903 – 6 March 1985) was an actor, dancer, and talent scout. He was the Shepherd of The Lambs social club from 1963 to 1966.

== Background ==
Born in Hartford, Connecticut, he was the son of Hannah (née Clifford) and Michael Joseph Begley, Irish immigrants. His older brother was Edward James Begley Sr., an Academy Award-winning actor of theatre, radio, film, and television.

== Career ==
Martin Begley began his career in vaudeville in 1923 as a traveling actor. In 1932 he ran a dance studio in Boston during the Depression. From 1934 to 1939 he worked for the Federal Theater Project in Massachusetts, a musical revue program that was a branch of the Works Progress Administration. During World War II he worked in daytime radio soap operas for NBC, ABC, and the Dumont Network.

In 1947 Begley teamed with his older brother as his manager in Hollywood. Begley then returned to New York to work for NBC-TV as a talent scout.

Begley worked in the casting department of NBC for ten years, rising to a senior executive level. After NBC, he held a role with the advertising agency Lennen & Newell as director of talent operations.

== The Lambs ==
Begley joined the social club The Lambs in 1945. In October 1963 Begley was elected Shepherd (president), succeeding Frank Thomas.

He served from 1 January 1964 to 31 December 1966. At the time, the clubhouse was located at 130 W. 44th Street. When Begley's role as Shepherd of the Lambs ended in 1966, he and his wife retired to Florida in 1967. They had two children, Martin Jr. and Dorinda. His wife died in 1972.

Begley died 6 March 1985 in Plantation, Florida. Martin J. Begley is interred in Cemetery of the Holy Rood, Westbury, Long Island.
