= 9200 Sunset =

- Interactive map of the 9200 Sunset area
- Former names: Luckman Plaza

General information
- Status: Completed
- Type: Commercial offices
- Architectural style: International Style
- Location: West Hollywood, California, 9200 Sunset Boulevard
- Coordinates: 34.0898°N 118.3926°W
- Completed: 1964 (9220 Sunset); 1971 (9200 Sunset)
- Renovated: 2009
- Cost: US$10.8 million
- Owner: Mani Brothers Real Estate Group

Height
- Height: 55.78 m (183.0 ft)

Technical details
- Floor count: 14
- Floor area: 300,000 ft^{2} (28,000 m^{2})

Design and construction
- Architect: Charles Luckman

Renovating team
- Architect: Stephen Kanner
- Renovating firm: Diamond National Glass
- Other designers: Debra Brown-Kondratczyk

Website
- Official site

9200 Sunset (formerly Luckman Plaza) is a commercial office building at 9200 and 9220 Sunset Boulevard at the west end of the Sunset Strip in West Hollywood, California.

Designed by Charles Luckman, the project consists of two office buildings totaling 300,000 ft^{2} (28,000 m^{2}) of office and restaurant space, which are connected by a central lobby.

== History ==
The first building, originally constructed in 1964, is shaped like a triangle and is three stories tall. It once served as headquarters for Charles Luckman and Associates.

The second building, which consists of 14 stories and fronts Sunset Boulevard, was completed as an office tower in 1971. Luckman later added a penthouse floor on top of the building, which served as his personal residence.

The Luckman family owned 9200 Sunset from its initial construction until 2006, when it sold the project to the Mani Brothers Real Estate Group for an estimated $160 million.

== Renovation ==
In 2009, architect Stephen Kanner completed a multimillion-dollar overhaul of the project, reorganizing and upgrading the common area space, and enclosing the open-air plaza at street level. The re-cladding, re-skinning of the exterior and new glass and glazing was performed by Diamond National Glass.

== Tenants ==
9200 Sunset is regarded as one of the "top entertainment office properties" in Los Angeles, and is home to many companies from the entertainment industry, including Ford Models, Abrams Artists, Atlas Entertainment and Media Talent Group, among others. Mosaic Los Angeles, Sotheby's auction house and Comerica are also listed as tenants. During the early 1960s, Lucille Ball Productions was located in the building.

Darren Star Productions has its offices on the 4th floor of the building.

Innovative Dining Group's BOA Steakhouse opened its flagship restaurant in the Spring of 2009 at the street level, which feature 13,000 ft^{2} (1,200 m^{2}) of indoor and outdoor patio dining space in the former open-air plaza.

In the spring of 2010, the Soho House opened the West Hollywood branch of their private, members-only club on the top two floors in the Penthouse space which was the Luckman residence.
