= Television City =

Television studio complex in Los Angeles, California

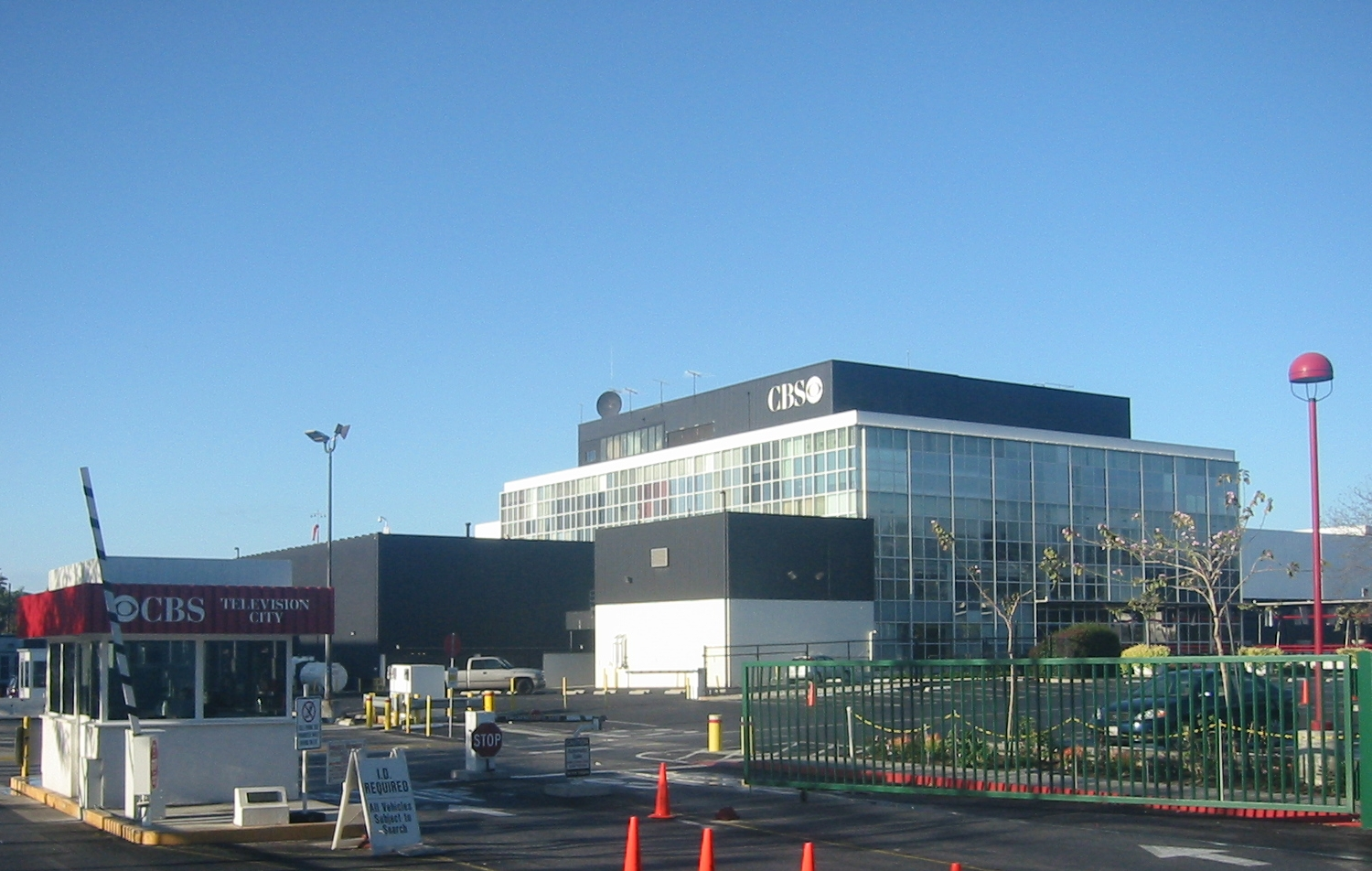
- Television City in Los Angeles

- Location within Western Los Angeles
- Alternative names: CBS Television City; Television City Studios

General information
- Type: Television studios
- Location: Fairfax District, Los Angeles, 7800 Beverly Boulevard; Los Angeles, California; 90036
- Coordinates: 34.074444°N 118.36°W
- Inaugurated: November 16, 1952; 74 years ago
- Owner: Hackman Capital Partners

Design and construction
- Architect: Pereira & Luckman

Website
- tvcstudios.com

Television City, alternatively CBS Television City, is a television studio complex located in the Fairfax District of Los Angeles, California, United States. The facilities are located at 7800 Beverly Boulevard, at the corner of Fairfax Avenue. Designed by architect William Pereira and Charles Luckman, Television City opened in 1952 as a dedicated electronic (video) production facility, the second CBS network show factory in Southern California, paralleling 35mm film production at CBS Studio Center in the Studio City section of the San Fernando Valley. Since 1961, Television City has also served as a national backup master control facility for CBS's television network operations. In 2018, CBS sold Television City to the real estate investment company Hackman Capital Partners while continuing to exclusively lease its space.

Since its opening, numerous TV shows, specials and events have been broadcast live or recorded at Television City over the years, including many shows not aired on CBS. It has also been the production site of several films such as the 1996 feature That Thing You Do!, starring Tom Hanks and Liv Tyler. During the opening credits of many of the shows recorded here, a voice-over announced the phrase "from Television City in Hollywood". The complex currently houses a total of eight separate studios. The facility infrequently conducts backstage tours led by a CBS page.

== History ==
CBS planned to move most of its entertainment operations to the Los Angeles area in 1950. As they needed additional space beyond its Columbia Square complex on Sunset Boulevard, CBS purchased the property at Fairfax Avenue and Beverly Boulevard that year. Hiring architect William Pereira, the company reportedly spent $7 million on the studio. The studio complex was built on the site that was previously occupied by the Gilmore Stadium (multi-purpose, primarily football) and the Gilmore Field (baseball).

Initially, the four original studios were equipped with RCA TK-10 monochrome cameras. Studio 43 was equipped with RCA TK-40/41 color cameras in 1954, with cables allowing any of the original four studios to use those cameras. In 1956, Studio 41 was equipped with RCA TK-41s. However, CBS color broadcasts decreased in frequency until the following decade, when the 1964 production of Rodgers and Hammerstein's Cinderella was recorded—the last known use of the RCA color cameras. CBS programs were, in general, in black-and-white until Norelco PC-60 color cameras were installed starting in late 1964.

In September 2017, CBS investigated selling the property due to a development boom in the Fairfax District. As a result of this possibility, the city of Los Angeles is taking steps (as of May 2018) to officially declare the facility a historic and cultural monument. CBS Corp. sold Television City to Los Angeles real estate investment company Hackman Capital Partners for $750 million in a deal finalized on December 10, 2018. The deal gives the buyer the right to use the Television City name. Certain CBS programs produced at Television City, including The Young and the Restless and The Bold and the Beautiful, will continue to be based at Television City, as well as the headquarters of the CBS international unit.

== Architecture ==
The stark modern architecture at Television City consists of black and white planes meeting at razor-sharp corners, with accents of dazzling red, the work of Pereira & Luckman of Los Angeles. The studio facility was built to handle the larger production needs for the network, most of which took place at the rather cramped CBS Columbia Square. The building's black and white color scheme was also used to identify areas where it was designed to be expanded. Black walls and glass walls indicated "temporary" structure that could be removed during expansion, while white areas were "permanent".

The building initially held four soundstages (Studios 31, 33, 41, and 43), but a renovation in the late 1980s added two new soundstages to the east of the original building (Studios 36 and 46), plus additional office/storage space and technical facilities. Later, another renovation further added two more studios (Studios 56 and 58) in what had been rehearsal halls in the original building. The original plans for Television City called for 24 soundstages, before CBS executives decided to settle with just the initial four.

In 1998, Studio 33 was dedicated as the "Bob Barker Studio" in honor of the 5,000th episode of CBS's game show The Price Is Right, which had filmed its present run in the studio from 1972 to 2023.

== Hackman Capital Partners ==
In 2021, new owner Hackman announced plans for a major, $1.25 billion redevelopment of the facility, which will expand Television City to at least 15 soundstages, and add additional office space. Parts of the expansion will be built atop existing parking lots, which will be converted to parking garages. The four original studios and its architectural qualities will be preserved. Due to the redevelopment, a number of shows began to relocate to other locations as their leases expired; in 2023, The Price is Right would relocate to a studio in Glendale after having filmed at Television City for 51 consecutive seasons, while The Bold and the Beautiful announced a move to the nearby Sunset Las Palmas Studios in 2025, after 38 years at Television City.

The City Council approved the plans in early 2025. News reports indicate Hackman Capital was in default on its properties, Radford Studio Center. Reports indicate Television City was not at risk of foreclosure and that constructions plans remain. Although various potential buyers, including Rick Caruso, owner of the Grove Market next door have been circulated by local media, Caruso is currently suing in court to stop the re-development.

== Shows produced at Television City ==
Below is a partial list of programs that have been broadcast live or recorded at Television City.

- The $10,000/25,000/100,000 Pyramid
- Alice (pilot episode only)
- All in the Family
- Amateur's Guide to Love
- American Idol (2002–2016, 2018–2019, 2021–2022)
- America's Got Talent (2009–2011)
- Archie Bunker's Place
- Are You Smarter than a 5th Grader? (2008–2009, 2015)
- Art Linkletter's House Party
- Beat Shazam
- Beat the Clock
- Blackout
- The Bold and the Beautiful (1987–2025)
- Body Language
- Bullseye
- The Burns and Allen Show
- Can You Top This?
- Capitol
- Card Sharks (1986–1989, 2019)
- The Carol Burnett Show
- Celebrity Table Tennis
- Cher
- Cherries Wild
- Child's Play
- Climax!
- Contraption
- Crosswits
- Dancing with the Stars
- The Danny Kaye Show
- Deal or No Deal (2005)
- Dennis Miller Live
- Dinah!
- Dirty Rotten Cheater
- Don Adams' Screen Test
- Don't Forget the Lyrics! (2007–2009)
- Double Dare (1976–77)
- The Edsel Show
- Family Feud (1988–95, 1999–2000)
  - Celebrity Family Feud (2015, 2017–2022)
- Follow the Leader (TV series)
- The Game Game
- Game Show in My Head
- Game Show Moments Gone Bananas
- Gambit
- Gameshow Marathon (2006)
- Give-n-Take
- The Glen Campbell Goodtime Hour (1969–1972)
- The Gong Show
- Good Times
- High Rollers (1987–1988)
- The Hollywood Game
- Hollywood Squares (1998–2004, 2025)
- Hollywood's Talking
- I've Got a Secret
- Insight
- The Jack Benny Program
- The Jeffersons
- The Jerry Lewis MDA Labor Day Telethon (1995–2004)
- The Joker's Wild
- The Judy Garland Show
- Kids Say the Darndest Things
- The Larry Elder Show
- Late Show with David Letterman (May 9–13, 1994; November 6–10, 1995)
- The Late Late Show (1995–2023)
  - ... with Tom Snyder (1995–1999)
  - ... with Craig Kilborn (1999–2004)
  - ... with Craig Ferguson (2005–2014)
  - ... with James Corden (2015–2023)
- The Lawrence Welk Show (1977–79)
- Live to Dance
- Love Connection (2017–2018)
- Mama's Family
- The Masked Singer (2019–2020)
- Match Game
- Matchmaker
- Maude
- Me and the Boys
- Meet Millie
- The Merv Griffin Show
- The Mike Douglas Show
- The Montel Williams Show
- Morris Cerullo Help Line
- My Friend Irma
- Now You See It
- One Day at a Time (1975–1984)
- Osbournes Reloaded (2008–2009)
- Password
- The Pat Sajak Show
- Pet Star
- Pictionary
- Playboy After Dark
- Playhouse 90
- Politically Incorrect
- Press Your Luck (1983–1986, 2019–2020, 2022, 2024–2025)
- The Price Is Right (1972–2023)
- Real Time with Bill Maher
- The Red Skelton Show
- Rock Star: INXS/Supernova
- Rodeo Drive
- The Ropers
- The Roseanne Show
- Rove LA
- Show Me the Money (2006)
- Skating with the Stars (2010)
- Slide Show
- The Smothers Brothers Comedy Hour
- So You Think You Can Dance (2005–2019; 2022)
- The Sonny & Cher Comedy Hour
- Spin-Off
- The Steve Harvey Show
- Stockard Channing in Just Friends
- Stump the Stars
- Survivor (finales and reunions)
- Talking Bad
- Talking Dead
- Talking Preacher
- Talking Saul
- Tattletales
- That's My Line
- That's My Mama
- There's One in Every Family
- Three's Company
- Tic-Tac-Dough
- Tony Orlando and Dawn
- To Tell the Truth
- The Twilight Zone
- 3rd Degree
- The Tyra Banks Show (2005–2007)
- Vibe
- Video Village
- Weakest Link
- Welcome Back, Kotter
- Wheel of Fortune (1989–1995)
- Whew!
- Wild 'n Out
- Win, Lose or Draw
- The World's Best
- The X Factor (2011–2013)
- Xuxa
- The Young and the Restless
- You Don't Know Jack
