= Disneyland Hotel (California) =

Hotel at Disneyland Resort

Coordinates: 33°48′29″N 117°55′37″W

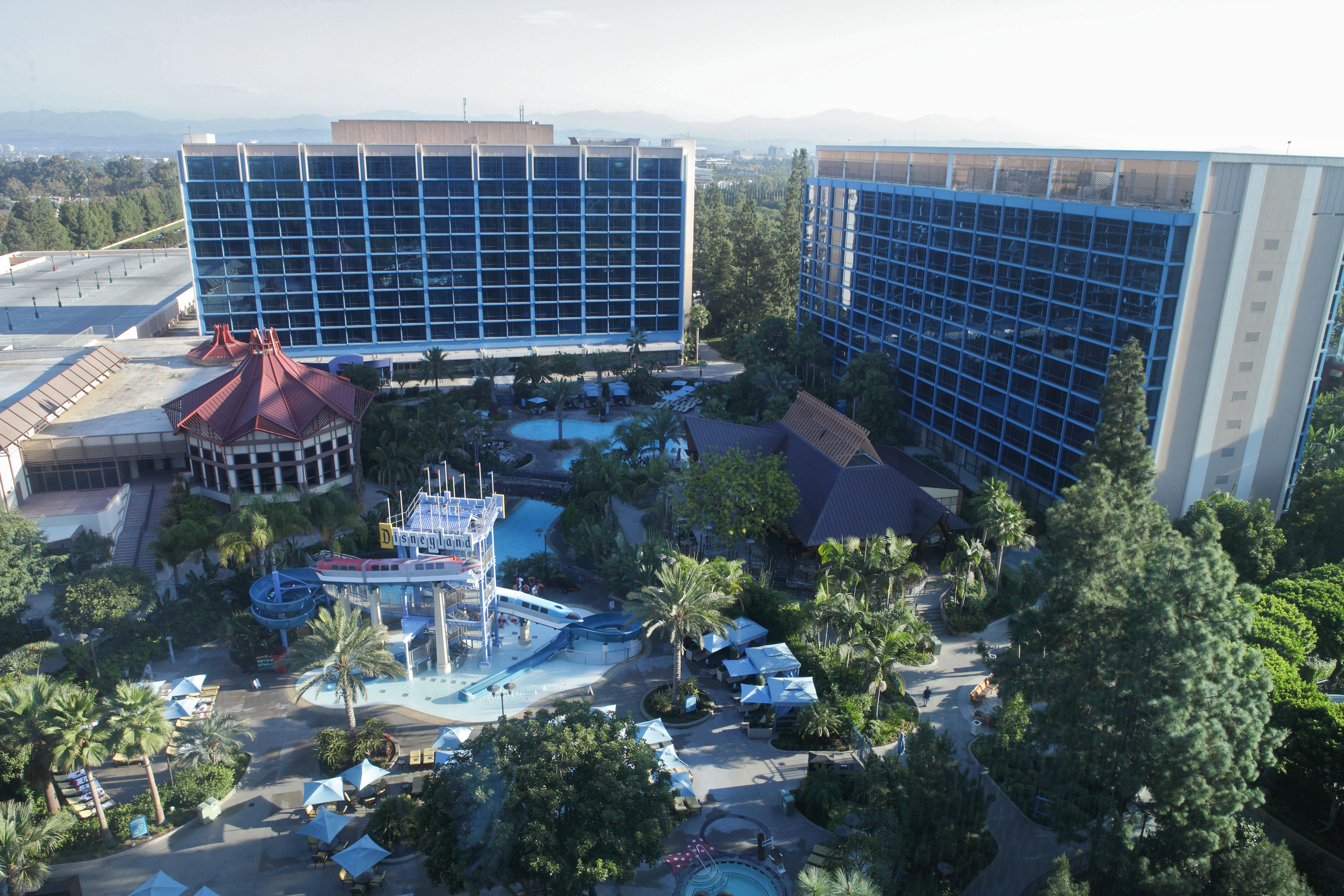
- The Disneyland Hotel’s Fantasy Tower (left) and Adventure Tower (right) as seen from the Frontier Tower

General information
- Type: Resort
- Location: Disneyland Resort, Anaheim, California, United States
- Opened: October 5, 1955; 70 years ago
- Operator: Disney Experiences

Other information
- Number of rooms: 930
- Number of suites: 60

The Disneyland Hotel is a resort hotel located at the Disneyland Resort in Anaheim, California, owned by the Walt Disney Company and operated through their Experiences division. Opened on October 5, 1955, as a motor inn owned and operated by Jack Wrather under an agreement with Walt Disney, the hotel was the first to officially bear the Disney name. Under Wrather's ownership, the hotel underwent several expansions and renovations over the years before being acquired by Disney in 1988. The hotel was downsized to its present capacity in 1999 as part of the Disneyland Resort expansion.

== History ==
=== Concept and construction ===
At the time of its construction in the mid-1950s, Disneyland was in a remote area outside Anaheim, California. Walt Disney wanted to build a hotel for Disneyland visitors to stay overnight, since Disneyland was quite a drive from the established population centers of Southern California at the time, but Disney's financial resources were significantly depleted by the construction of the park. Initially he tried to interest his friend Art Linkletter in building the hotel, but Linkletter declined. At the time, Linkletter was hesitant about the prospects of the park (only ruefully years later to walk along the sidewalk in front of the property while telling himself with each step "And that's another million I missed out on"). Disney also contacted Hilton and Sheraton Hotels but because they had no idea where Anaheim was at the time, they declined. Disney then sought out and negotiated a deal with Jack Wrather and his business partner Maria Helen Alvarez under which Wrather-Alvarez Productions would own and operate a hotel called the Disneyland Hotel across the street from Disneyland. Jack Wrather was a Texas oil millionaire turned film producer who already owned hotels in Las Vegas and Palm Springs, and co-owned television stations in Tulsa and San Diego with Alvarez.

=== Wrather Corporation ownership (1955–1988) ===
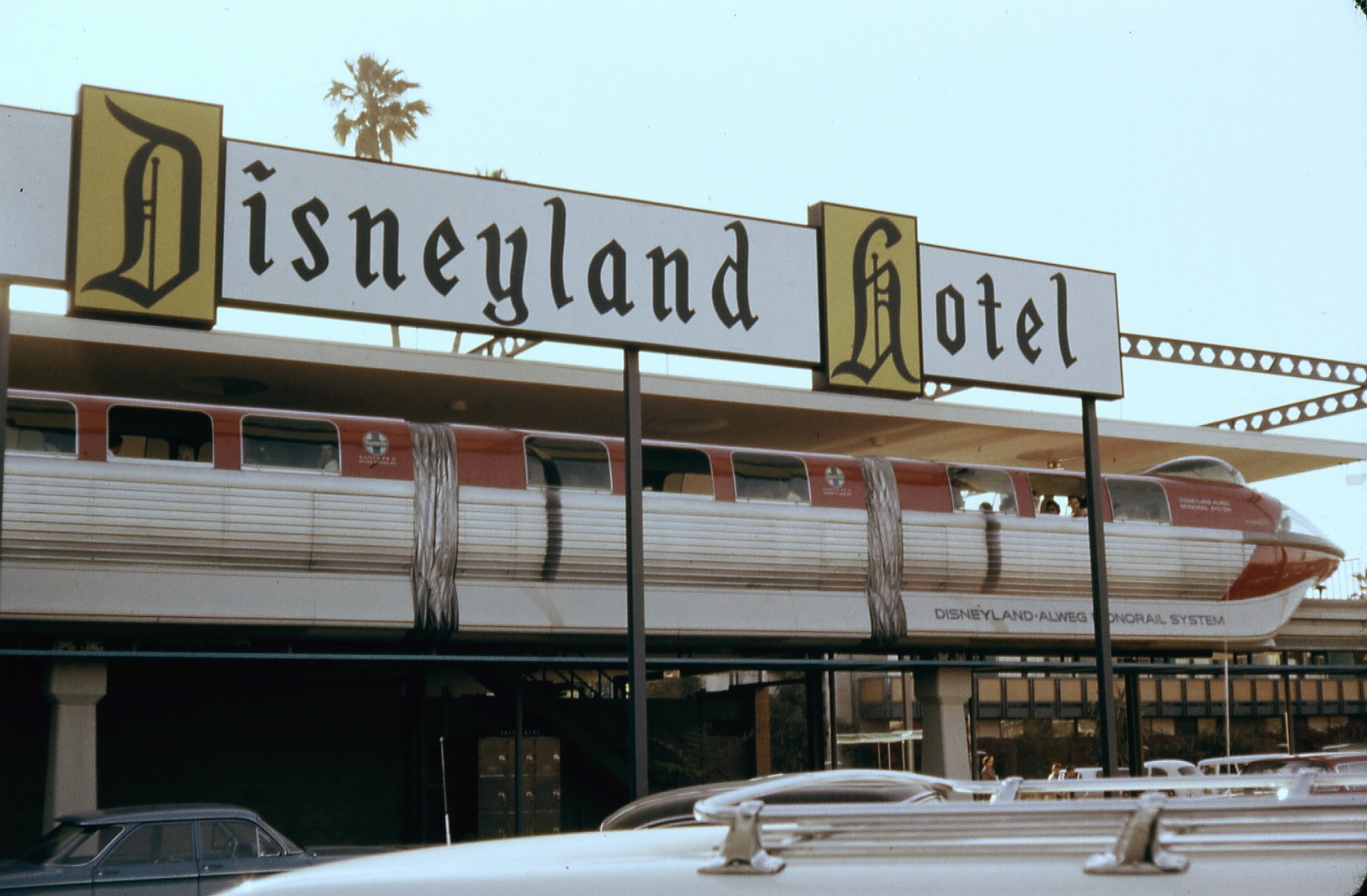
Disneyland Monorail train at the Disneyland Hotel station in August 1963

The original Disneyland Hotel was designed by the firm of Pereira & Luckman and opened on October 5, 1955, nearly three months after Disneyland. Various strikes caused the opening to be postponed from the August date advertised in pre-opening promotional materials, and the hotel only had limited capacity when it initially opened. The hotel originally consisted of just over 100 rooms in 5 two-story guest room complexes (later known as the South Garden Rooms and even later as the Oriental Gardens) that rented for $15 a night ($180 in 2025 dollars); shopping, dining and recreational facilities were added in early 1956. In addition, it had a doctor and a dentist on site, as well as a hairdresser and a beauty salon.

On August 25, 1956, the hotel celebrated its "official" grand opening with many Hollywood stars and celebrities attending the festivities. It was quickly expanded in 1956 with three North Garden guest room structures, one more North Garden structure in 1958 and lastly, two more North garden structures in 1960. The hotel now boasted over 300 guest rooms and suites. It was one of the first hotels in the region to offer accommodations for four persons per room.

When the Wrather-Alvarez partnership ended acrimoniously in 1958, Jack Wrather bought Alvarez' share of Wrather-Alvarez Hotels, making him sole owner of the Disneyland Hotel. Over the years, the hotel was expanded to include three guest room towers: Sierra (1962; expanded 1966), Marina (1970), and Bonita (1978). The third tower that was opened on the southwest side of the property was named after Jack Wrather's wife, Academy Award nominated actress Bonita Granville. A large waterfall was featured just in front of the tower where guests could walk through caves that were under the waterfalls. Just beyond the waterfall area was an area called Seaports of the Pacific that featured shops with unique products from around the world. That area also featured The Shipyard Inn seafood restaurant and The Wharf Bar with live nightly entertainment. At the Southwest side of Seaports of the Pacific was the Fantasy Water Show that had two 20 minute shows nightly, one at 8pm and one at 9pm. In 1982, The Off-Road Raceway opened in front of the Bonita Tower and featured 1/10 scale remote cars that could be rented by guests. In 1985, The Queen's Berth remote control boat attraction opened in Marina area between the Marina Tower and the Sierra Tower and featured a scale replica of the Queen Mary that was owned and operated in Long Beach, California, by the Wrather Corporation at the time.

Guests traveled between the hotel and the Disneyland Park main entrance via a tram. The Disneyland Monorail was extended from its original 1959 configuration and a station opened at the hotel in 1961 (pictured above). Recreational areas, attractions, and a convention center (1972) were also added over the years. On June 15, 1970 an adjacent recreation vehicle park called Vacationland opened (which had its own pool and clubhouse) which can be seen as a precursor to Disney's Fort Wilderness Resort & Campground which opened at Walt Disney World in 1971. The hotel also featured a Richfield service station for several years as part of Richfield's sponsorship of several Disneyland attractions, including Autopia.

=== Disney purchase from the Wrather Corporation ===
When Michael Eisner became chairman and CEO of Walt Disney Productions in 1984, he wanted to get out of Disney's agreement with the Wrather Corporation and bring the Disneyland Hotel under the Walt Disney Company's umbrella. Wrather refused to sell, just as he had refused Walt Disney many years before. Wrather died two months after Eisner took over at Disney, and in 1988, after Wrather's widow Bonita Granville died, Disney bought the entire Wrather company. At the time Wrather's company also owned the rights to The Lone Ranger and the Lassie TV series, and managed and operated the RMS Queen Mary and Spruce Goose combined tourist attraction in Long Beach. Though Disney kept the hotel, it has since sold the other assets that came with the purchase.

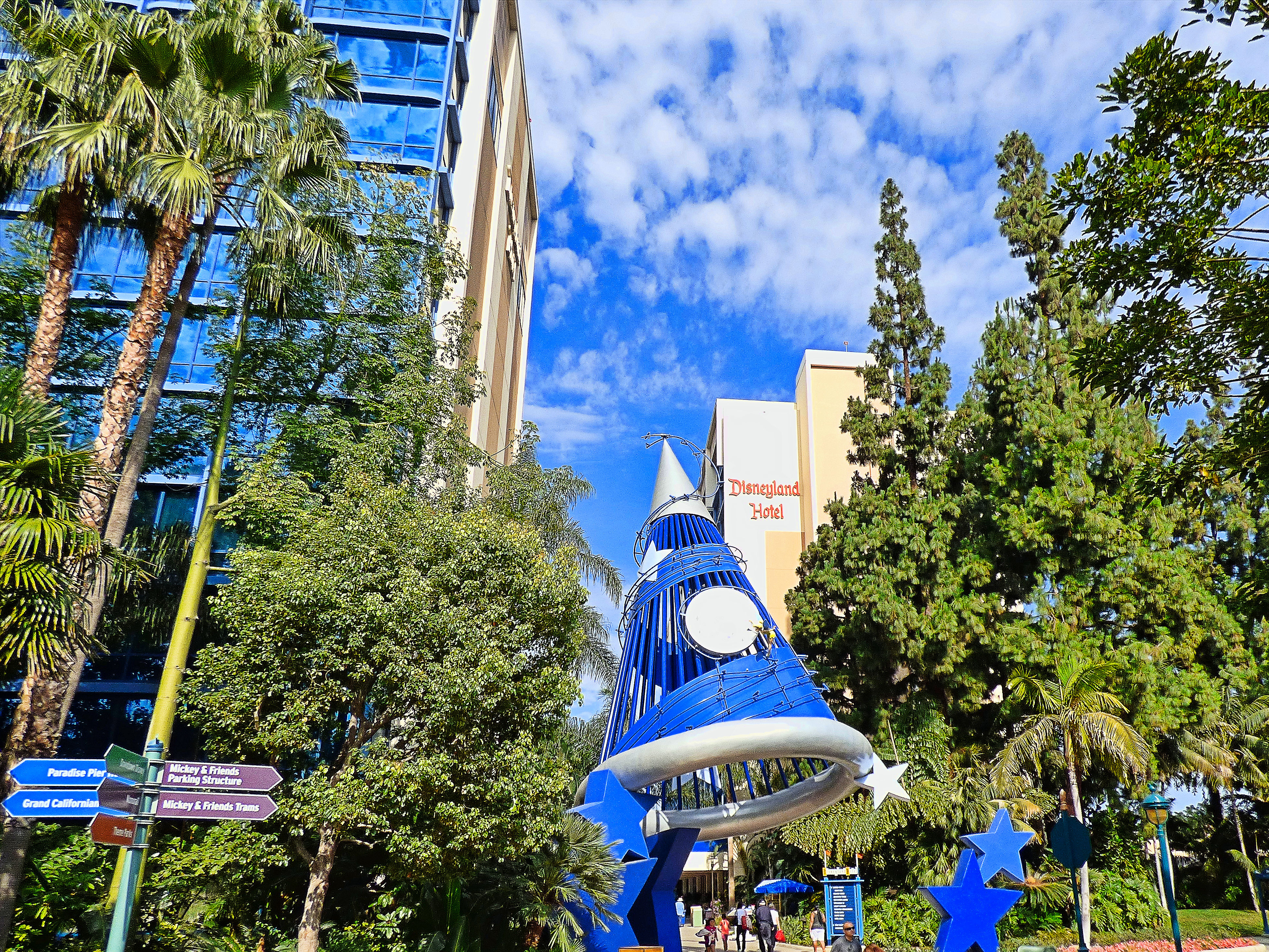
Disneyland Hotel towers from Downtown Disney. Dreams Tower is at left; Magic Tower at right. The area in foreground was previously the site of the Plaza Building.

=== Resort expansion (1999–2001) ===
In early 1997, Vacationland was closed and demolished. Then in 1999, a significant portion of the hotel was also demolished, all to make way for Downtown Disney and parking areas for the newly expanding Disneyland Resort. Most buildings east of the Sierra Tower and north of the Marina Tower were demolished, including the original hotel buildings from 1955. The only buildings remaining in these areas are the convention center and parking garage. Recreational facilities were built in the quad between the three towers, previously site of the Water Wonderland, to replace those that were previously located east of the Sierra Tower.

Streets previously used to access the hotel by car were regraded and/or outright eliminated, and a new street was built to access the hotel. Tram service from the hotel was also discontinued, leaving the Monorail as the only vehicular mode of transportation from park to hotel. The loss of hotel rooms was offset with the opening of Disney's Grand Californian Hotel in 2001, but many of the restaurants and amenities that existed prior to 1999 were never replaced.

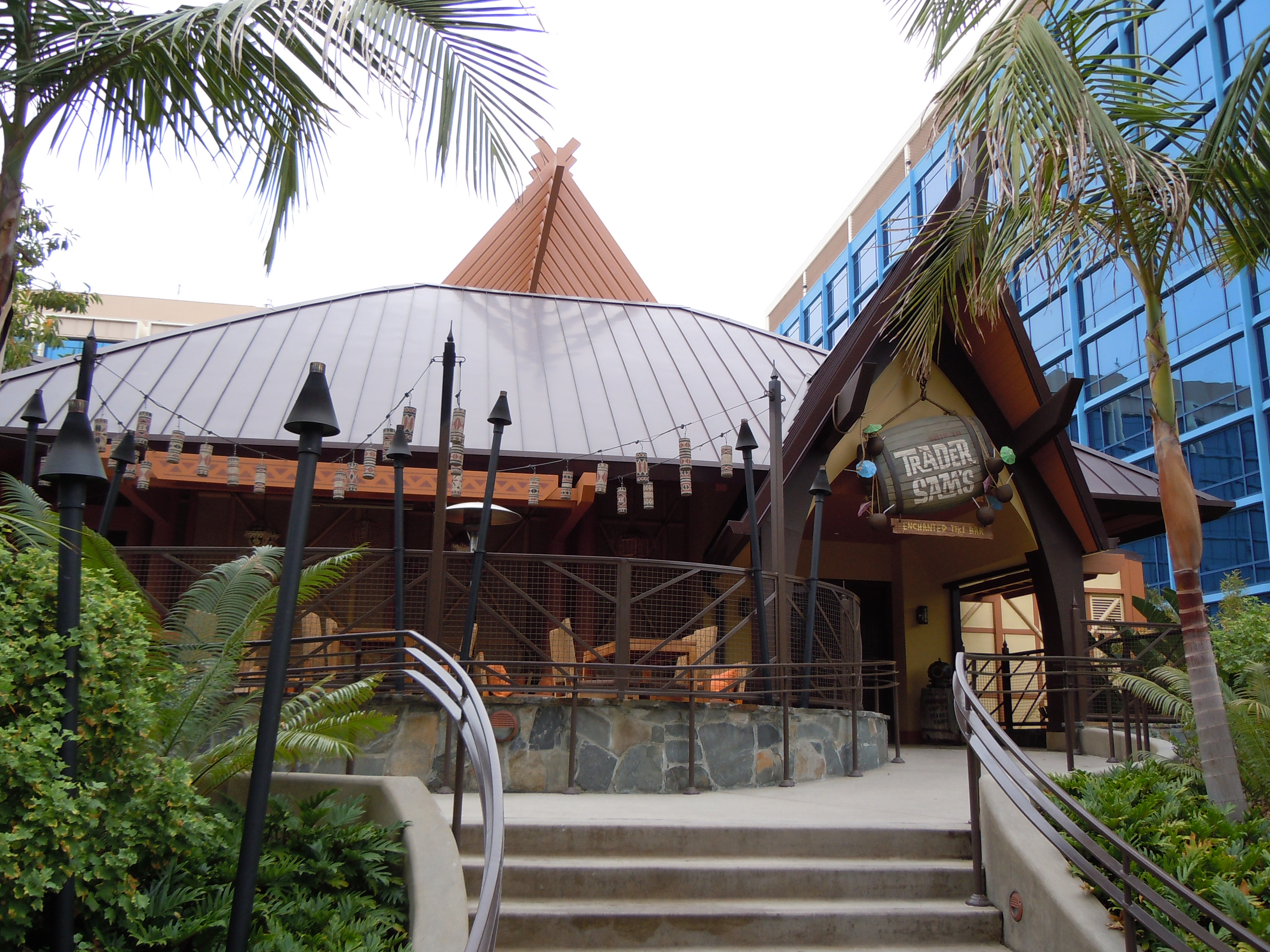
Trader Sam's Enchanted Tiki Bar at the Disneyland Hotel following the hotel renovation in 2012. To the right is the Adventure Tower with new blue windows.

=== Post-expansion ===
Today, none of the original hotel buildings from 1955 remain standing. Very little of the original hotel (other than parking areas and service facilities) survives, sitting outside of the perimeter created by the three remaining guest room towers. Original signs and other artifacts from several of the stores and restaurants demolished with the Plaza are on display in the hotel's employee cafeteria.

Mickey Mouse theming is employed in many interior furnishings and details. In 2007 the Marina, Sierra, and Bonita Towers were renamed Magic, Dreams, and Wonder, respectively. Other buildings in the sprawling hotel complex house restaurants, stores, offices, recreational facilities and convention and banquet facilities. The complex also features a gazebo and garden areas that are used for Disney's Fairy Tale Weddings & Honeymoons.

A new Downtown Disney Monorail Station was built on the same site as the old Disneyland Hotel station that takes guests to Tomorrowland inside Disneyland Park along the same beamway that existed prior to the 1999–2001 expansion.

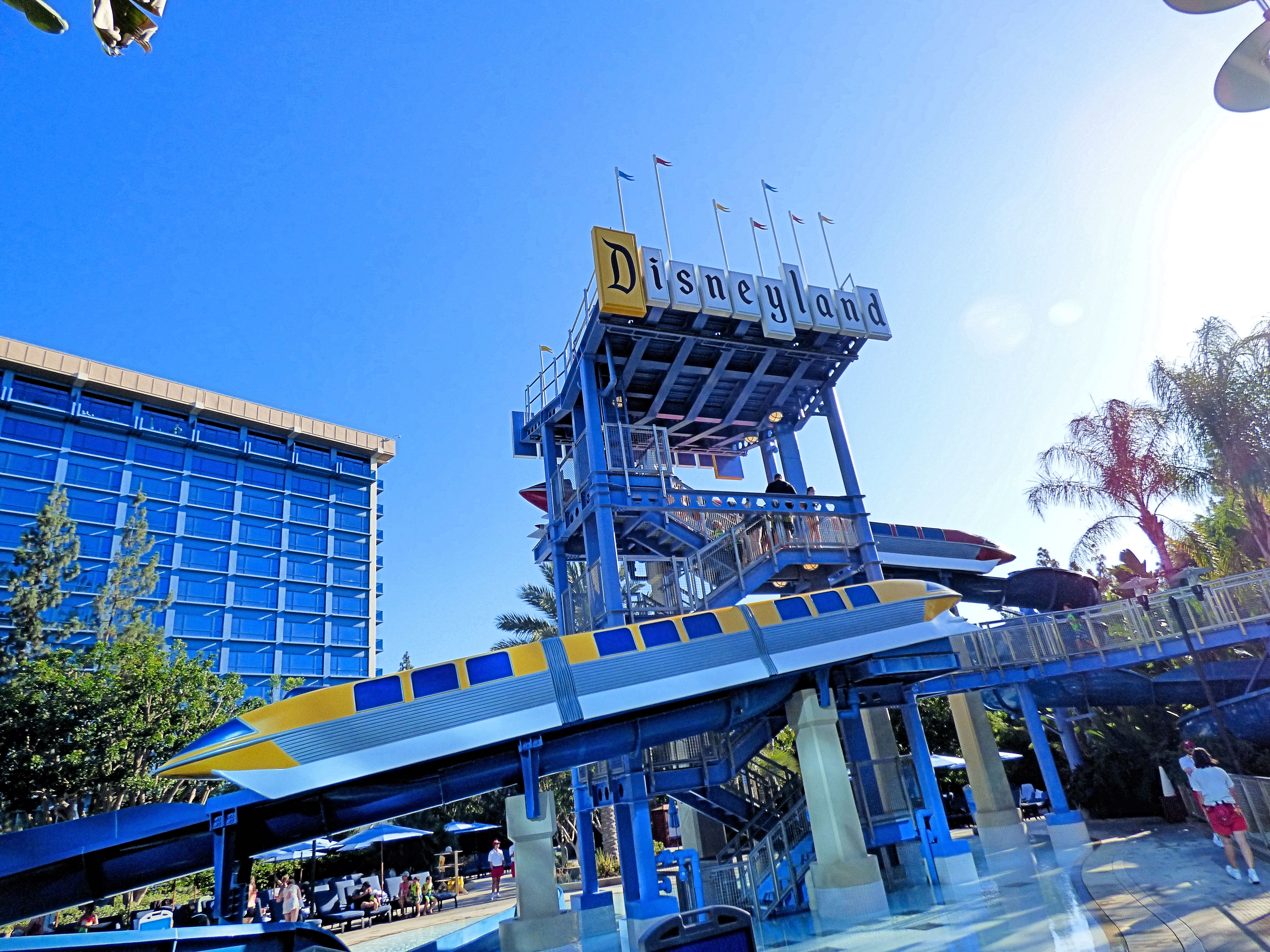
The Monorail Slide at the Disneyland Hotel

The Disneyland Hotel started a major renovation in 2009, beginning with the Dreams Tower. Renovation of the hotel included new windows, wallpaper, carpeting, and decor. The Dreams Tower, completed in 2010, became the Adventure Tower. The Wonder Tower became the Frontier Tower after its completion in 2011, and the Magic Tower became the Fantasy Tower in 2012.

The Never Land Pool area also received a redesign which was completed in 2012. The transformation included six new cabanas and two new water slides, featuring a replica of the original park signage at the top along with replicas of Mark I Monorails encasing both slides. A new four-foot pool was built between the former Never Land Pool and water play area.

=== The Villas at Disneyland Hotel ===
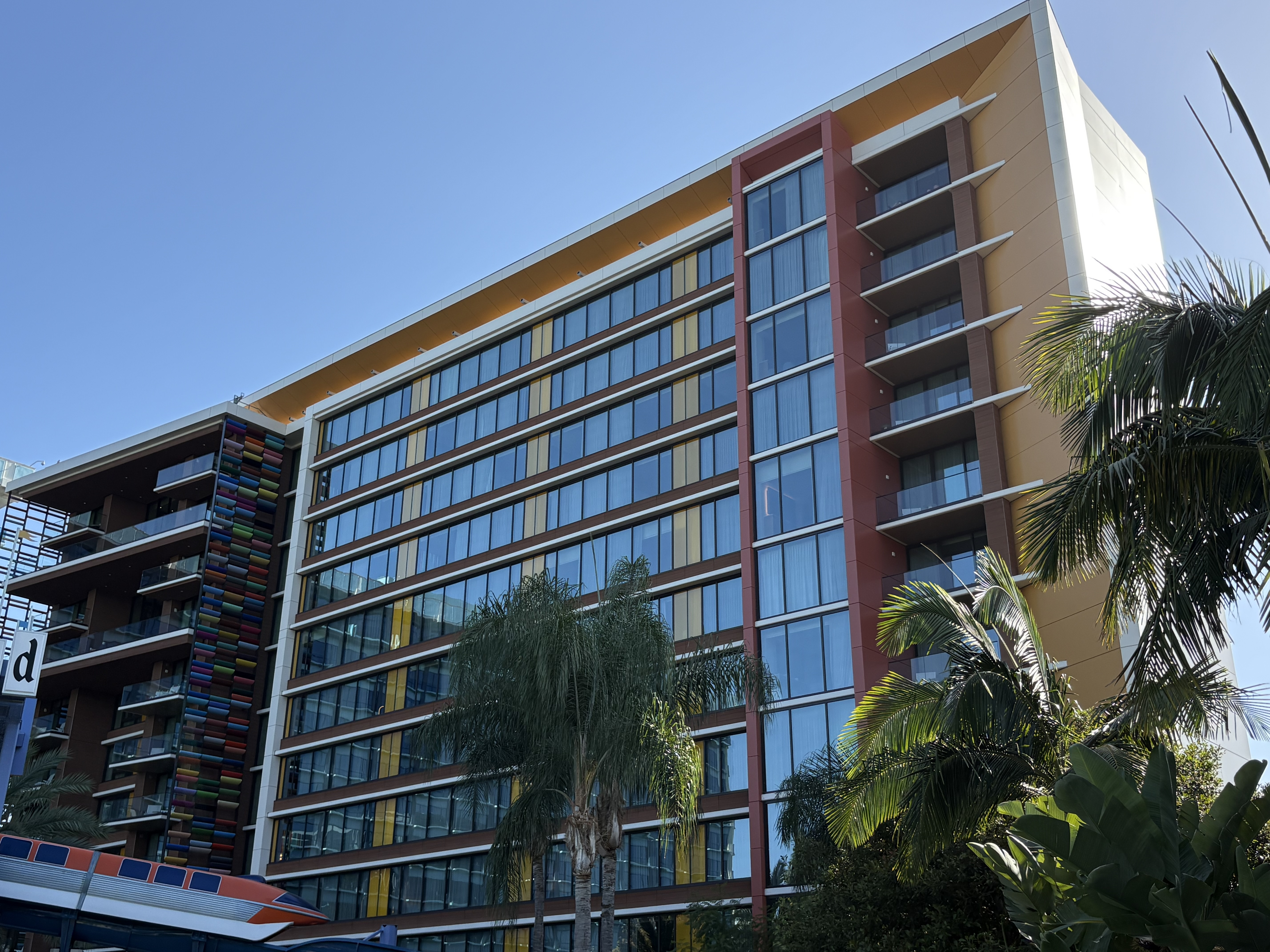
The Discovery Tower at the Disneyland Hotel

On September 28, 2023, Disney opened a new Disney Vacation Club property, The Villas at Disneyland Hotel, as part of the Disneyland Hotel complex. A 12-story tower, each of its 344 guest rooms feature various Disney films like The Jungle Book and Sleeping Beauty.

== See also ==
- Disney's Grand Californian Hotel & Spa
- Trader Sam's Enchanted Tiki Bar
- Downtown Disney
