= Harry Hershfield =

American cartoonist (1885–1974)

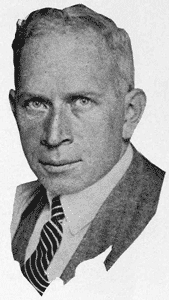

Shepherd of The Lambs
- In office 1966–1969
- Preceded by: Martin Begley
- Succeeded by: Jack Waldron

Personal details
- Born: Harry Hershfield; October 23, 1885 Cedar Rapids, Iowa, U.S.
- Died: December 16, 1974 (aged 89) New York, NY, U.S.
- Spouse: Sarah Jane Isdell Hershfield
- Occupation: Broadcaster * Cartoonist
- Known for: Toastmaster

Harry Hershfield (October 13, 1885 – December 15, 1974) was an American cartoonist, humor writer and radio personality. He was known as "the Jewish Will Rogers". Hershfield also was a columnist for the New York Daily Mirror. His books include Laugh Louder, Live Longer and Now I'll Tell One. As a comics artist he is best remembered for his newspaper comic Abie the Agent.

== Biography ==
He was born in Cedar Rapids, Iowa, on October 13, 1885, to Jewish immigrants.

He studied in Chicago at the Frank Holmes School of Illustration and the Chicago Art Institute. His career began at age 14, drawing sports cartoons and his comic strip about a dog, Homeless Hector, for the Chicago Daily News in 1899. He then went West, drawing for the San Francisco Chronicle by 1907. He married Sarah Jane Isdell (?-1960).

In 1909, he was hired by Arthur Brisbane to work for William Randolph Hearst's New York Evening Journal. He switched to the New York Graphic where he drew If I'm Wrong, Sue Me!, and when the Graphic folded, he went to the New York Herald Tribune and drew Meyer the Buyer.

During the 1930s, Hershfield was in demand as a banquet toastmaster, averaging some 200 banquets and dinners annually. During his lifetime, he was toastmaster or master of ceremonies at an estimated 16,000 events, including charity affairs, dinners and stage benefits.

Involved in a legal battle with Hearst from 1933 to 1935, Hershfield drew a Sunday half-page, According to Hoyle, for the New York Herald-Tribune during those years.

On March 11, 1938, he was signed to manage the story department of Metro-Goldwyn-Mayer's cartoon department, due to Fred Quimby attempting to improve the studio's output with comic strip artists. This failed initiative also brought Milt Gross, who directed two cartoons before leaving; Hershfield completed no cartoons, and the extent of his involvement is not known. He later commented, "They were so glad to welcome me, the day I arrived they gave me a farewell dinner."

He began radio work with a program named One Man's Opinion on WMCA. The 15-minute program broadcast at midnight featured a "breezy review of shows he just left". Soon after he brought Abie the Agent to an end during 1940, he became a well-known radio personality, telling jokes on the programs Stop Me If You've Heard This One and Can You Top This? He was a frequent guest of early television programs during the 1950s.

On February 15, 1950, Harry Hershfield's Talent Search debuted on WNBT-TV in New York City. Hershfield was master of ceremonies on the program, which had winners from local amateur talent contests competing for an engagement of one week at the Palace Theater.

He died on December 15, 1974, at Saint Clare's Hospital in Manhattan.

== Strip bibliography ==
Names and dates from Holtz's American Newspaper Comics: An Encyclopedic Reference Guide:

- War's Ebb and Flow (weekdays, Jan 3 - Feb 14, 1906) - Chicago Daily News
- Homeless Hector (weekdays, Jan 4, 1906 - Oct 20, 1908) - Chicago Daily News
- Bill Slowguy (weekdays, Feb 8, 1906 - Oct 19, 1908) - Chicago Daily News
- Christopher's Luck (weekdays, Oct 16 - Dec 23, 1907) - Chicago Daily News
- Adventures of a Fly (weekdays, Nov 4 - Dec 3, 1907) - Chicago Daily News
- Tiny Tinkles (weekdays, Jan 7-16, 1908) - Chicago Daily News
- The Luck of Christopher (weekdays, Feb 18 - June 2, 1908) - Chicago Daily News
- The Fortune Teller (weekdays, Apr 15 - Sept 16, 1908) - Chicago Daily News
- The Piker's Rubaiyat (daily, Nov 11 - Dec 26, 1908) - San Francisco Chronicle
- Raffles (daily, May 6–23, 1909) - San Francisco Chronicle
- Desperate Desmond (daily, March 11, 1910 - Oct 15, 1912) - National News Association
- Little Phillip (weekdays, 1911) - New York Journal
- Dauntless Durham of the USA (daily, Jan 22, 1913 - Jan 31, 1914) - Hearst Syndicate
- Abie the Agent (daily/Sundays, Feb 12, 1914 - 1940) - International Feature Syndicate for 1914-1932, King Features Syndicate for 1935-1940
- Hard Hearted Hickey (daily, Nov 6, 1927 - March 12, 1928, written as Darrell McClure) - Premier Syndicate
- Vanilla and the Villains (daily, Sept 10, 1928 - 1930, written as Darrell McClure) - King Features Syndicate
- Meyer the Buyer (daily/Sundays, Feb 15 - May 9, 1932) - New York Graphic
- According to Hoyle (Sundays, March 4, 1934 - July 28, 1935) - New York Tribune

Sunday toppers for Abie the Agent:

- Homeless Hector (reprise) (1912, 1927-1932)
- Dictated But Not Read (1926)
- Phooy Phables (1926)

== Legacy ==
Ron Goulart, in Encyclopedia of American Comics, described Hershfield's cartoon humor:

Hershfield drew in a vigorous, primitive cartoon style, and was enormously fond of shading, crosshatching and other basic inking techniques. Occasionally, he favored collages and sometimes made fun of other artists styles. In 1910, he started Desperate Desmond, a humorous continuity strip burlesquing melodramas, dime novels, and fiction weeklies that went in for the hairbreadth rescue and gloating villain sort of material. In addition to the villainous, top-hatted Desmond, the strip featured the stalwart Claude Éclair and the put-upon blond heroine, Rosamond. Hershfield's enthusiastic kidding of this sort of cliffhanger hokum did little to sour the public on its conventions. However, within a few years, such motion picture serials as The Exploits of Elaine and The Perils of Pauline would be attracting audiences to movie houses by doing the stuff completely straight.

In 1912, Hershfield switched heroes and introduced a new strip called Dauntless Durham of the U.S.A. Durham, a handsome, pipe-smoking combination of Sherlock Holmes, Nick Carter and Frank Merriwell, was the soul of honor and polite to a fault. The object of his affection was the beautiful Katrina. In 1914, Hershfield abandoned parody for a quieter sort of humor and created Abie the Agent. The strip continued until 1940 and dealt with contemporary Jewish life in a big city. Hershfield specialized in gags with a Yiddish flavor.

The character was animated for the movie Abie Kabibble Outwitted a Rival (1917).

== Gallery ==
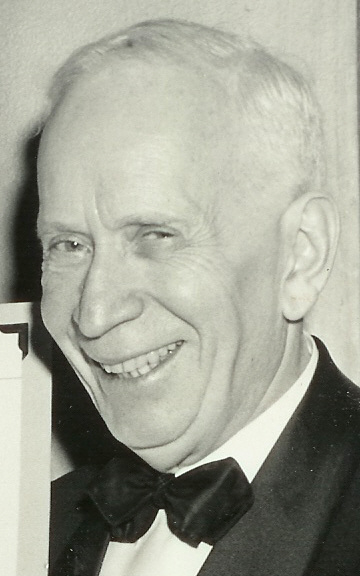
December 1, 1951

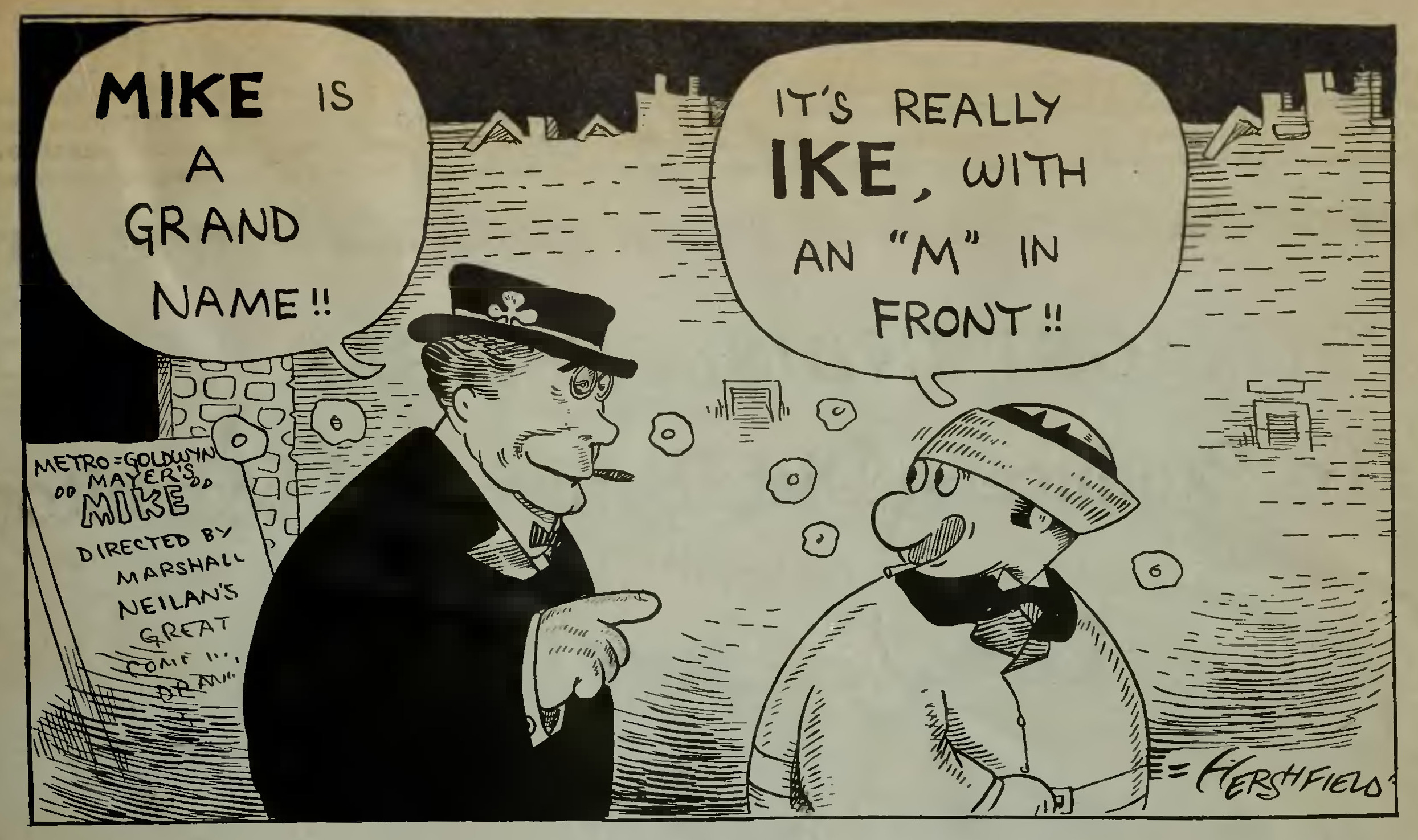
Hershfield comic art from "Mike" movie ad in The Film Daily, 1926

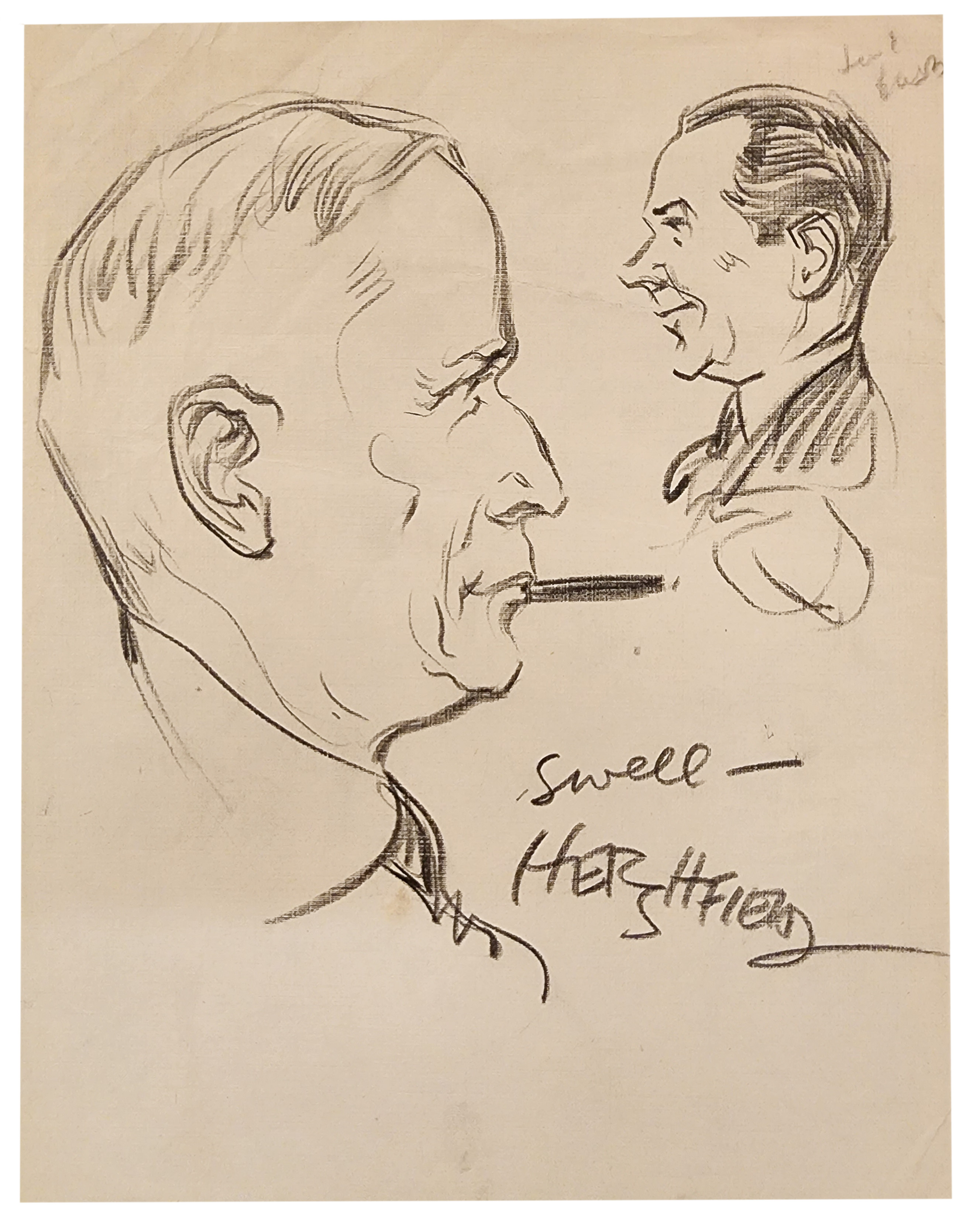
Signed drawing of Harry Hershfield by Manuel Rosenberg 1926

Can Your Top This, with Senator Ford and Joe Laurie Jr.
