= Joe Laurie Jr. =

American vaudeville monologist (1892–1954)

Joe Laurie Jr. (February 24, 1892 – April 29, 1954) was an American vaudeville monologist who later performed on radio and on Broadway. He was born in New York City.

On radio he was one of the comedic panelists on the popular joke-telling series, Can You Top This? with Edward Hastings Ford. He also portrayed the character of Sniffy on the Mutual daytime drama, We Were Always Young.

== Books ==
Laurie's jokes were part of Cream of the Crop (Grosset and Dunlap, 1947) along with other members of the Can You Top This? team. He collaborated with Abel Green on the show business history, Show Biz: From Vaude to Video (1951) and then followed with his memoir, Vaudeville: From the Honky-Tonks to the Palace (1953).

== Family ==
Laurie's first wife was his vaudeville partner, Aleen Bronson, in the act, Laurie & Bronson. During the 1940s, Laurie and his second wife, Nellie Butcher (1922–1954), stage named June Tempest, lived in Manhattan. He was survived by his son, Joseph Bryant Hughes Laurie.

Joe Laurie Jr. died in New York City in 1954, aged 63, from undisclosed causes.
