= Desperate Desmond =

Comic strip by Harry Hershfield

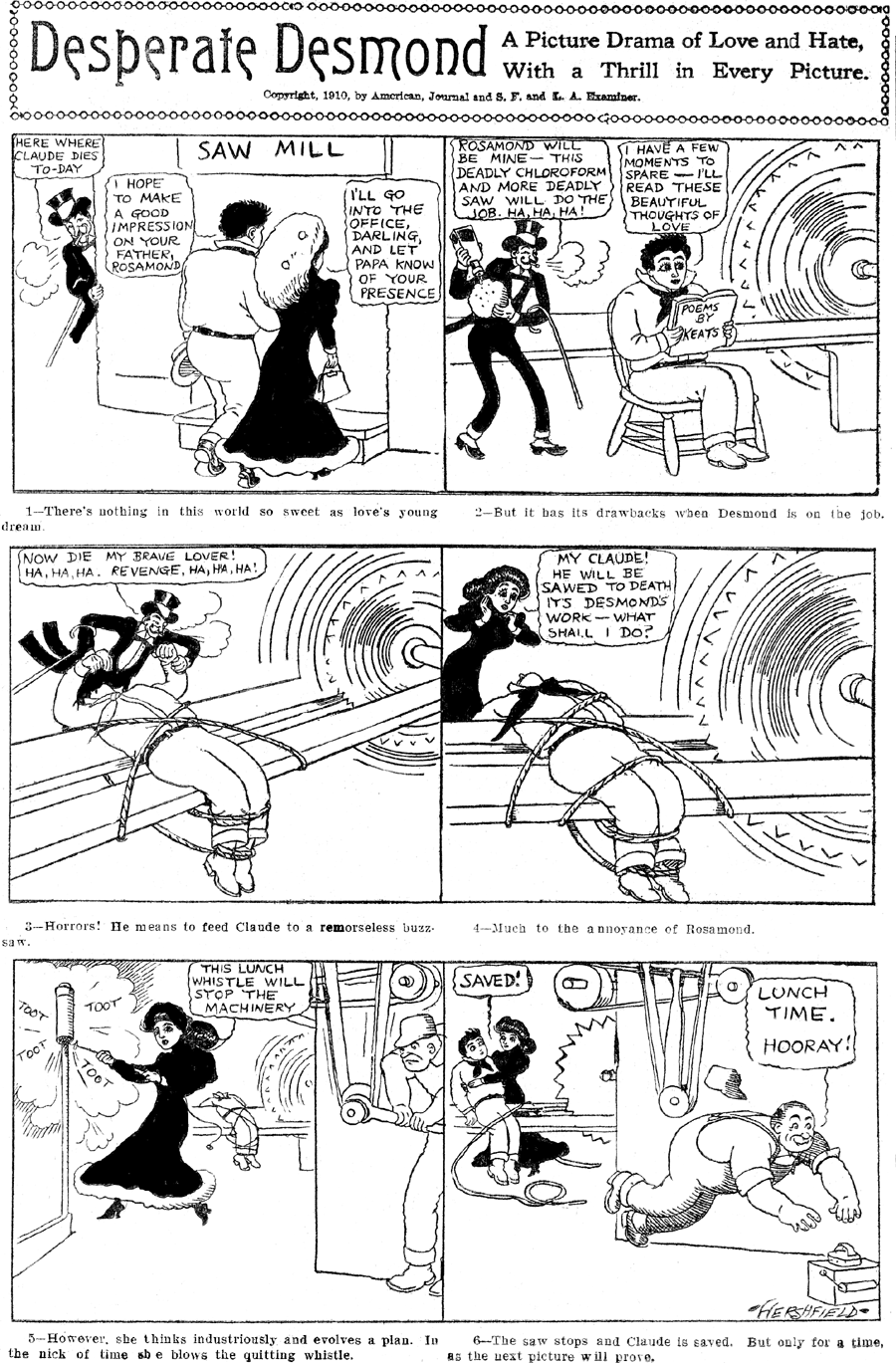
Installment of "Desperate Desmond" from 1910

"Desperate Desmond" was a comic strip by Harry Hershfield, published in the New York Journal between March 11, 1910, and October 15, 1912.

A parody of melodrama, it depicted a stereotypical villain named Desmond who continually tried to capture a damsel in distress named Rosamond, which brought him into conflict with her and her paramour Claude Eclaire; Hershfield ended the strip by having Claude and Rosamond marry, which meant that Desmond could no longer pursue her.

Coulton Waugh described it as one of the first strips to include genuine suspense; similarly, R. C. Harvey has mentioned its early use of daily continuity.

Don Markstein noted that it was a "probably a response" to the presence of a similar character in C. W. Kahles's earlier strip "Hairbreadth Harry"; Maurice Horn, however, called it a "direct imitation" of Kahles's work, but felt that it "showed greater ingenuity and wit".

== Adaptations ==
Film adaptations of "Desperate Desmond" were produced by Nestor Studios, directed by Tom Ricketts, with Dorothy Davenport as Rosamond and Fred Kelsey as Claude; as well, vaudeville star Fred Duprez released a recording of a "Desperate Desmond"-based comedy act.
