= Tom Van Sant =

American artist

- Born: February 26, 1931
- Died: March 6, 2023 (aged 92); Guadalajara, Mexico
- Education: Stanford University; Otis College of Art and Design
- Known for: sculpture; space art

Tom Rowley Van Sant (February 26, 1931 – March 6, 2023) was an American sculptor, painter and conceptual artist. In his professional work he executed 77 major sculpture and mural commissions for public spaces around the world. These include the international airports of Honolulu, Taipei and Los Angeles, the civic centers of Los Angeles, Newport Beach and Inglewood, and corporate centers in Taiwan, Manila, Salt Lake City, Dallas, Honolulu and San Francisco. He is best known for his digital artwork and map, The Earth from Space, which was the first satellite composite map of the Earth, free of clouds. Completed in 1990, it broke cartographic precedent.

== Biography ==
Tom Rowley Van Sant was born on February 26, 1931. He graduated from Stanford University, and Otis Art Institute of Los Angeles County with an MFA. While at Stanford he joined Delta Kappa Epsilon fraternity. He had a long association with architect William Pereira and his work has adorned over a dozen Pereira buildings. Van Sant has had fifteen one-man exhibits in the United States, Europe and Australia. His art is represented in public and private collections throughout the world.

Van Sant's professional skills and intellectual interests range to architectural design, city planning, art education and advanced technical invention. His large scale conceptual art projects of the 1980s led to the creation of The Earth from Space image in 1990, and subsequently The GeoSphere Project, an ambitious environmental display system, using the Earth from Space, designed to illustrate the issues of Earth resource management.

The Earth from Space Image marks a milestone in cartographic history. It is the first satellite map of the Earth, showing the real world as it appears from space. The work required one year of effort on the world's most powerful graphics computers by Van Sant, technical director Lloyd Van Warren of Jet Propulsion Laboratory, and assisted by Jim Knighton and Leo Blume. Using multiple whole-Earth mosaics collected by Advanced Very High Resolution Radiometer (AVHRR) sensors on board TIROS-N (Television and InfraRed Observation Satellite Next generation) satellites, the composite was derived from over 2,000 images with a ground resolution of 4.6 km (2.9 mi). The project required ten months of software development and both interactive and non-interactive methods of creating the mosaics using a Stardent GS1000 Graphics Supercomputer – then amongst the most powerful machines of its type. The image was first published as the title page of the 1990 National Geographic World Atlas.

In 1992, Mr. Van Sant created an installation called "the Earth Situation Room", an interactive project which featured visualizations of earth systems and changes. This project was first shown at ECO-92, the Earth Summit, in Rio de Janeiro.

Al Gore cited Mr. Van Sant for his beautiful and useful 3D image of the Earth in the film An Inconvenient Truth.

In the summer of 2007 he participated in the Chicago public art exhibition "Cool Globes: Hot Ideas for a Cooler Planet."

Van Sant died in Guadalajara, Mexico on March 6, 2023, at the age of 92.

== Sources ==
- Radford, Georgia and Radford, Warren; Sculpture in the Sun, Hawaii's Art for Open Spaces, University of Hawaii Press, 1978, 18–20, 97.
- International Cartographic Association (ICA), ICA Commission on Map Design
- New Scientist article from 1990
- Smithsonian Archive of American Art, Oral History History Interview with Tom Van Sant, 2008 August 14- September 10
