= List of William Pereira buildings =

This is a list of buildings designed in whole or in part by architect William Pereira. They are listed by year and grouped into the three firms that Pereira belonged to. The first firm listed was based in Chicago, and the rest were in Los Angeles.

== Holabird & Root / William L. Pereira ==
=== 1931 ===
- Armour & Company Exhibit Building, Chicago
- Armour & Company Exhibit Building, San Francisco
- Armour & Company Exhibit Building, New York City
- Elgin Watch Company Industrial Plant, Chicago

=== 1938 ===
- Lake County Tuberculosis Sanatorium, Waukegan, Illinois

=== 1943 ===
- Pan Pacific Theatre, Los Angeles

=== 1945 ===
- Palms Theatre, Phoenix, Arizona (with Lescher & Mahoney) (demolished)

=== 1949 ===
- Panorama Theater, Panorama City, Los Angeles

=== 1950 ===
- Lake County General Hospital, Hobbs, New Mexico

== Pereira & Luckman ==
(partnership with Charles Luckman)

=== 1951 ===
- Farmers & Stockmen's Bank, Phoenix, Arizona
- Gibraltar Savings and Loan Headquarters, 9111 Wilshire Boulevard, Beverly Hills, California
- Robinson's department store, Beverly Hills (demolished)
- Robinson's department store (now Target), 777 E. Colorado Blvd, Pasadena, California

=== 1952 ===
- Avco Research Center, Wilmington, Massachusetts
- Beverly Hills Hotel Addition, Beverly Hills
- Doheny Office Building, Beverly Hills
- Hilton Hotels headquarters, Beverly Hills
- Lear Industrial plant, Santa Monica
- Luke Air Force Base, Phoenix, Arizona

=== 1953 ===
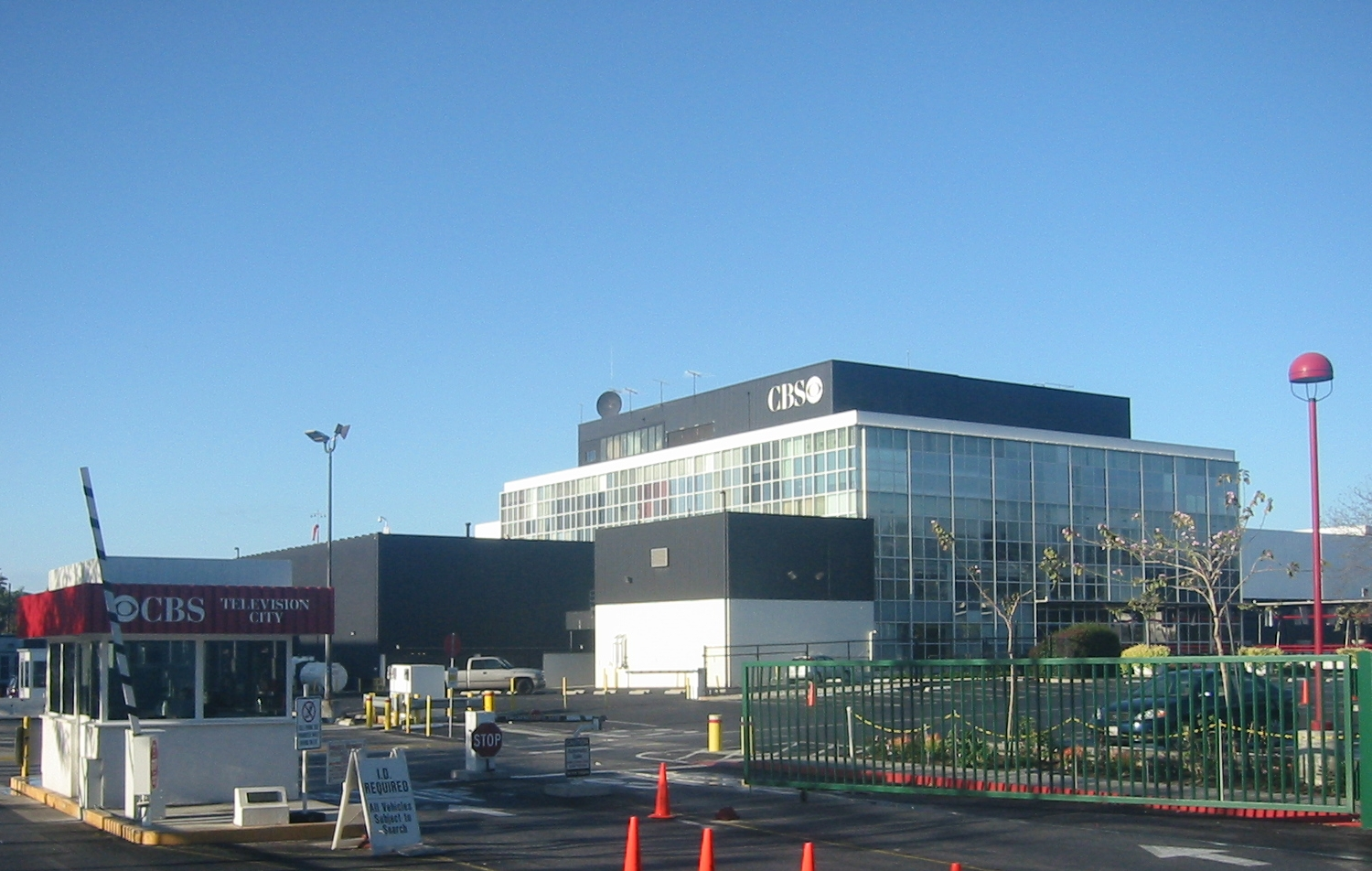
CBS Television City

- CBS Television City, Los Angeles
- Western Hydraulics plant, Van Nuys, California

=== 1954 ===
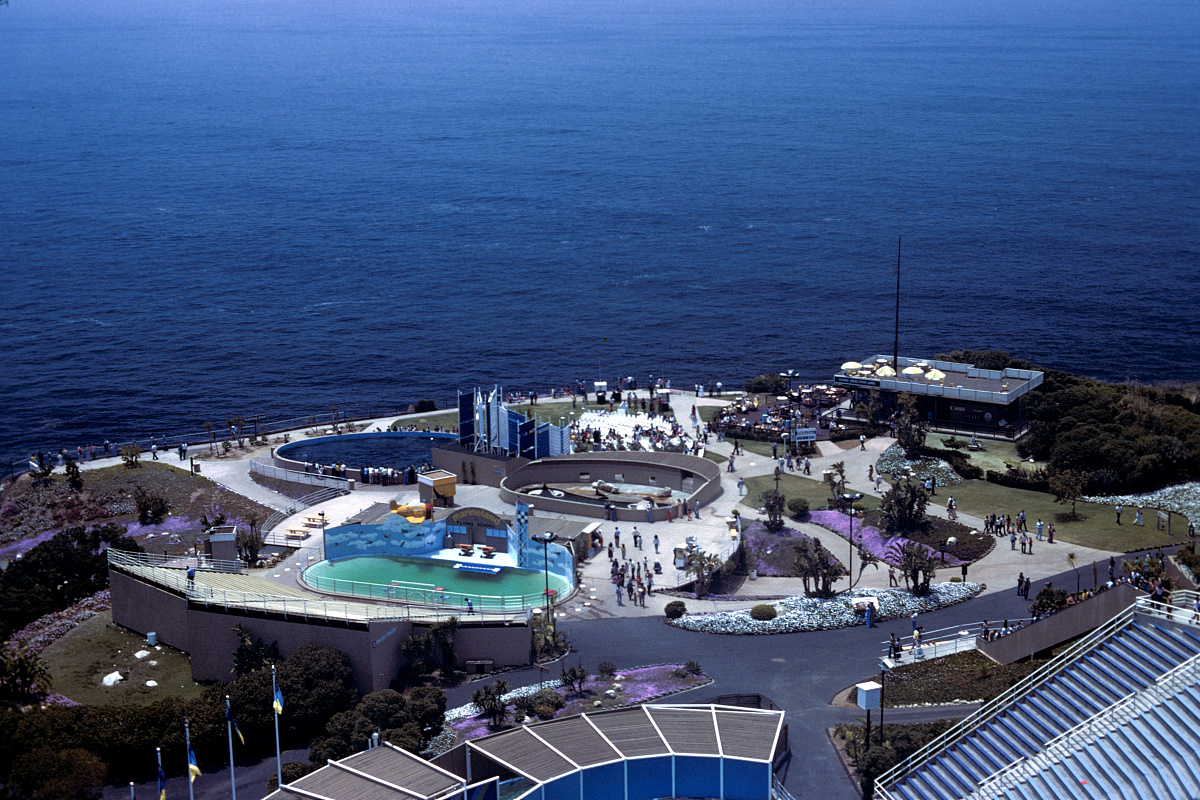
Marineland of the Pacific

- Electronics and Radio Propagation Research Laboratories, Camp Pendleton, Oceanside, California
- KEYT Television Station, Santa Barbara, California
- KTTV Television Station, Los Angeles (At the time, KTTV was headquartered at Metromedia Square, which has been demolished. Pereira project details are uncertain.)
- National Bureau of Standards building, Boulder, Colorado
- Santa Rosa Hall – Dormitory, University of California, Santa Barbara
- United States Navy training facility, San Diego, California
- Wadsworth General Hospital, Veteran's Administration, Los Angeles
- Western Hydraulics Plant 2, Van Nuys, California
- William H. Block Department Store, Indianapolis
- WSBT Television Station, South Bend, Indiana
- Marineland of the Pacific, Rancho Palos Verdes, California

=== 1955 ===
- Dormitories, Music and Science Buildings, Occidental College, Los Angeles
- Jet Production and Test Center, Palmdale, California
- Service Bureau Office Building, Los Angeles

=== 1956 ===
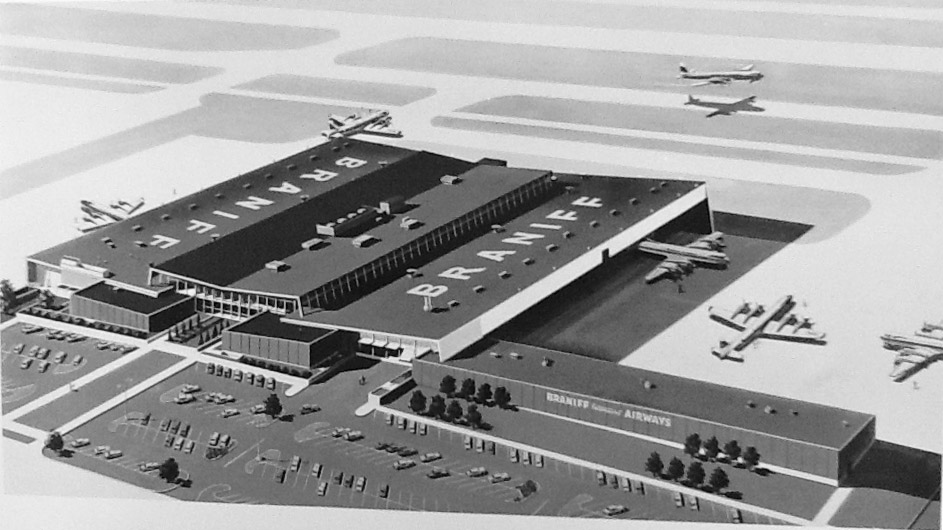
Braniff, Dallas Love Field

- Fallbrook Hospital, Fallbrook, California
- General Telephone Company Administration Building, Whittier, California
- Hunter Engineering plant, Riverside, California
- Prudential Tower, Boston (early designs)
- Southern California School of Theology, Claremont, California (now Claremont School of Theology)
- United States Air Force and Naval Bases, Cádiz, Spain
- Braniff International Airways, Operations and Maintenance Base, Dallas, Texas

=== 1957 ===
- First National Bank, Denver, Colorado
- Motion Picture Country House and Hospital, Woodland Hills, California
- Nellis Air Force Base buildings, Nevada

=== 1958 ===
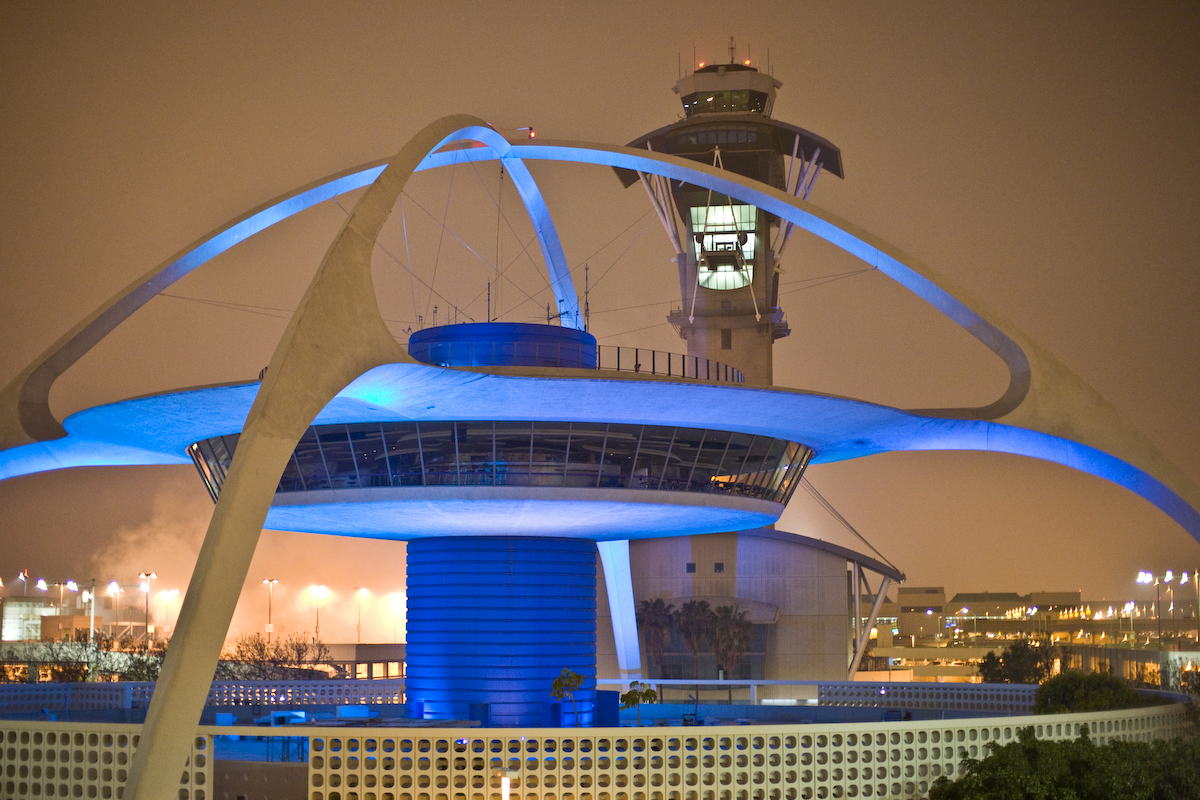
LAX Theme Building

- Beckman Corporation plant, Newport Beach, California
- Berlin Hilton, Berlin, Germany
- Bullock's Fashion Square, Santa Ana, California (partially demolished, now Westfield MainPlace)
- Chrysler Sales & Service Training Center, Anaheim, California
- Convair Astronautics, San Diego, California
- Disneyland Hotel
- Firestone Tire company headquarters, Los Angeles
- Ford Aeronutronics, Newport Beach, California (demolished)
- General Atomic, La Jolla, California
- Grossmont Hospital, San Diego, California
- IBM headquarters, Los Angeles
- Los Angeles International Airport
- Physical Plant Building B, University of Southern California
- Robinson's department store, Palm Springs, California
- Signal Oil headquarters, Los Angeles
- Union Oil Center, Los Angeles (now Los Angeles Center Studios)
- Valley Presbyterian Hospital, Van Nuys, California

=== 1961 ===
- Theme Building, Los Angeles International Airport, Los Angeles

== William L. Pereira & Associates ==
=== 1959 ===
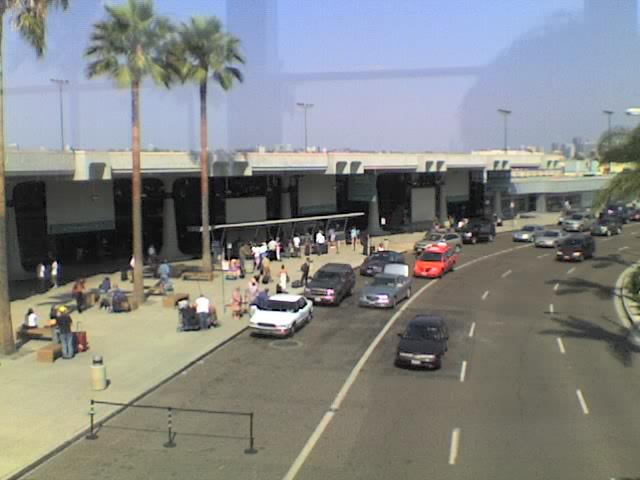
San Diego International Airport

- Automation Post Office, Washington, D.C.
- Carthay Circle Theatre, Hollywood
- Civic Center, Santa Fe Springs, California
- Firestone Aeronautical Research Laboratory, Caltech campus
- Fox Theatre, San Francisco
- Hoffman Science Center, Santa Barbara, California
- Hollywood Motion Picture and Television Museum (unbuilt)
- Lear Corporation, Goleta, California
- Linda Island homes, Newport Beach, California
- Los Angeles Zoo
- Prudential Savings and Loan building, Salt Lake City
- Rosenweig Commercial Center, Phoenix, Arizona
- San Diego International Airport
- Vogue Theatre, Hollywood

=== 1960 ===
- Biltmore Hotel, Santa Barbara, California
- Children's Theatre Arts Center, Los Angeles
- Communications School and Recreation Complex, Loyola University, Los Angeles
- Del E. Webb residence, Mission Bay, California
- Ford Aeronutronics, Newport Beach, California (demolished 1996)
- Fox Hills Home Savings and Loan, Fox Hills, California
- General Atomics headquarters, Sorrento Valley, California
- General Telephone Research Laboratories, Palo Alto, California
- Otis College of Art & Design, Los Angeles

=== 1961 ===
- Library, Santa Fe Springs, California
- Pereira Residence, Los Angeles
- Physical Sciences Building, University of Southern California
- Prudential Savings and Loan #2, Salt Lake City

=== 1962 ===
- Hunt Branch Library, Fullerton, California
- Prudential Savings and Loan, 49 N Main Street, Butte, Montana

=== 1963 ===
- Columbia Records pressing plant, Santa Maria, California
- Continental Savings and Loan, Montebello, California
- Gene Donovan residence, Salt Lake City
- Gibraltar Savings and Loan, San Marino, California
- Metropolitan Water District building, Victor Heights, Los Angeles
- Olin Hall of Engineering, University of Southern California
- Otis Chandler residence, San Marino, California
- Union Bank, Pasadena, California
- Ventura Bank and Office Building, 250 S. Mills Road, Ventura, California
- West Covina Country Club and Apartments, West Covina, California

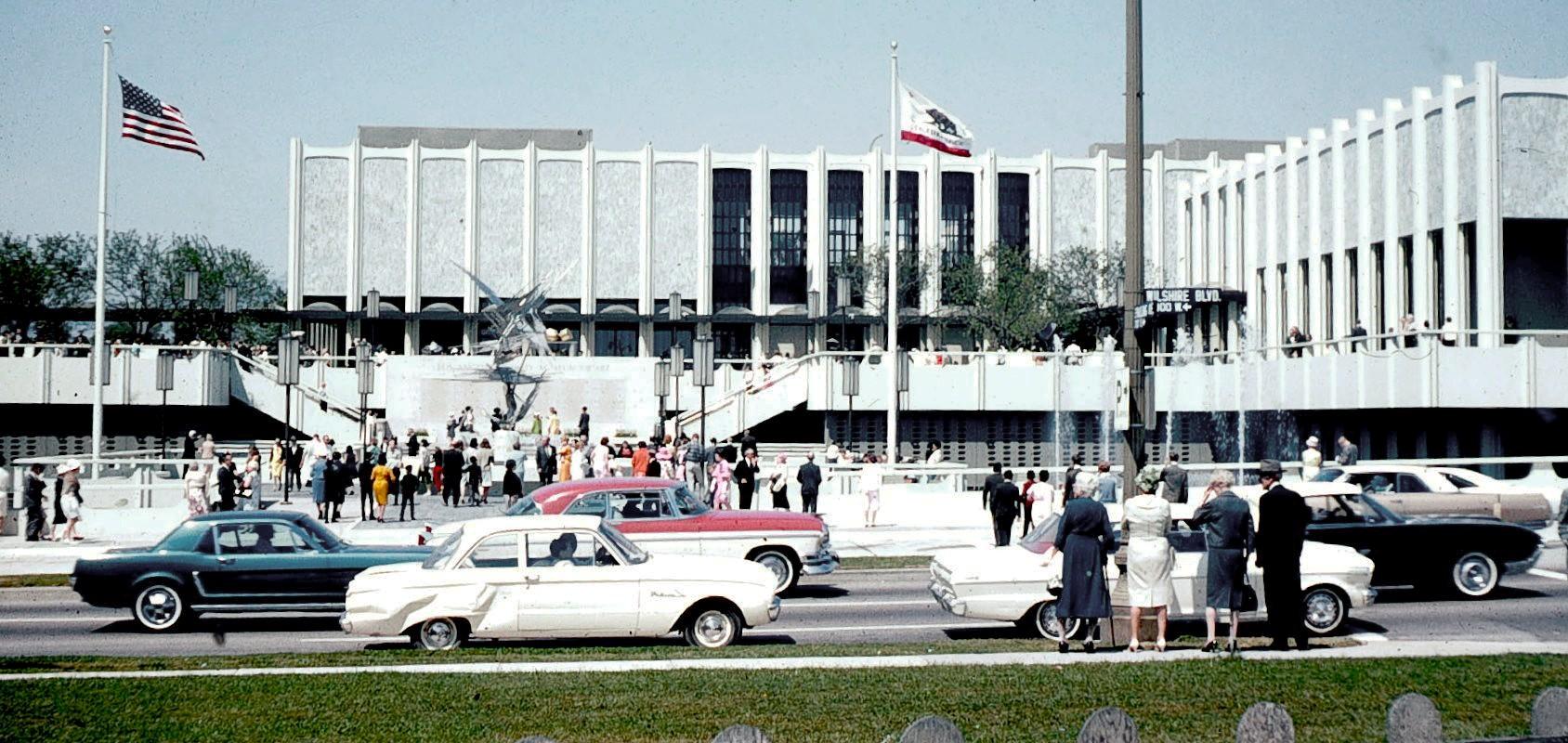
Los Angeles County Museum of Art

=== 1964 ===
- ABC Paramount Theatres headquarters, Los Angeles
- Ahmanson Center for Biological Research, University of Southern California
- Art Building, Occidental College, Los Angeles
- Arthur Coons Center, Occidental College, Los Angeles
- Beacon Street Apartments, Santa Catalina Island, California
- Clementine Avenue Townhouses, Santa Catalina Island, California
- David Bright residence
- Descanso Canyon Hotel, Santa Catalina Island, California
- Douglas Aircraft Research Laboratory, Huntington Beach, California (demolished 2021)
- Gibraltar Savings and Loan, Baldwin Hills, California
- Harris Fine Arts Center, Brigham Young University Provo, Utah
- International Motion Pictures studio, San Juan, Puerto Rico
- Laguna Playhouse, Laguna Beach, California
- Union Bank, Fullerton, California
- Prudential Federal Savings, Salt Lake City, Utah

=== 1965 ===
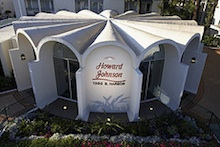
Howard Johnson Plaza Hotel at Disneyland. Anaheim, CA

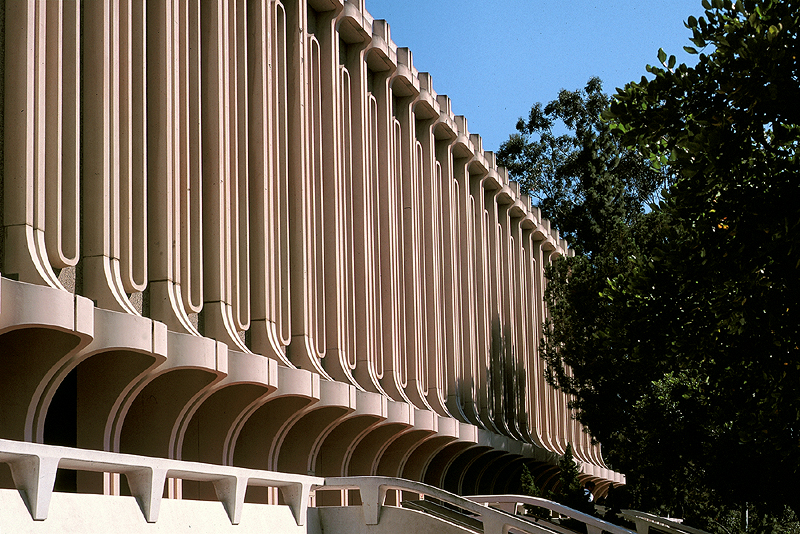
Jack Langson Library, University of California, Irvine

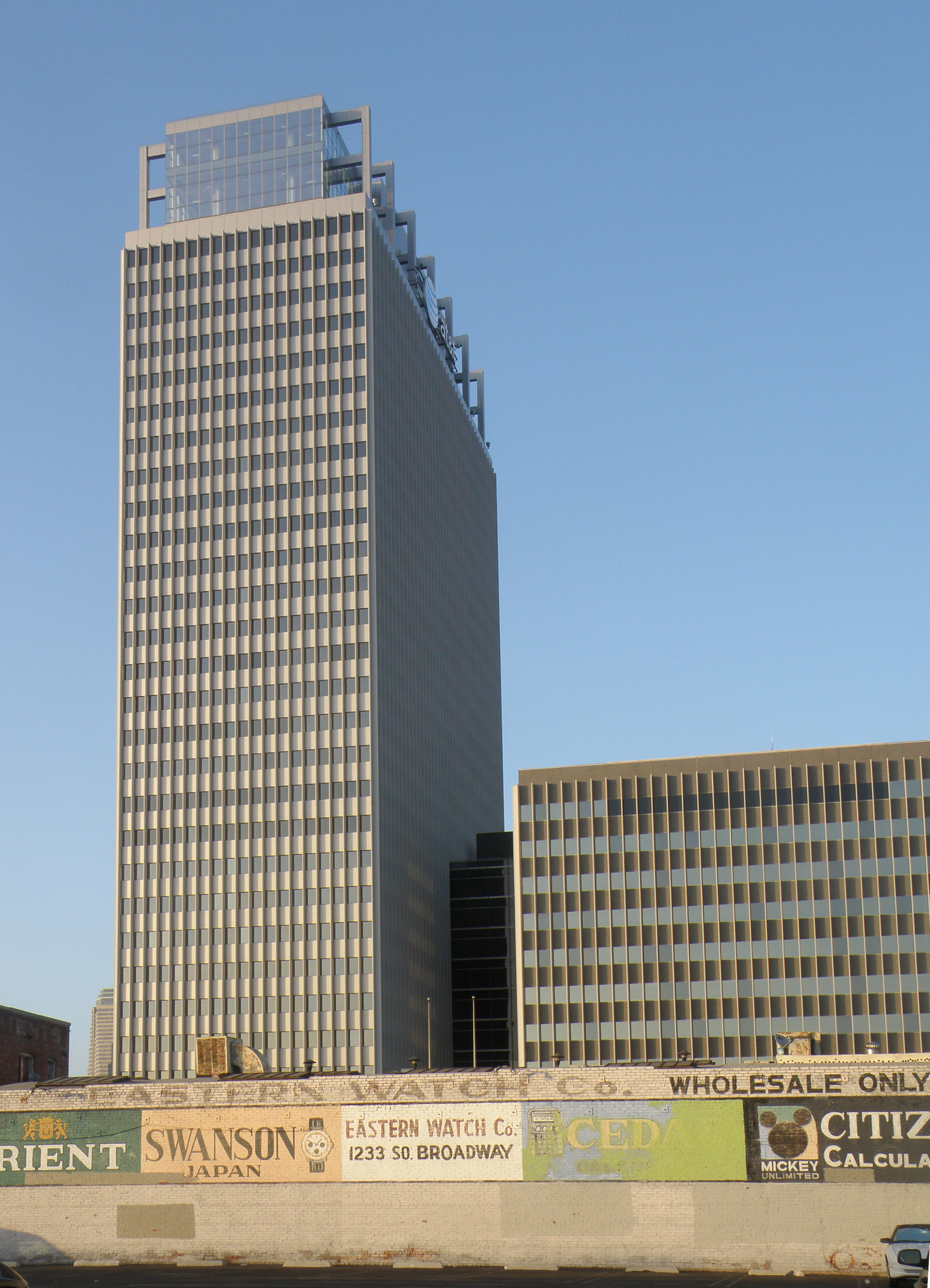
AT&T Center, Los Angeles

- AT&T Center, Los Angeles (previously headquarters for the Transamerica Corporation)
- Avalon Townhouses, Santa Catalina Island, California
- Bank of California, Orange, California
- Civic Center, San Dimas, California
- Communications Building, Los Angeles City College
- Community Building, Santa Fe Springs, California
- Cord Residence, Reno, Nevada
- Dickson Art Center, University of California, Los Angeles
- Ferris Rehearsal Hall, University of Southern California
- Gildread Theatre, Mexico City
- Golden West College, Huntington Beach, California
- Harris Fine Arts Center, Brigham Young University, Provo, Utah
- Howard Johnson Plaza Hotel, Anaheim, California
- Hotel Ivoire, Abidjan, Côte d'Ivoire
- International Clubs headquarters, Los Angeles
- Los Angeles County Museum of Art (demolished 2020)
- Pepsi plant, Santa Ana, California
- University of California, Irvine campus (infrastructure, campus layout, and early buildings)
  - Central Plant
  - Crawford Hall
  - Gateway Study Center
  - Humanities Hall
  - Murray Krieger Hall
  - Jack Langson Library
  - Mesa Court (phase 1)
  - Howard A. Schneiderman Lecture Hall
  - Edward A. Steinhaus Hall
- Unocal 76 gas station, Beverly Hills, California (designed by Gin Wong)

=== 1966 ===
- John Stauffer Hall of Science, University of Southern California
- North American Aviation, Santa Catalina Island, California
- Robertson Plaza, Beverly Hills, California
- Seaquarium, Atlantic City, New Jersey
- Wilshire County Country Club, Los Angeles

=== 1967 ===
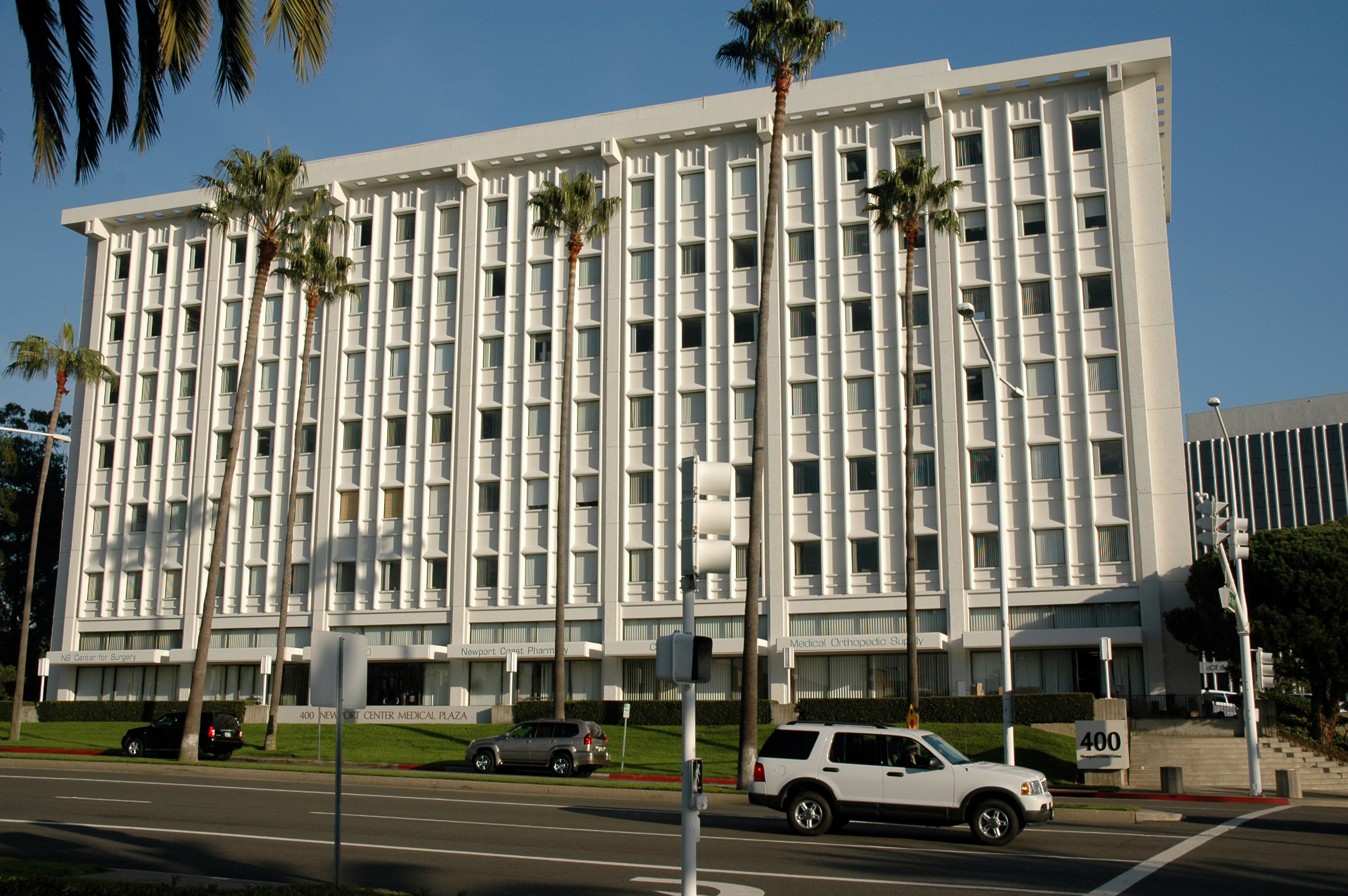
400 Tower, Newport Beach

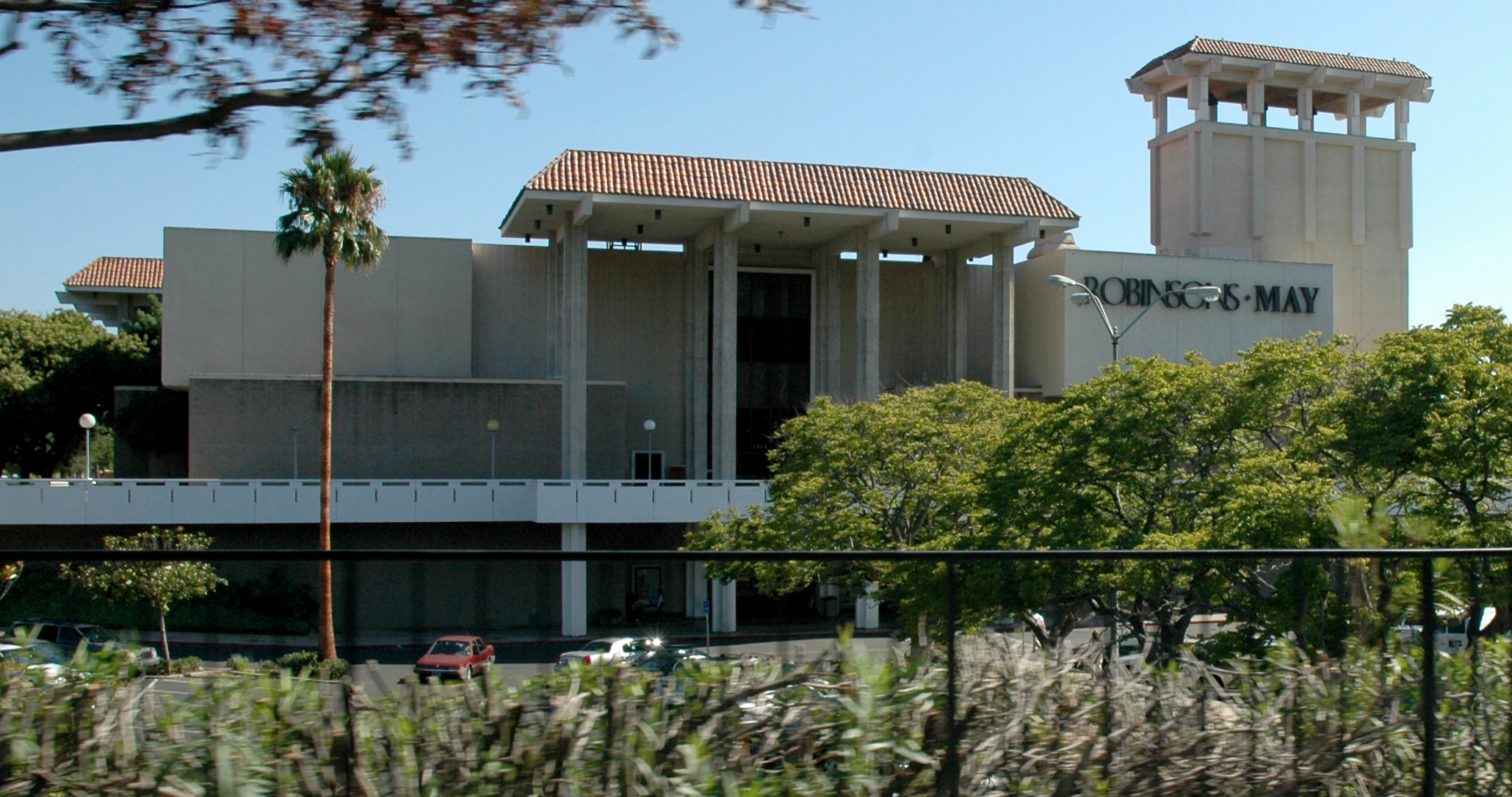
Robinson's La Cumbre Plaza, Santa Barbara

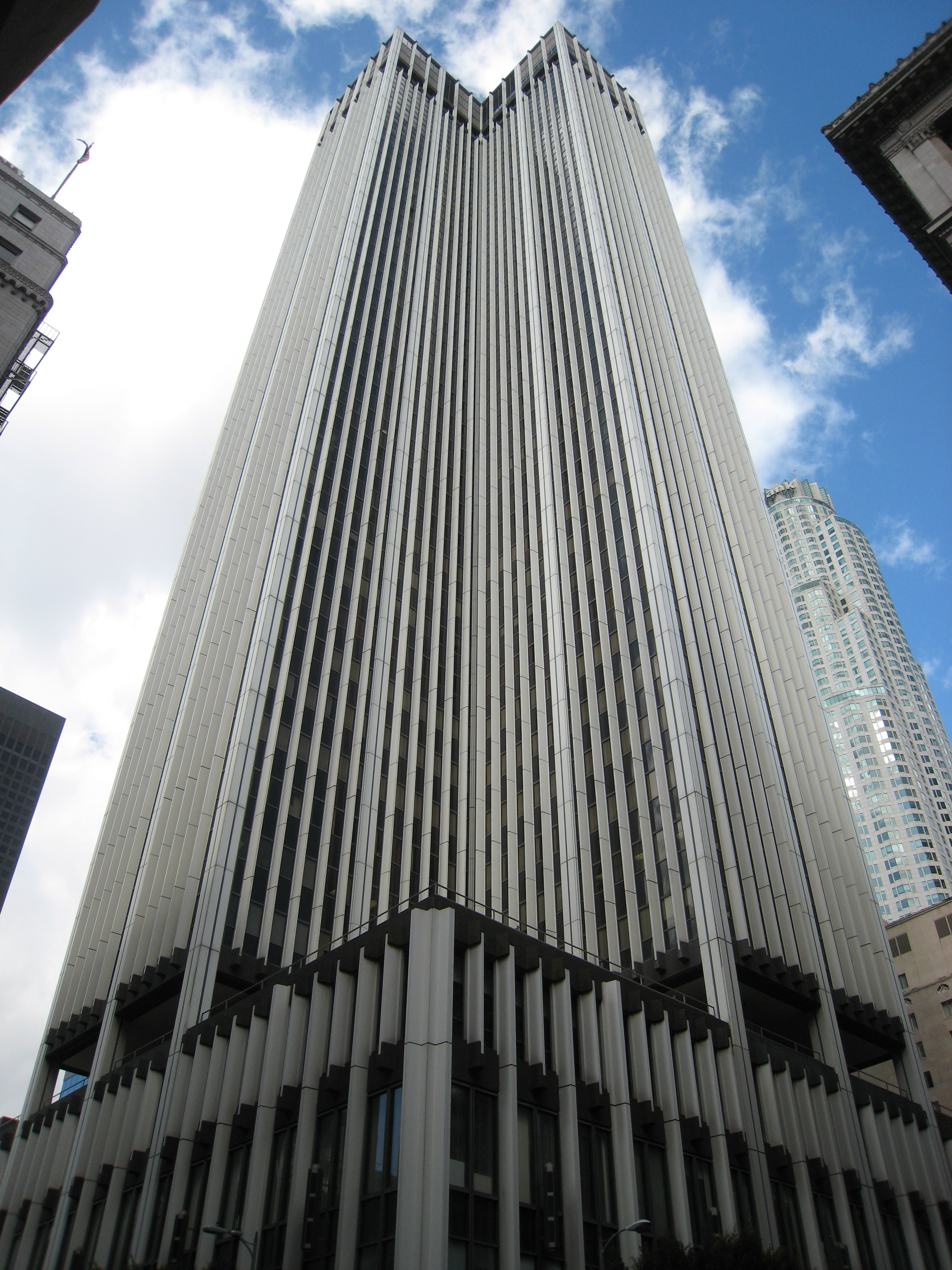
611 Place, Los Angeles

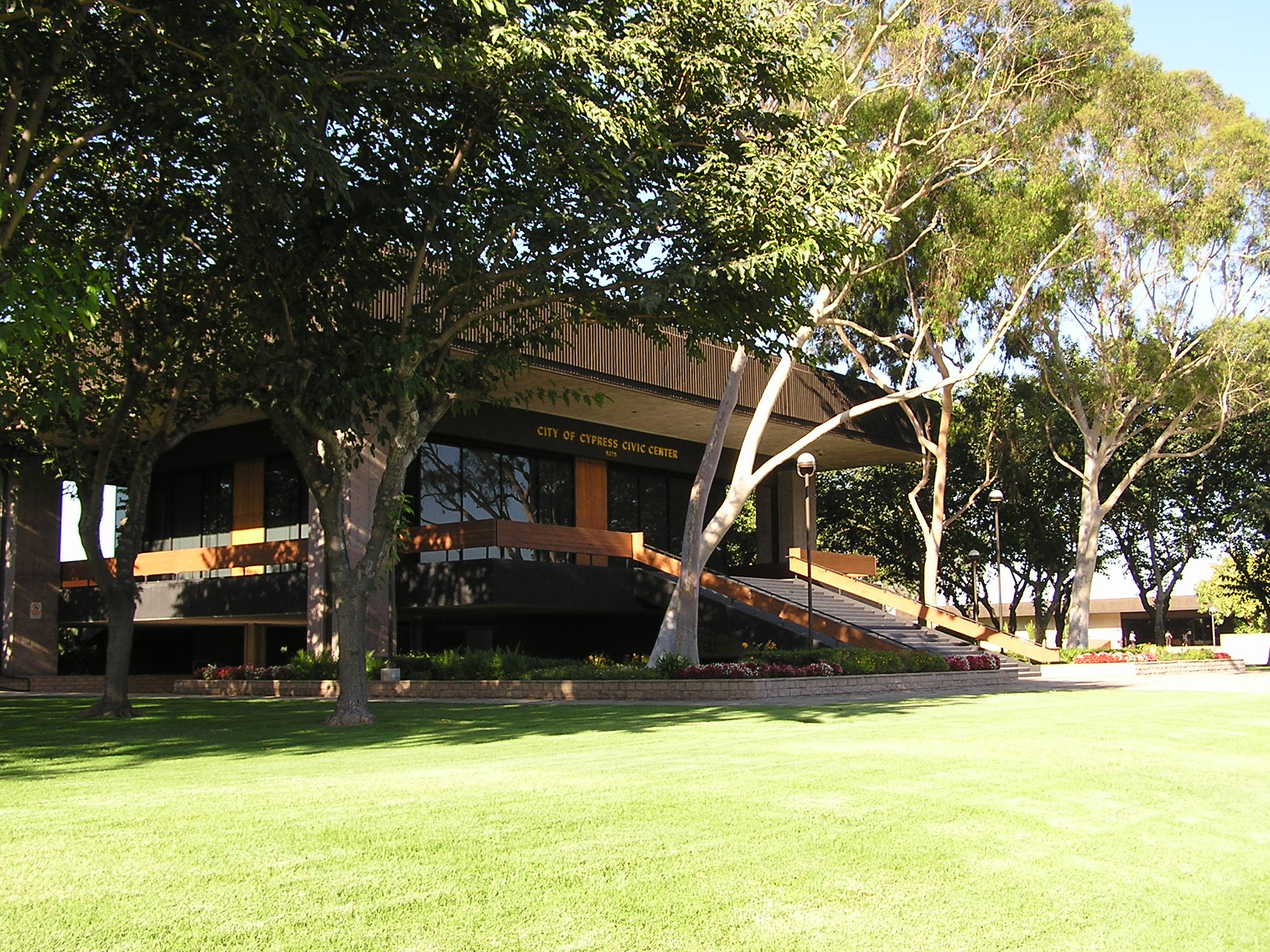
Cypress City Council Chamber, Cypress, California

- 400 Tower, Newport Center, Newport Beach, California
- 611 Place, Los Angeles
- City Hall, Miami, Florida
- Civic Center, Newport Beach, California
- Council Chamber and City Hall, Cypress, California
- Eddie Martin Terminal, John Wayne Airport, Santa Ana, California (demolished 1994)
- Fine Arts Building, University of Vermont
- Fort St. Vrain Nuclear Power Plant, Denver, Colorado
- Fremont Junior College
- Hall of Science, University of Southern California
- Hoffman Electronics headquarters, Santa Barbara, California
- Hollywood Communications Center, Hollywood
- Horticulture Building and Greenhouse, University of California, Irvine
- Litton Industries headquarters, Santa Catalina Island, California
- Rio de Janeiro International Airport, Brazil

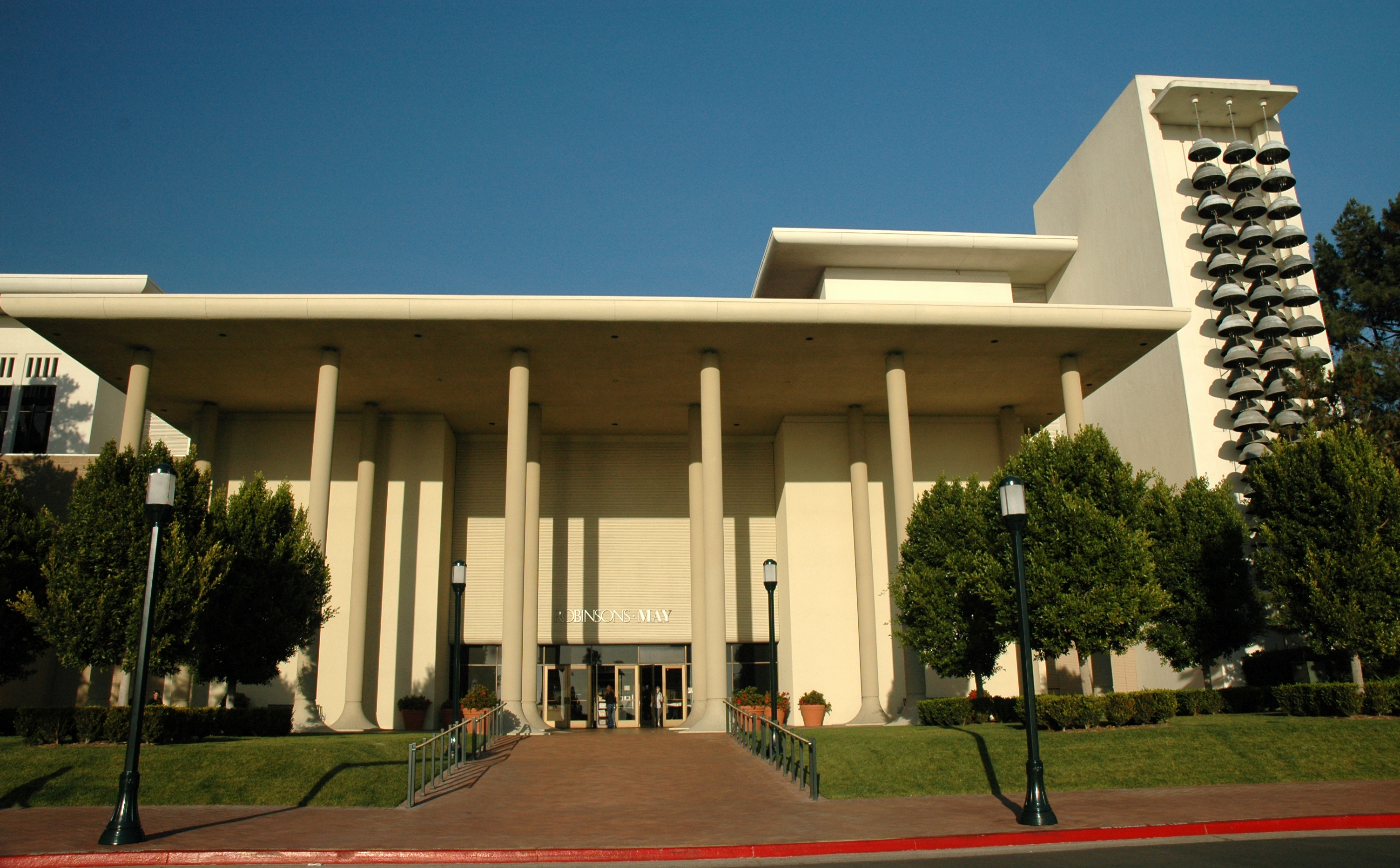
Former Robinson's department store, Newport Beach, Cal., built 1967

- Robinson's, Fashion Island, Newport Beach, California
- Robinson's, La Cumbre Plaza, Santa Barbara, California
- Tunis Airport, Tunisia
- United States Navy Defense Office Complex, Washington, D.C.
- USC Marine Science Center, Santa Catalina Island, California
- Vivian Hall, University of Southern California
- William Pereira's own house, Los Angeles
- World Airways Terminal, Los Angeles International Airport

=== 1968 ===
- American Red Cross Chapel, Los Angeles
- Anderson Hills Shopping Center, Williams, California
- Bethany Heights Condominiums
- Don Muang Airport, Thailand
- Geneva Presbyterian Church, Laguna Hills, California
- Kona Bishop Hotel, Kona, Hawaii
- Law Building, University of Southern California
- Lockheed Power Plant, Palmdale, California
- Occidental Life Insurance Company headquarters, Los Angeles
- Rye Canyon Science Laboratory, Palmdale, California
- Santa Ana Cinema, Santa Ana, California
- New England Center, University of New Hampshire

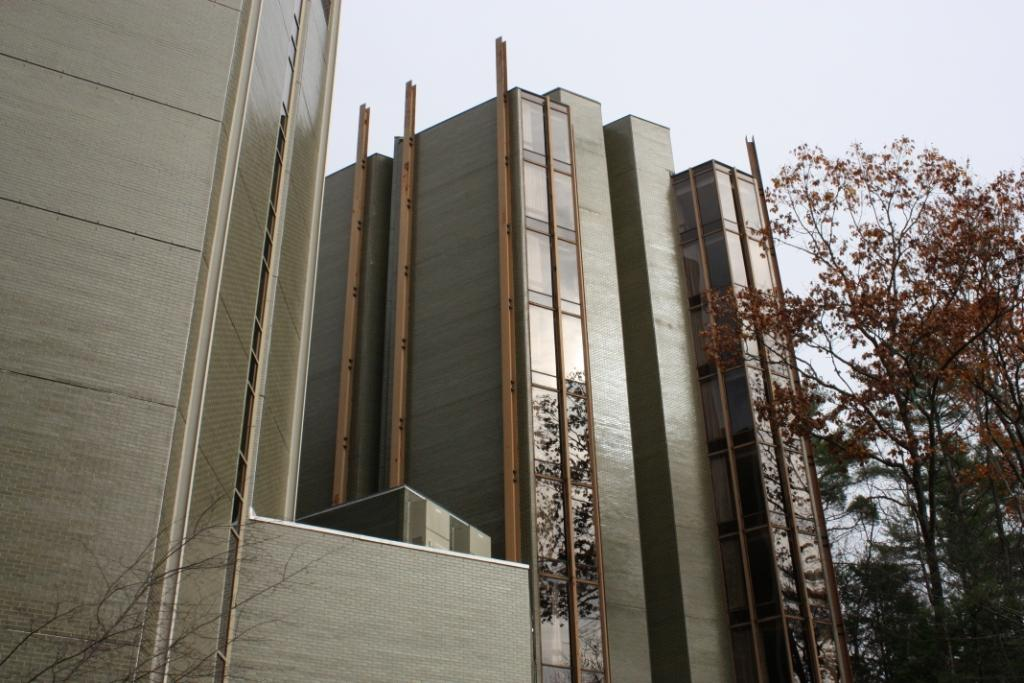
New England Center, University of New Hampshire, Durham, NH

=== 1969 ===
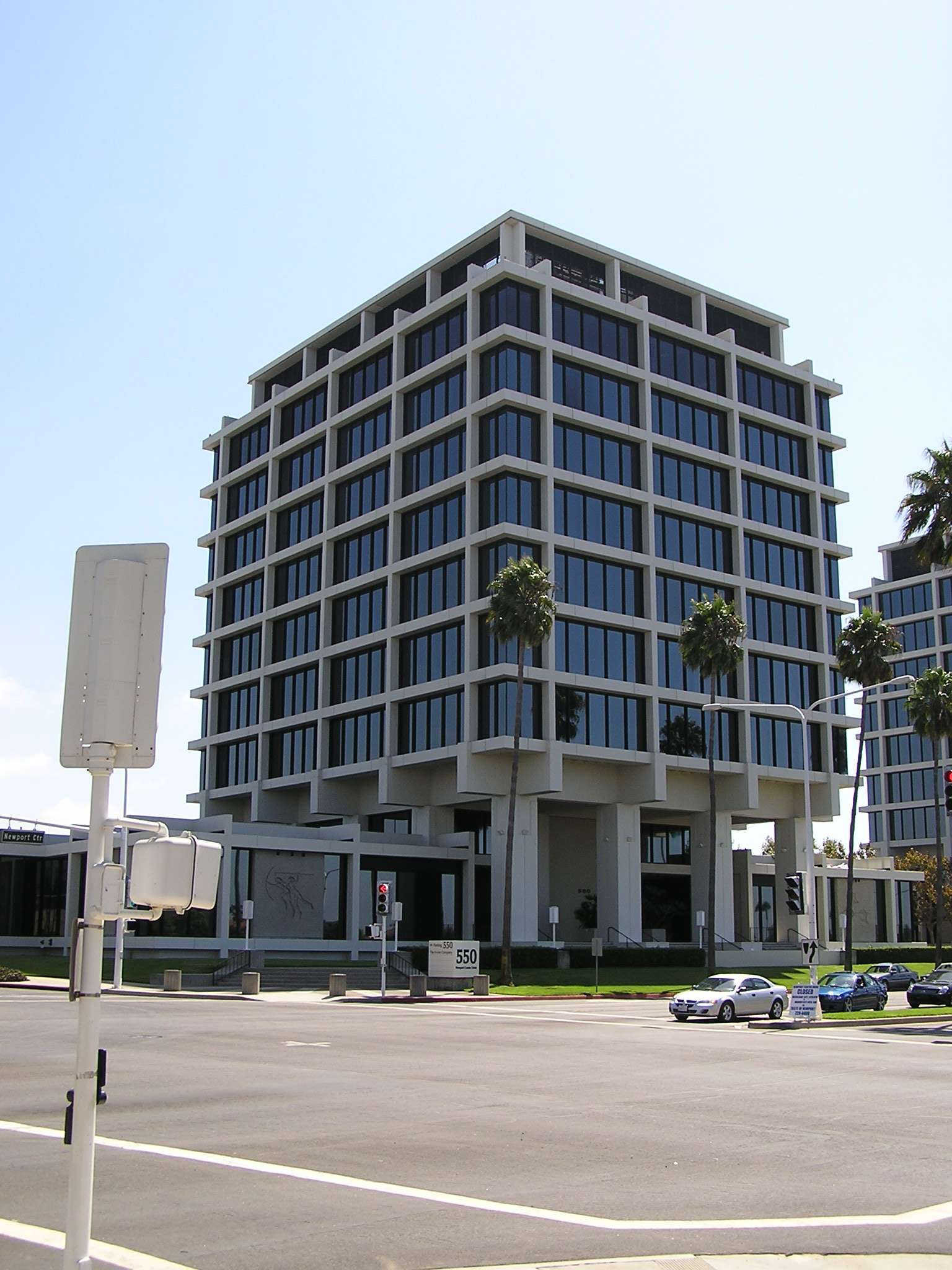
500/550 Towers, Newport Beach

- 500/550 Twin Towers, Newport Center, Newport Beach, California
- Amfac Center, Ontario, Canada
- Buena Park Library, Buena Park, California
- Bunker Hill Towers, Los Angeles
- Camp Pendleton Hospital, Camp Pendleton, California
- Great Western Savings and Loan, Los Angeles
- H.S. Pogue Department Store, Cincinnati, Ohio
- JC Penney, San Diego
- Robinson's Department Store, Fashion Valley Mall, San Diego, California
- Mutual Benefit Life Building, Cincinnati, Ohio
- Pan Am Terminal, Honolulu International Airport
- San Nicolas Place, Newport Center, Newport Beach, California
- Seaver Science Center, University of Southern California

=== 1970 ===
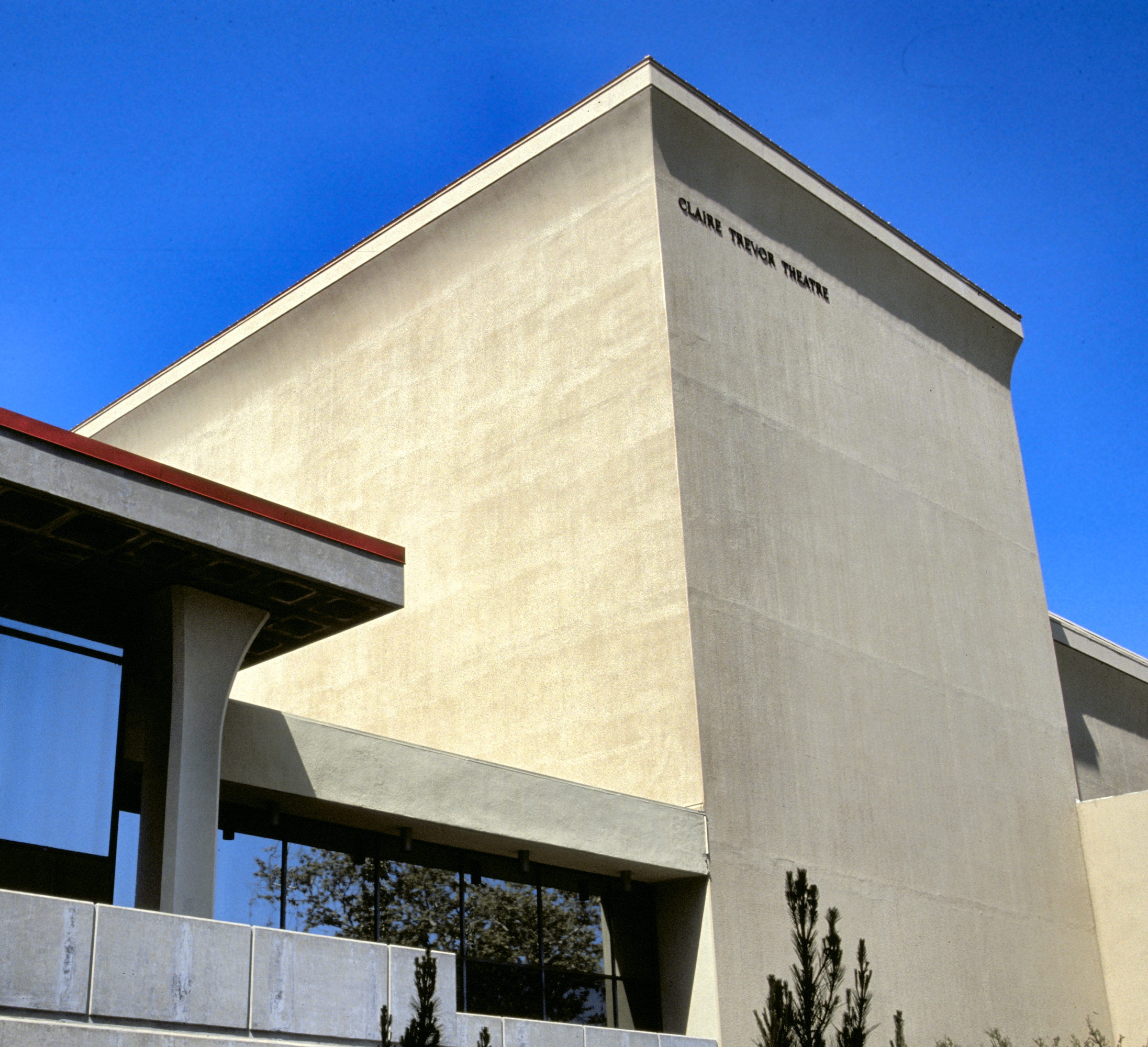
Claire Trevor Theatre, part of the Claire Trevor School of the Arts at the University of California, Irvine

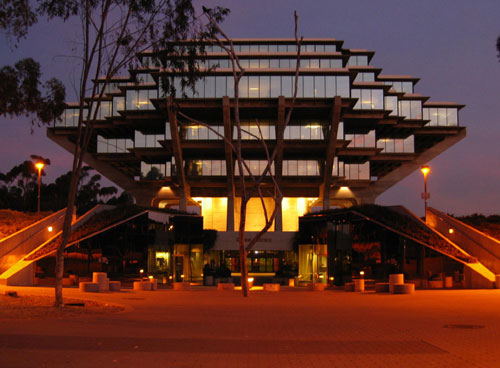
Geisel Library, San Diego

- Civic Center and Auditorium, Inglewood, California
- Fine Arts Complex, University of California, Irvine (now the Claire Trevor School of the Arts)
  - Art Studios
  - Music Building
  - Art Gallery (now the Beall Center for Art and Technology)
  - Drama Building
  - Sculpture and Ceramic Studios (now the Nixon Theatre)
  - Orchestra Rehearsal Hall
  - Production Studio
  - Concert Hall (now Winifred Smith Hall)
  - Studio Theatre
  - Village Theatre (now the Claire Trevor Theatre)
- Geisel Library, University of California, San Diego
- Hollywood Park Hotel and Office Complex, Hollywood
- J.C. Penney, Sacramento, California
- J.C. Penney, Honolulu, Hawaii
- J.C. Penney, San Bernardino, California
- New England Center, University of New Hampshire, Durham
- Scripps Clinic, San Diego
- Studio Theatre, Kennedy Center, Washington, D.C.
- St. Vincent's Hospital, Santa Fe, New Mexico
- Texas Industrial Laundries, Corpus Christi

=== 1971 ===
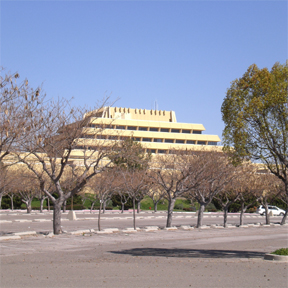
Chet Holifield Federal Building

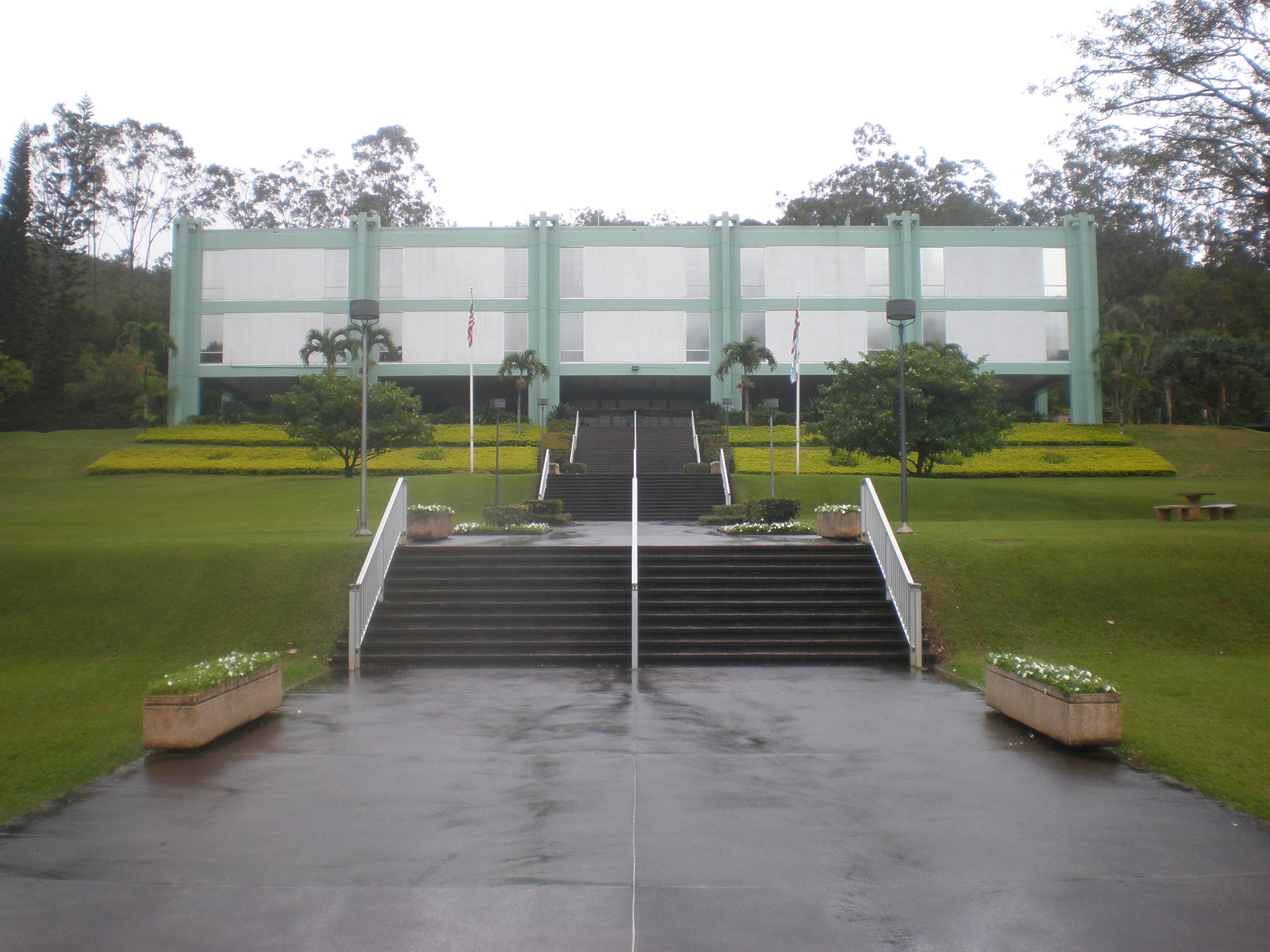
Hawaii Loa College

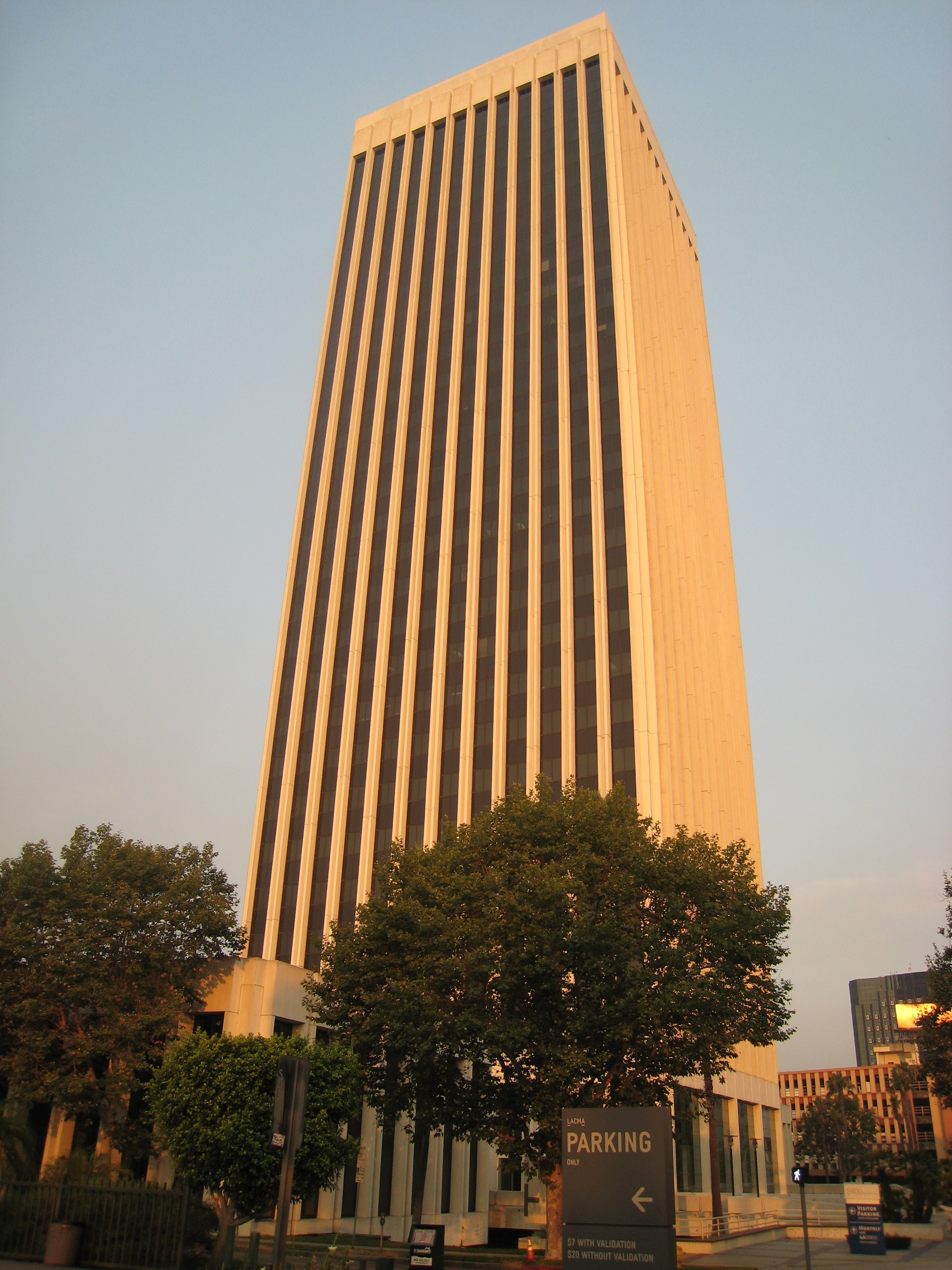
5900 Wilshire, Los Angeles

- 5900 Wilshire Tower, Los Angeles (designed by Gin Wong)
- Bank of America, Whittier, California
- Eastern Airlines Terminal, Atlanta International Airport
- Harbor Justice Center, Irvine, California
- Hawaii Loa College, Oahu, Hawaii
- Library, University of Cincinnati
- Newport Medical Towers, Newport Center, Newport Beach, California
- Rockwell Autonetics, Laguna Niguel, California (now Chet Holifield Federal Building)
- Social Security Administration Center, San Francisco
- Two Houston Center, Houston, Texas

=== 1972 ===
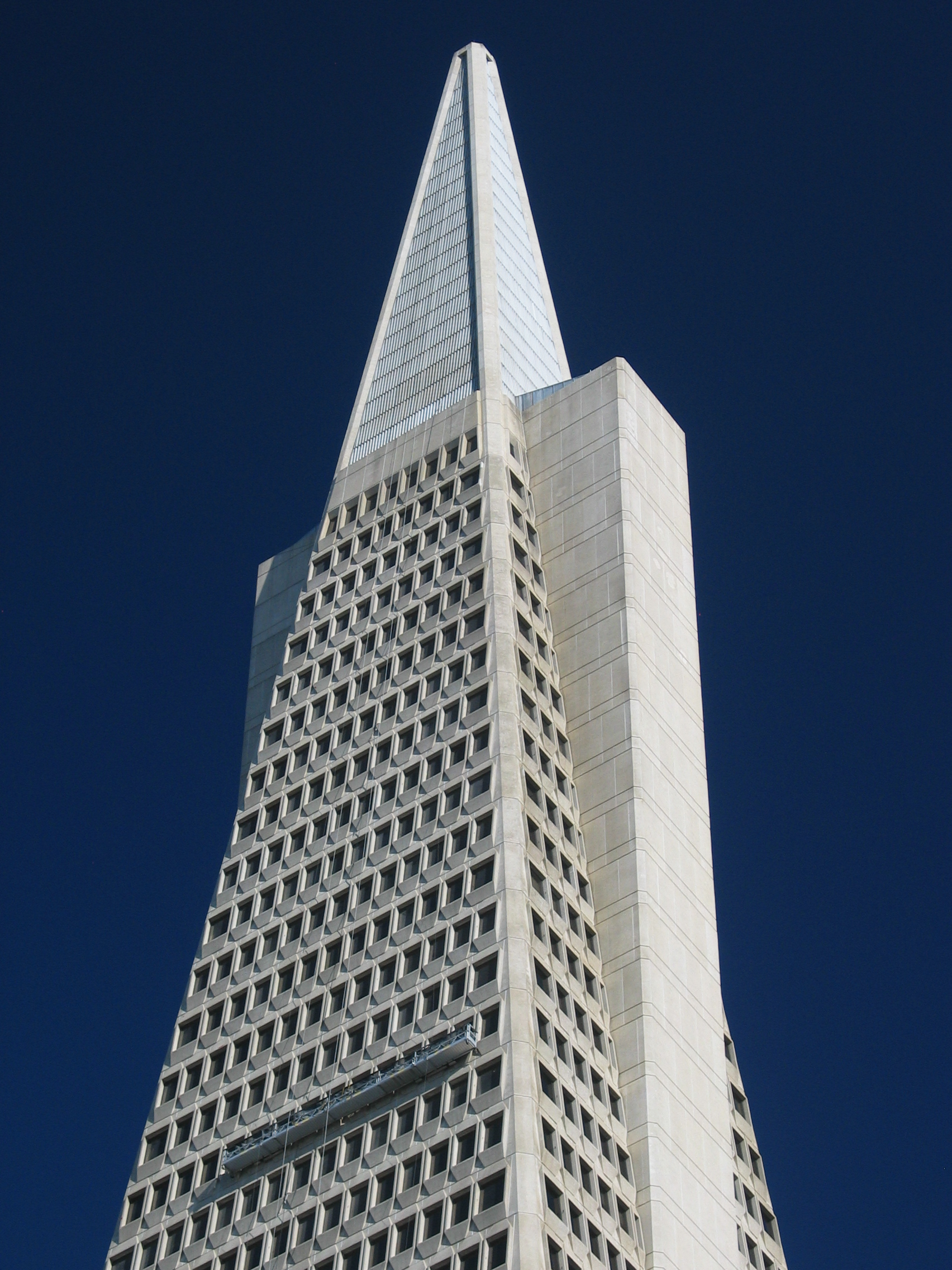
Transamerica Pyramid, San Francisco

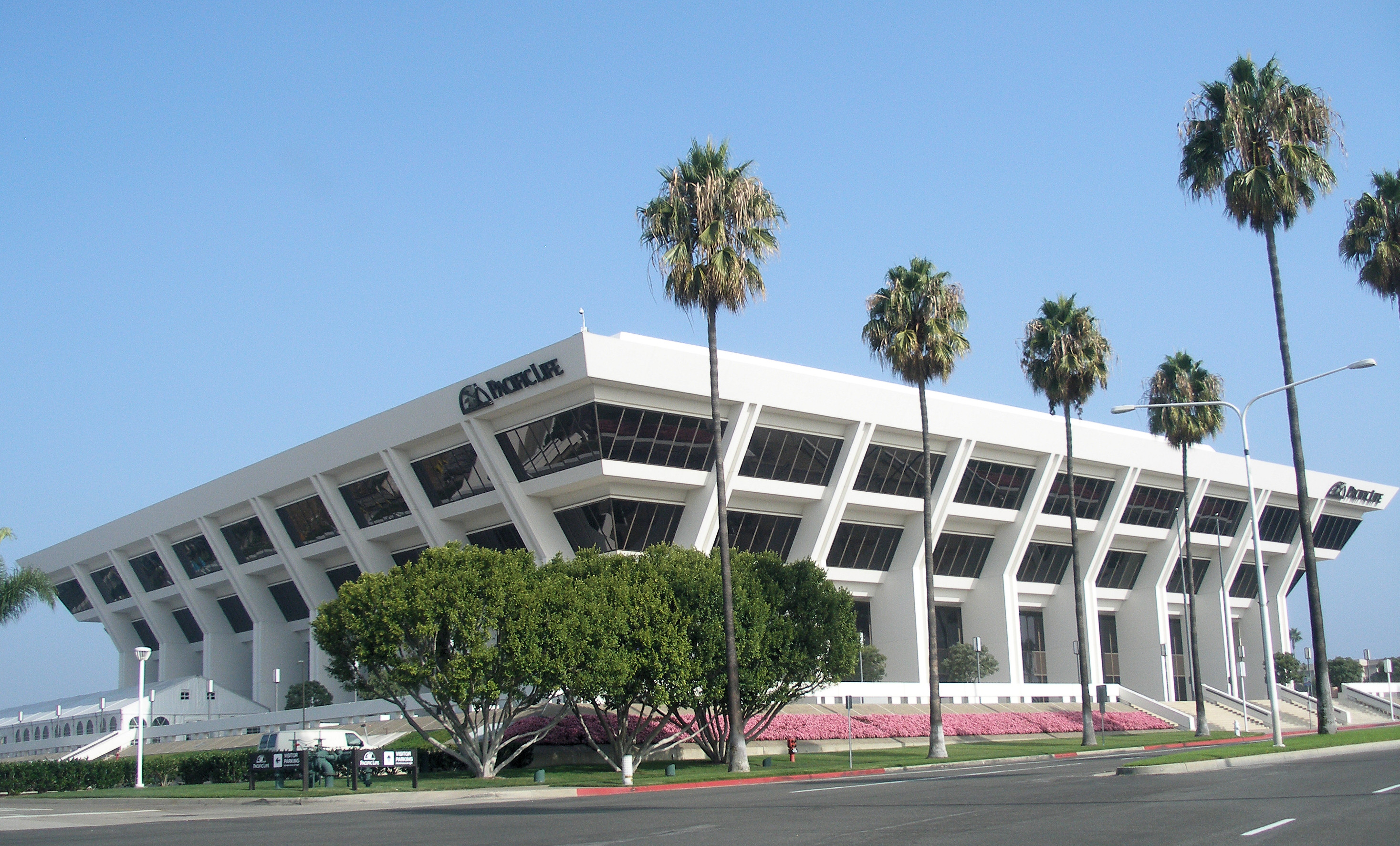
Pacific Life Building, Newport Beach

- Bob Hope residence, Burbank, California (unrealized?)
- The Broadway, Santa Anita, California
- The Broadway, Fox Hills, California
- Citibank, Albany, New York
- Citibank, Rochester, New York
- Citibank, Smith Grove, New York
- Citibank, Syracuse, New York
- Civic Center, Aurora, Illinois
- Conference Center and Housing Complex, Lagos, Nigeria
- Convention Center, Columbus, Ohio
- Desert Hospital, Palm Springs, California
- Eastmont Mall, Oakland, California
- Grand Slam Health Club, Costa Mesa, California
- Great Western Financial Corporation, 8484 Wilshire, Beverly Hills (now called the Flynt Building)
- Gulf Mall, Panama City, Florida
- Hillcrest Hospital, Petaluma, California
- Honolulu Medical Complex, Honolulu, Hawaii
- Hospital, University of Southern California
- Leleiwe Beach Hotel, Hilo, Hawaii
- Marriott Hotel, Bermuda
- Mauna Loa Shores Apartments, Hawaii
- Pacific Life building, Newport Center, Newport Beach, California
- Reno International Airport, Reno, Nevada
- San Francisco International Airport
- Sears Shopping Center, La Puerte, California
- Shuttle Terminal, La Guardia Airport, New York City
- Tehran International Airport, Tehran, Iran
- Transamerica Pyramid, San Francisco
- United California Bank, San Mateo, California
- Vacia Talega Hotel and Condominiums, Puerto Rico
- Westin St. Francis Hotel, San Francisco

=== 1973 ===
- Beverly Hills Medical Building, Beverly Hills
- Charles Lee Powell Hall, University of Southern California
- Bayou Building, University of Houston at Clear Lake City
- Communications Building, Los Angeles City College
- Continental Airlines First Class Lounge, Los Angeles International Airport
- Eisenhower Center, Washington, D.C.
- First Hawaiian Bank Building, Honolulu
- Greyhound Bus Terminal, Reno, Nevada
- Harrisburg International Airport, Harrisburg, Pennsylvania
- Hartsfield Airport, Atlanta, Georgia
- Hawaii Kai Studio, Honolulu
- Makaha Towers and Country Club, Makaha, Hawaii
- Metropolitan Water District building (The Elysian), Victor Heights, Los Angeles
- Naval Base, New Orleans, Louisiana
- Pacific Financial Center, Los Angeles
- Phillips Theme Tower, Pepperdine University
- Regent Beach Hotel, Pattaya, Thailand
- Riverside Administration Building, Riverside, California
- Security Pacific National Bank, Oakland, California
- Wilshire Regent Hotel, Los Angeles
- Wells Fargo Bank, Newport Center, Newport Beach, California

=== 1974 ===
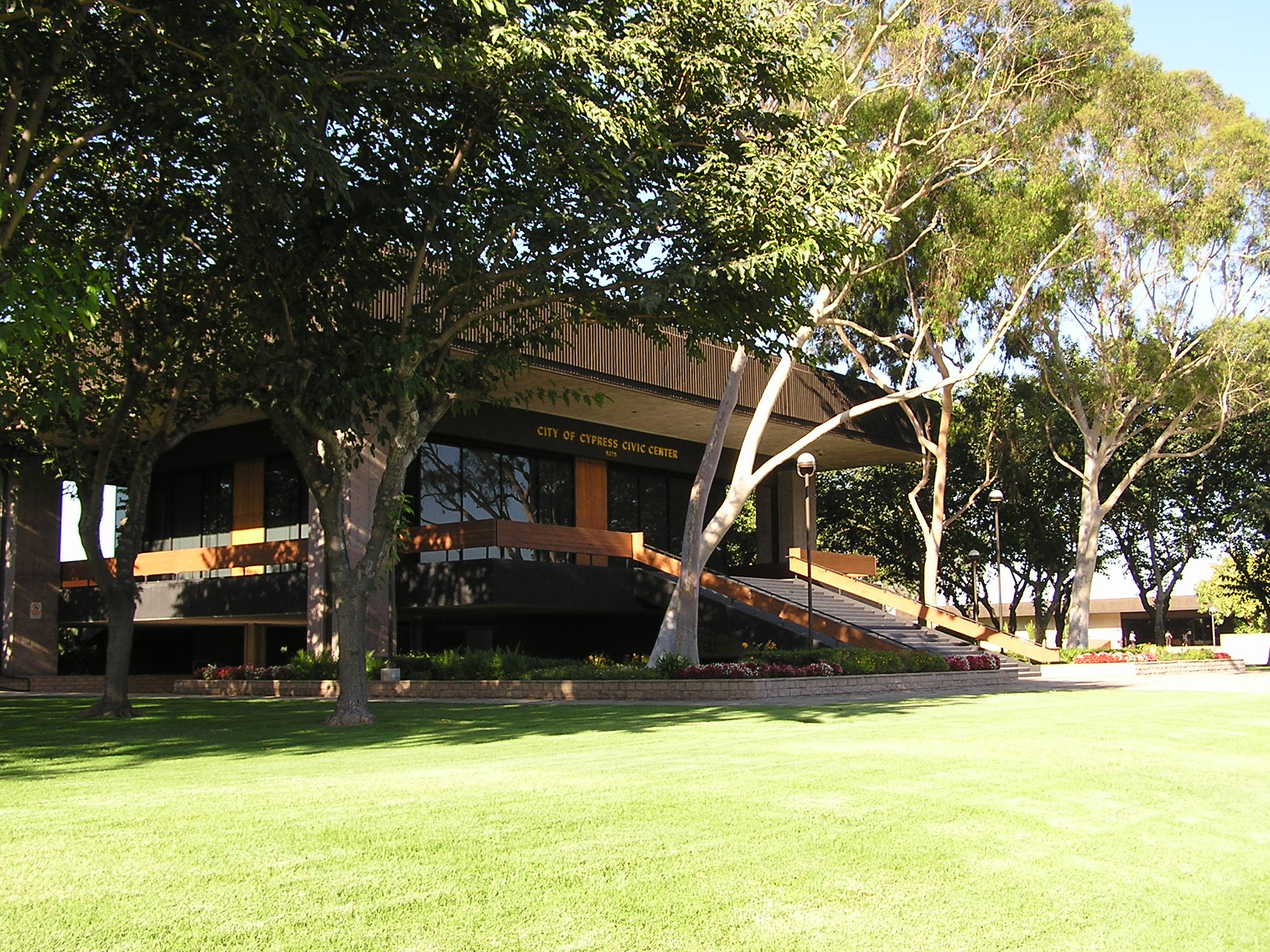
Cypress City Hall Annex

- 450 Tower, Newport Center, Newport Beach, California
- 660 Tower, Newport Center, Newport Beach, California
- California State Capitol Building Addition, Sacramento, California
- Central Post Office, La Habra, California
- City Hall Annex, Cypress, California
- Continental Hotel, Guam
- Convention Center, Palm Springs, California
- Crocker Citizen's Bank, San Francisco
- Hilton Hotel, Kuta, Bali
- Hoag Hospital West Tower, Newport Beach, California
- Imperial Medical Center, Tehran, Iran (now called Iran University of Medical Sciences)
- Kauai Inn and Conference Center, Hawaii
- Library, Cypress, California
- Medical and Dental Clinic, San Diego Naval Training Center
- Middle Earth Housing, University of California, Irvine (phase 1)
- Naval Hospital, Port Hueneme, California
- Naval Hospital, San Diego, California
- Pacific Mutual Building, San Francisco
- Quail Springs Mall, Oklahoma City, Oklahoma
- Staten Island Hospital, New York City
- Virginia Ramo Hall of Music, University of Southern California

=== 1975 ===
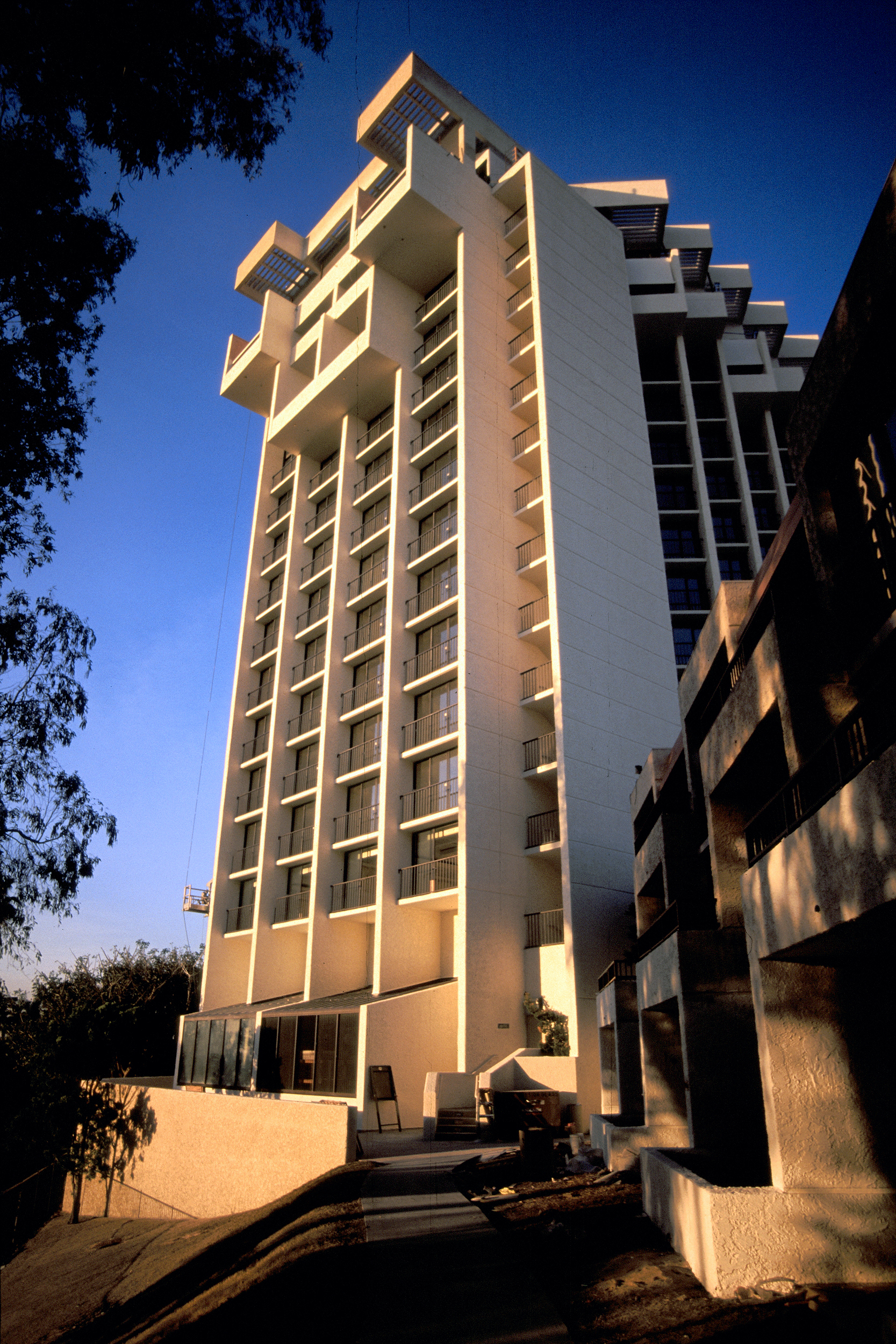
Newport Beach Marriott

- Albert S. Raubenheimer Music Building, University of Southern California
- Frank Hagel Social Security Building, Richmond, California
- Marriott Hotel, Newport Center, Newport Beach, California
- Satellite Building 2, Los Angeles International Airport

=== 1976 ===
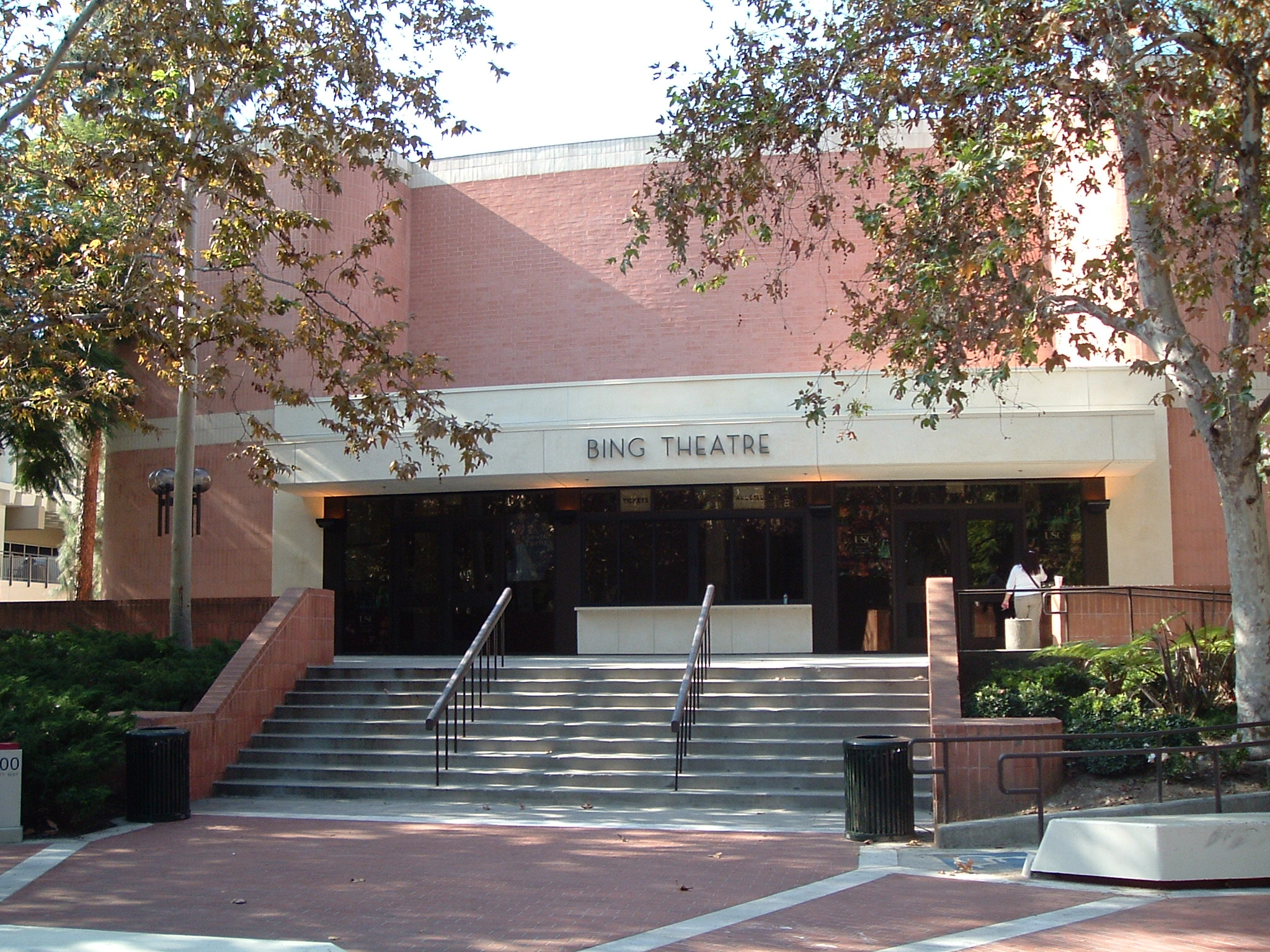
Bing Theatre, University of Southern California

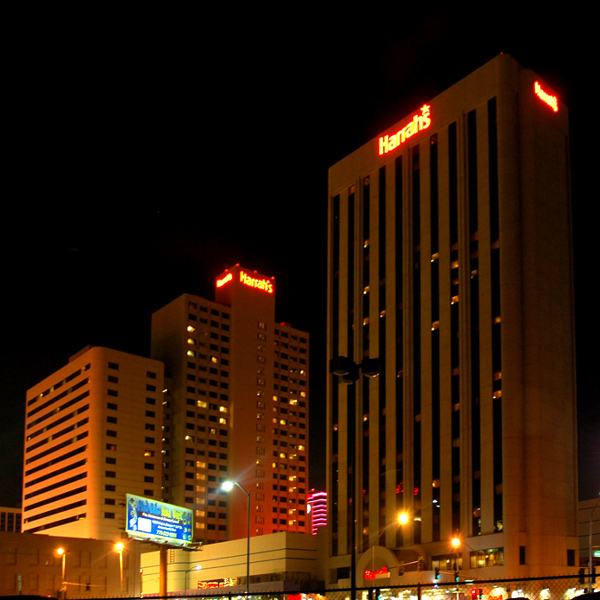
Harrah's, Reno, Nevada

- Barstow Community College, Barstow, California
- Bell Operations Training Facility, Tehran, Iran
- Bing Theatre, University of Southern California
- Biology Building, Caltech campus
- Computer Science Center, University of Southern California
- Harrah's, Reno, Nevada
- Jet Propulsion Laboratory, Pasadena, California
- Los Angeles Trade Tech Library, Los Angeles
- Professional Office Building, Glendale, California
- Stanford Research Institute, Menlo Park, California

=== 1977 ===
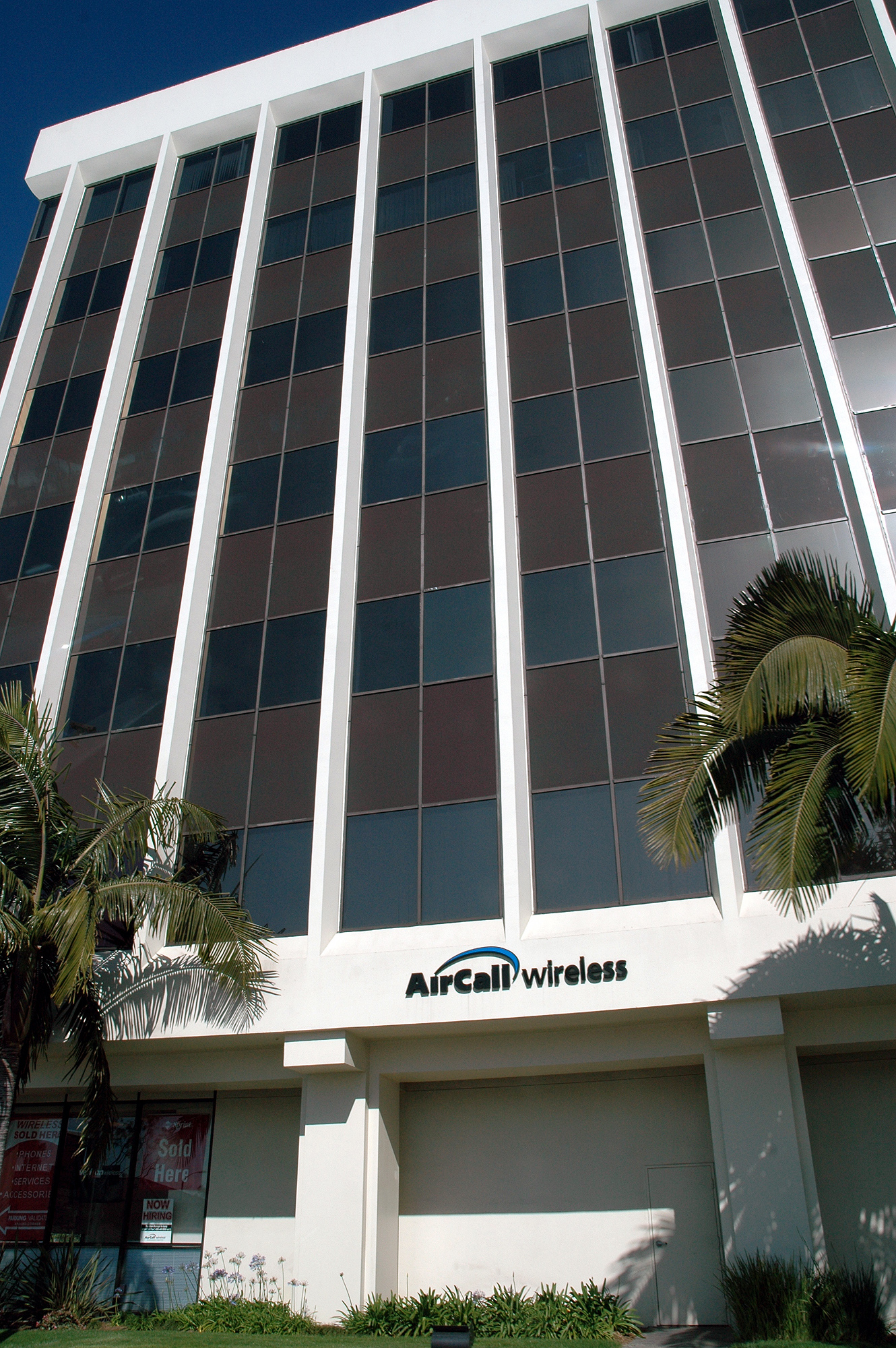
California Bank Building, Costa Mesa

- Arizona State Prison, Florence, Arizona
- Armed Services Headquarters, Jakarta, Indonesia
- Boise Industrial Park, Boise, Idaho
- Braille Institute, Los Angeles, California
- Cerritos Cultural Center, Cerritos, California
- Convention Center, San Francisco
- County Government Center, San Bernardino, California
- Douglas Aircraft Plaza, Irvine, California
- Federal Correctional Facility, Camarillo, California
- Gaylord Apartments, Las Vegas, Nevada
- Horrock's, Baton Rouge, Louisiana
- Hyatt Hotel, Kuwait
- Intevep Laboratories, Caracas, Venezuela
- Lake Tahoe Community College, Lake Tahoe, California
- Maricopa Jail, Maricopa, California
- National Steinbeck Center, Salinas, California
- Produce Market, Los Angeles
- Prudential Office Building, Costa Mesa, California (now California Bank & Trust)
- South Coast Town Center, Costa Mesa, California (heavily altered)
- Toyota Headquarters, Torrance, California (demolished)
- Warner Bros. Office Building, Burbank, California

=== 1978 ===
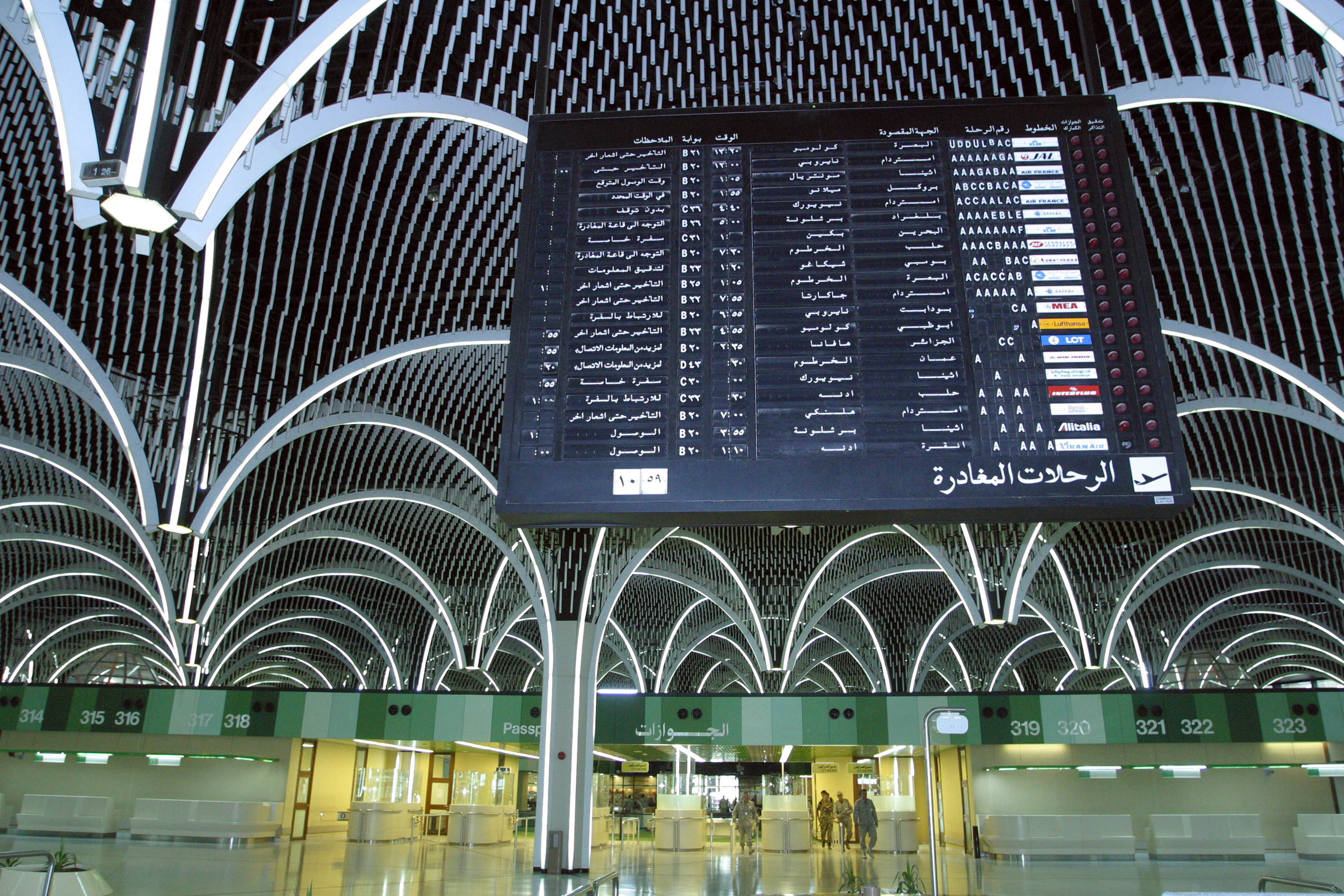
Baghdad International Airport

- American Airlines Corporate Headquarters, Los Angeles International Airport
- Baghdad International Airport (formerly Saddam International Airport), Baghdad, Iraq
- Host International Headquarters, Los Angeles
- Los Angeles Times, Northridge, California
- Los Angeles Times, Costa Mesa, California
- Raley's Landing, Sacramento, California

=== 1979 ===
- Hydrocarbon Institute, University of Southern California

=== 1980 ===
- Communicore, EPCOT Center, Walt Disney World Resort, Lake Buena Vista, Florida
- Pontiac Office Tower, Singapore
- Two Transamerica Center, San Francisco
- Yanbu Residential Community, Yanbu, Saudi Arabia
- Los Angeles City College Communications Center [Los Angeles]

=== 1981 ===
- Jonathan Club, Los Angeles
- Universal City Sheraton Hotel, Burbank, California

=== 1982 ===
- Doha Sheraton Hotel, Doha, Qatar
- Nob Hill Condominiums, San Francisco
- Park La Brea, Los Angeles
- Performing Arts Center, Whittier, California

=== 1983 ===
- Lockheed headquarters, Calabasas, California
- Park Wellington Condominiums, Los Angeles
- T-2 Information Systems, Carlsbad, California
- Irvine Hall, University of California, Irvine

=== 1984 ===
- One Sansome Street, San Francisco

=== 1985 ===
- Fox Plaza, Century City, Los Angeles (with Scott Johnson and Bill Fain)
