= Gibraltar Savings and Loan =

Defunct American bank

Gibraltar Savings and Loan Association was an American bank operating in California, Washington, and Florida. It was organized as a savings and loan and failed in 1989.

== Overview ==
Its headquarters building at 9111 Wilshire Boulevard in Beverly Hills, was built in 1958, designed by William Pereira.

U.S. federal regulators seized assets of the bank in 1989. Its assets included $13.4 billion and the Los Angeles Equestrian Center, later transferred to Del Ray, a Burbank-based development firm. At the time, it was one of the largest insolvencies in U.S. history. It was later acquired by Security Pacific National Bank, then the fifth largest bank in the United States.
