= Newport Center, Newport Beach, California =

Coordinates: 33.616°N 117.8761°W

Newport Center
- Business district of Newport Beach
- Newport Center Drive
- Interactive map of Newport Center
- Country: United States
- State: California
- County: Orange
- City: Newport Beach
- Time zone: UTC-8 (PST)
  - Summer (DST): UTC-7 (PDT)

Newport Center is a business, shopping, and entertainment district located on a high bluff overlooking Newport Harbor in Newport Beach, California, centered around the Fashion Island regional shopping mall. It was created in the early 1960s as part of William Pereira's master plan for the Irvine Ranch. Newport Center was created as the unofficial "downtown" of the Irvine Ranch, which at the time extended all the way down to Pacific Coast Highway.

== History ==
It was the site used for the 1953 National Scout Jamboree of the Boy Scouts of America. The event was held where Newport Center and Fashion Island now sit. It was the third international jamboree; the first jamboree held west of the Mississippi River and had with 50,000 scouts from all 48 states, Alaska, Hawaii, and 16 foreign countries. It was one of the first sites considered for Disneyland. During excavation of the site for the first buildings, a considerable amount of petrified wood was discovered, indicating that a small forest once existed in the area.

The center was the brainchild of architect William Pereira and Irvine Company planner Ray Watson, with many of its buildings designed by Pereira and Welton Becket. The first building, at 400 Newport Center Drive, went up in 1967, with the majority of the center's buildings following in the 1970s, designed primarily in the International Style. Pereira's futurist Pacific Mutual building was added in 1972, which became one of Newport Beach's most well-known architectural landmarks. Newport Center and Fashion Island were named by Orange County advertising pioneer Leland Oliver Co., Inc. which also created the advertising and public relations for many years.

The strip of land between Avocado and MacArthur roads was originally slated to be an exit spur of the Pacific Coast Freeway, which was never built. It sat largely empty until the late 2000s when a library and park were constructed on the site.

== Economy ==
The center occupies a large city block between Jamboree, MacArthur and San Joaquin Hills roads, and Pacific Coast Highway. In the center of this block is a circular road, called Newport Center Drive, with high-rise buildings encircling the outside edge of the road. Numerous businesses are located along Newport Center Drive, including insurer Pacific Life, PIMCO, Janus Capital Group, Acacia Research Corporation, Irvine Company, Blackwood, and law firm Stradling Yocca Carlson & Rauth.

== Fashion Island ==
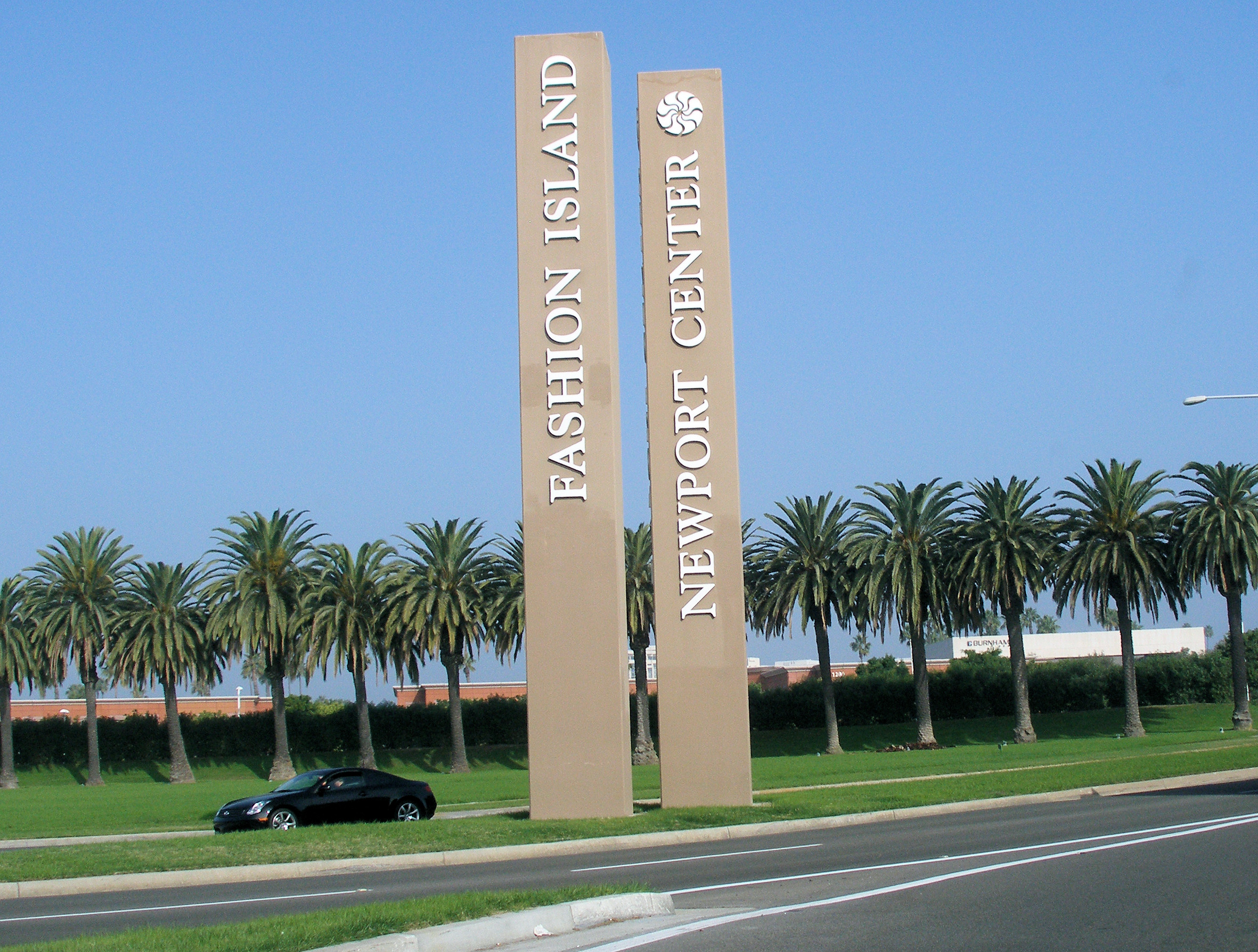
Main entrance to Newport Center and Fashion Island at intersection of Newport Center Drive and Highway 1

The center of the circle is occupied by Fashion Island regional shopping mall. Adjacent to the complex is the very upscale Big Canyon Country Club community.

== Transportation ==
Newport Center Drive is accessed from the outside by five roads, which are named after the Channel Islands of California. These roads split the center into "superblocks", each of which were built and leased as separate properties.

== Gallery ==
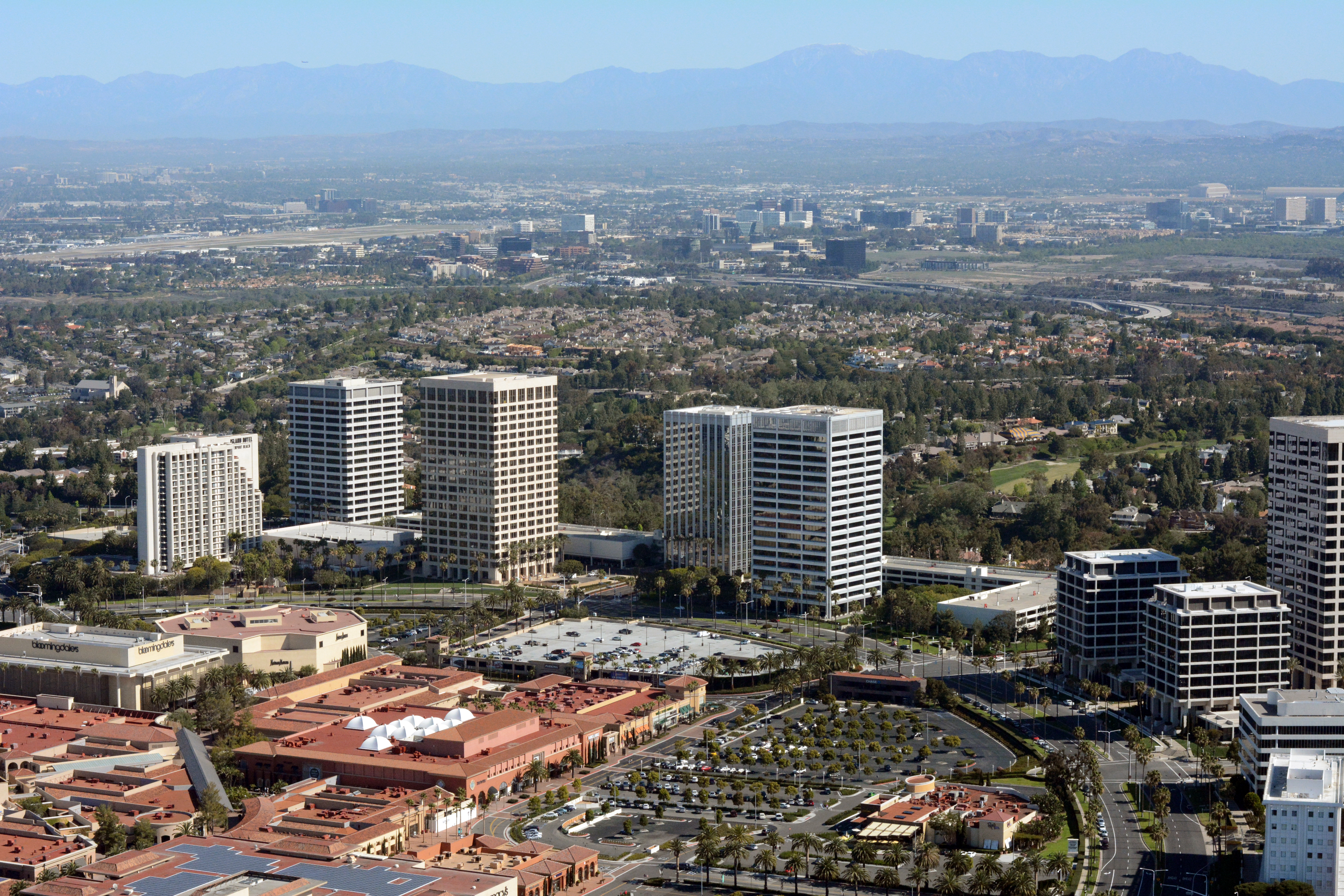

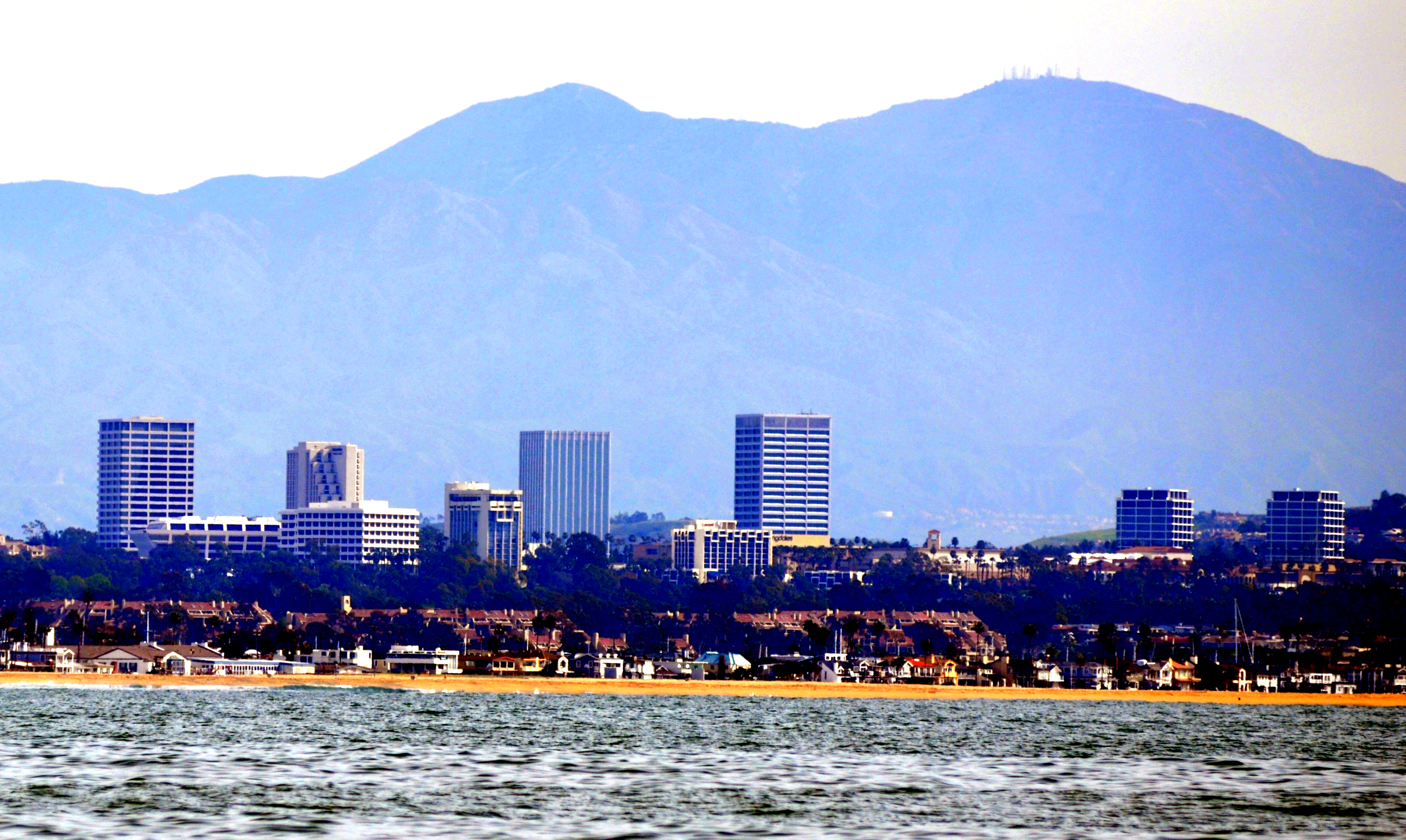
Newport Center with Balboa in the foreground

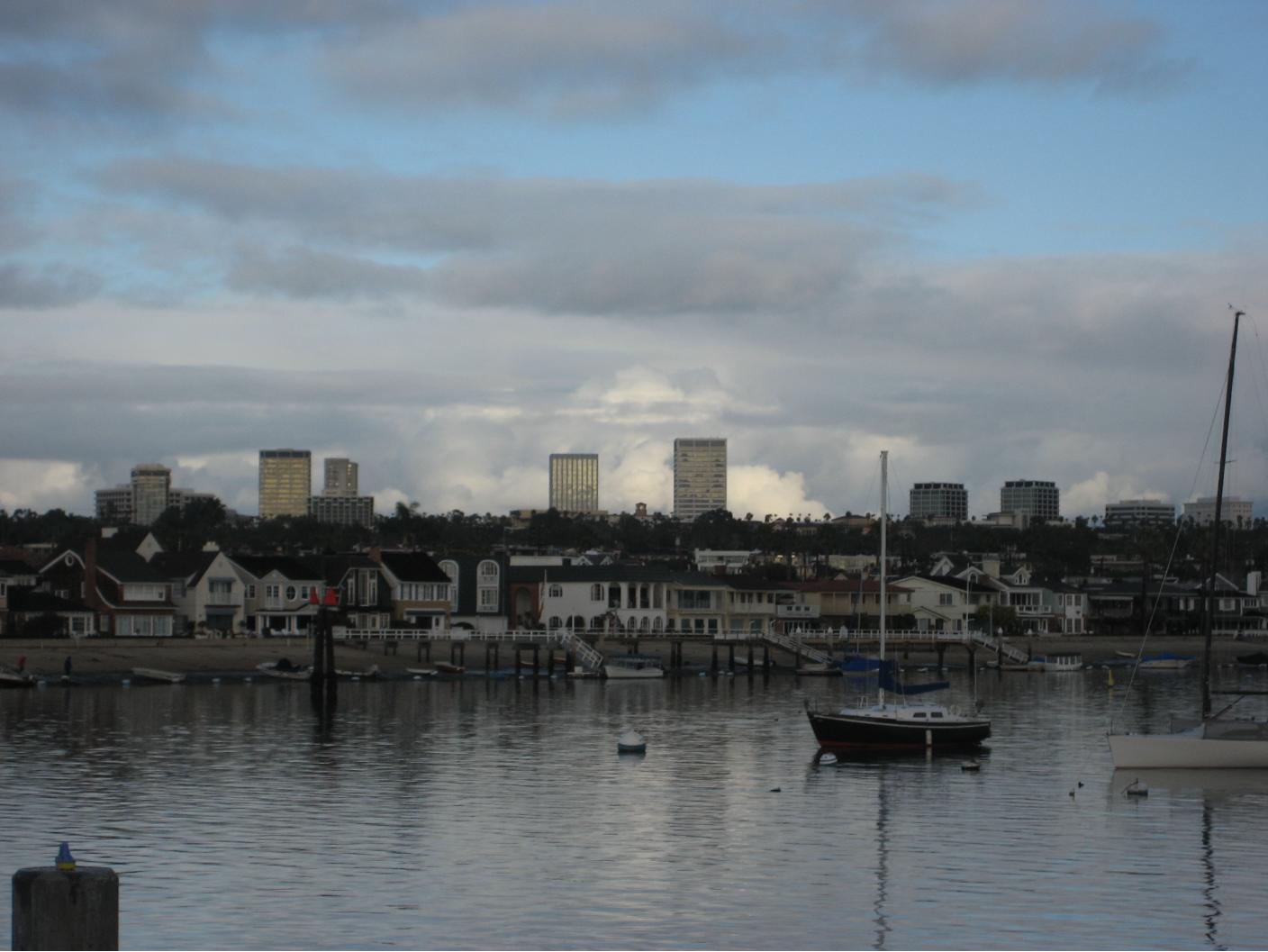
Newport Center from Balboa Peninsula

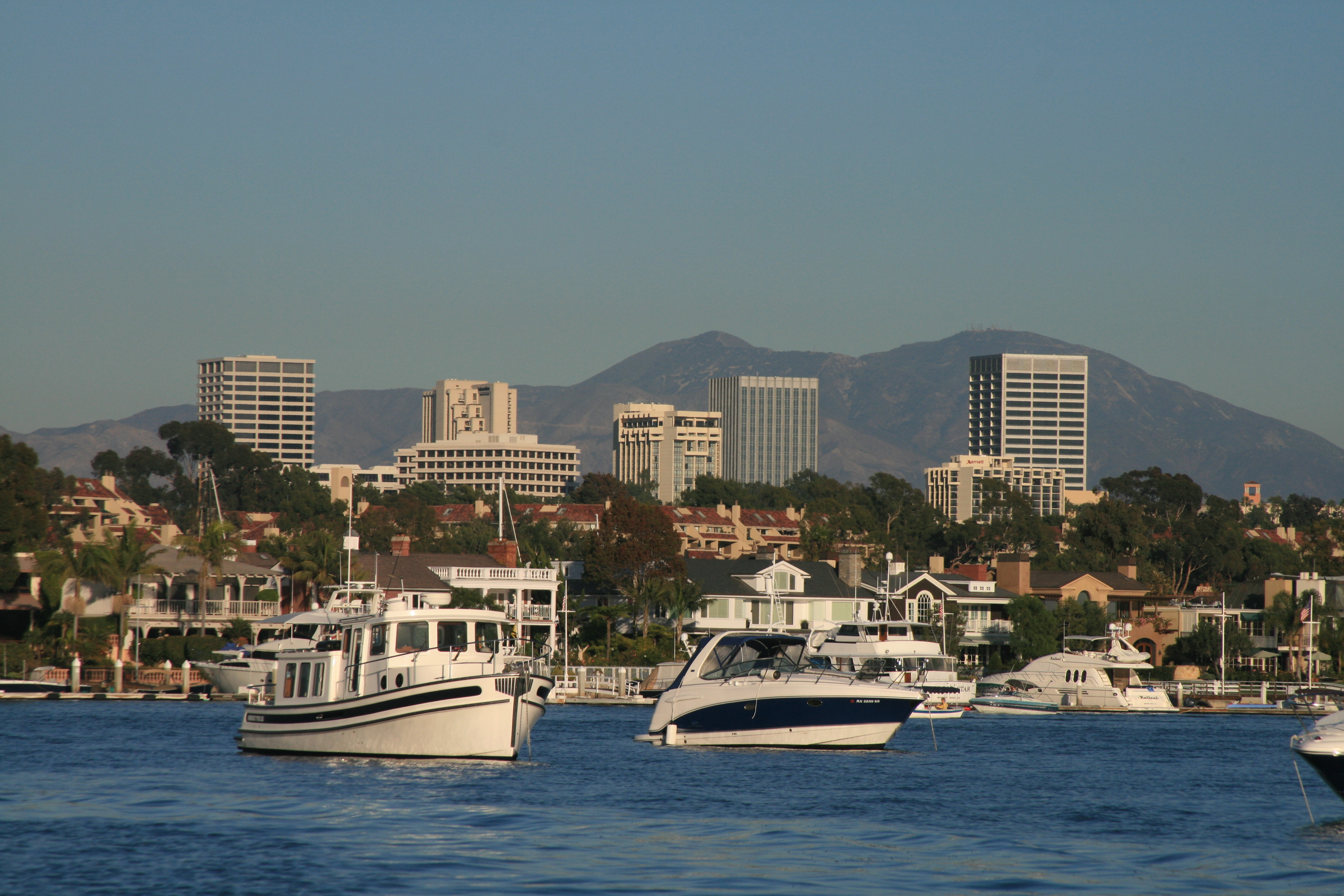
Newport Skyline

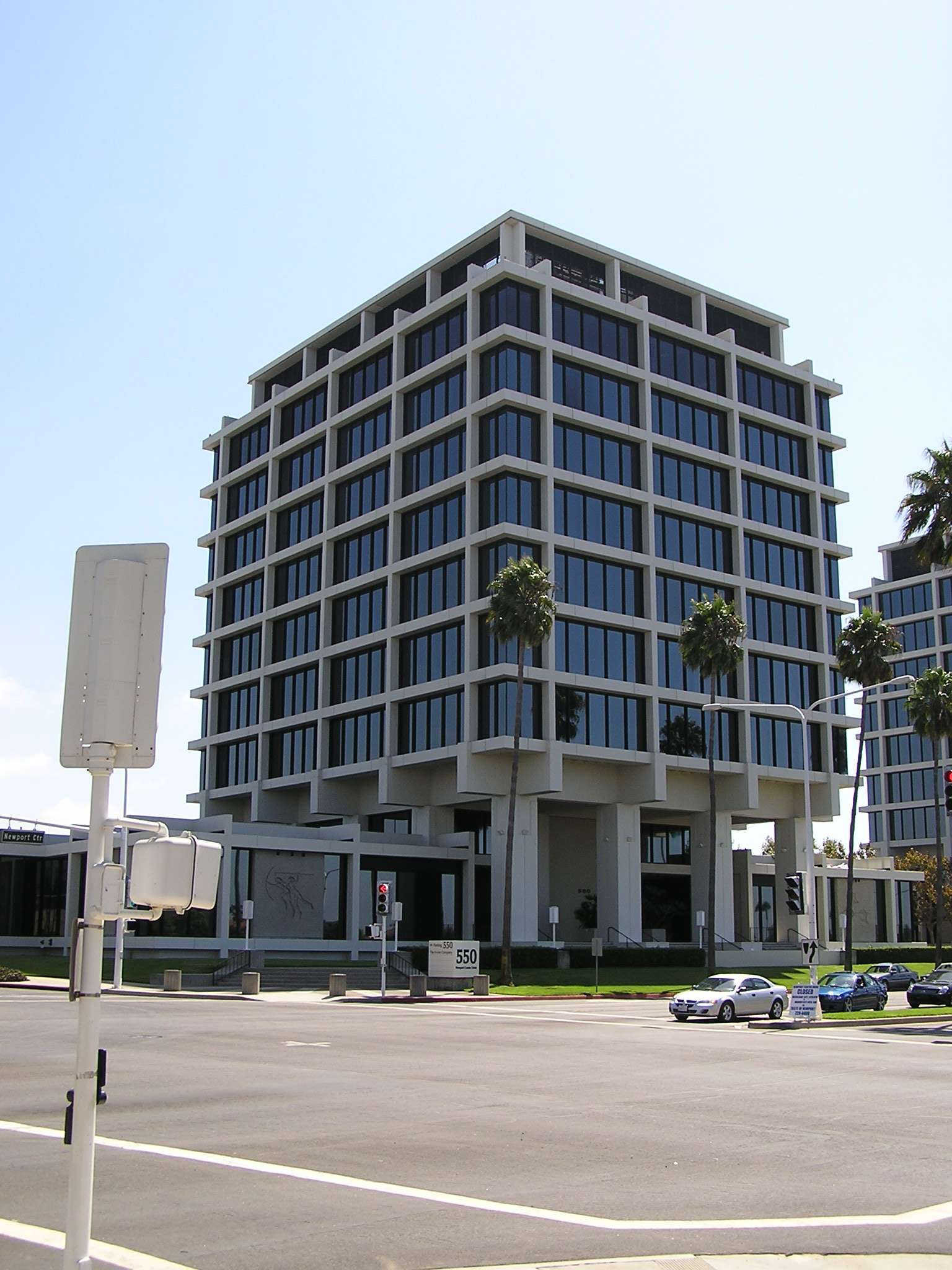
Irvine Company's HQ in Newport Center

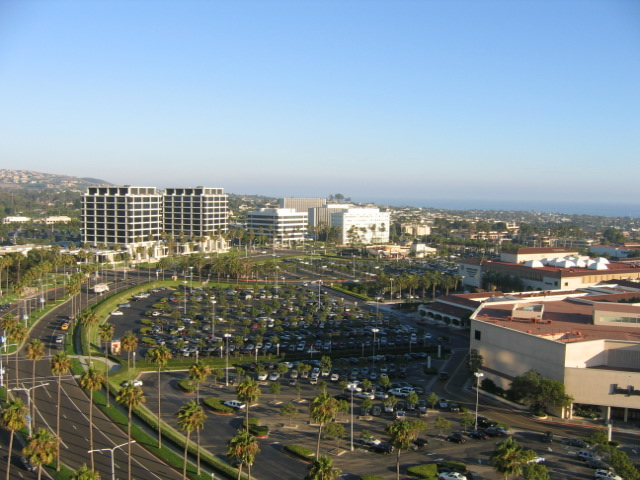
Fashion Island in Newport Center

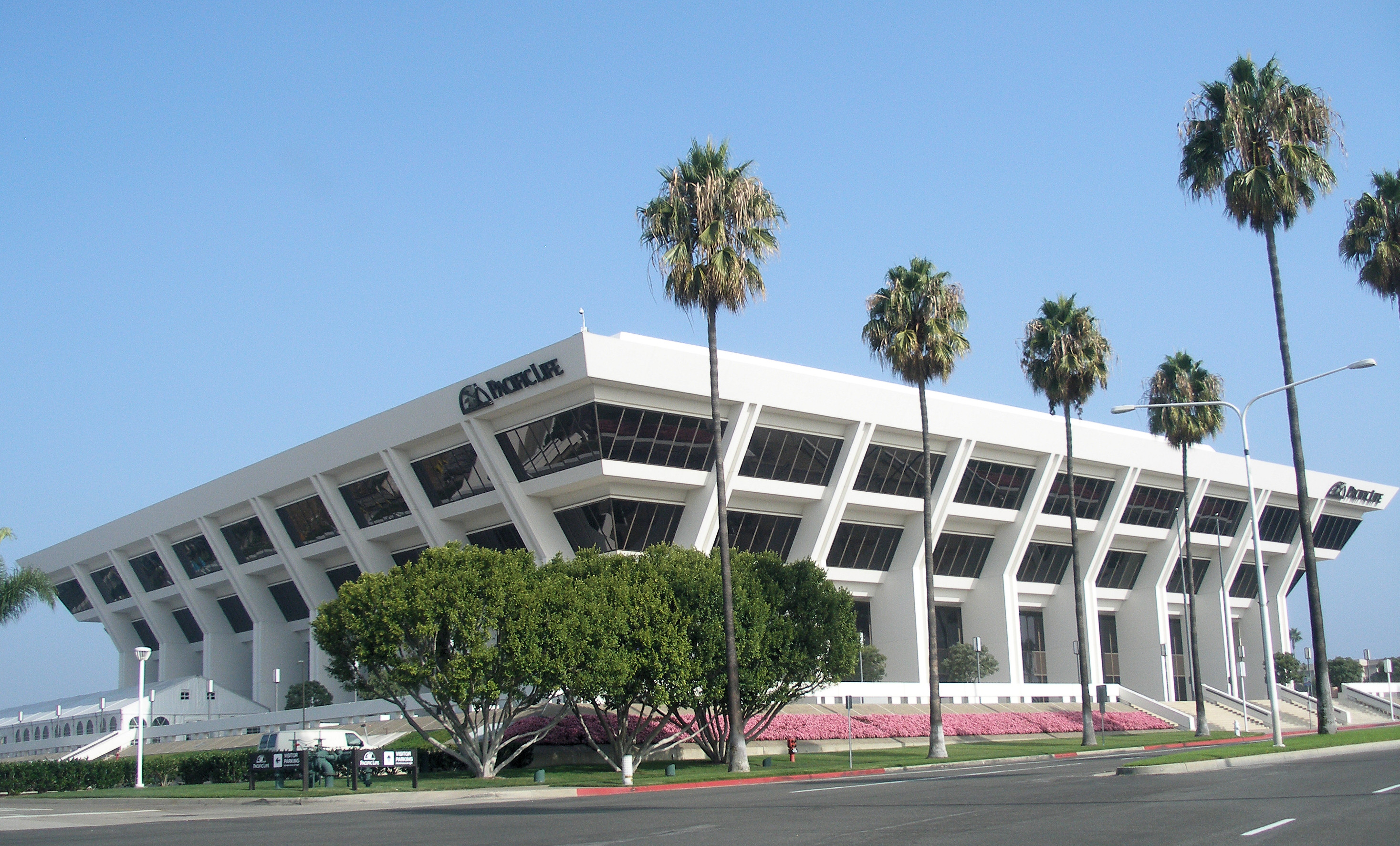
Pacific Life's HQ
