= Alexandra Morton =

Canadian-American scientist (born 1957)

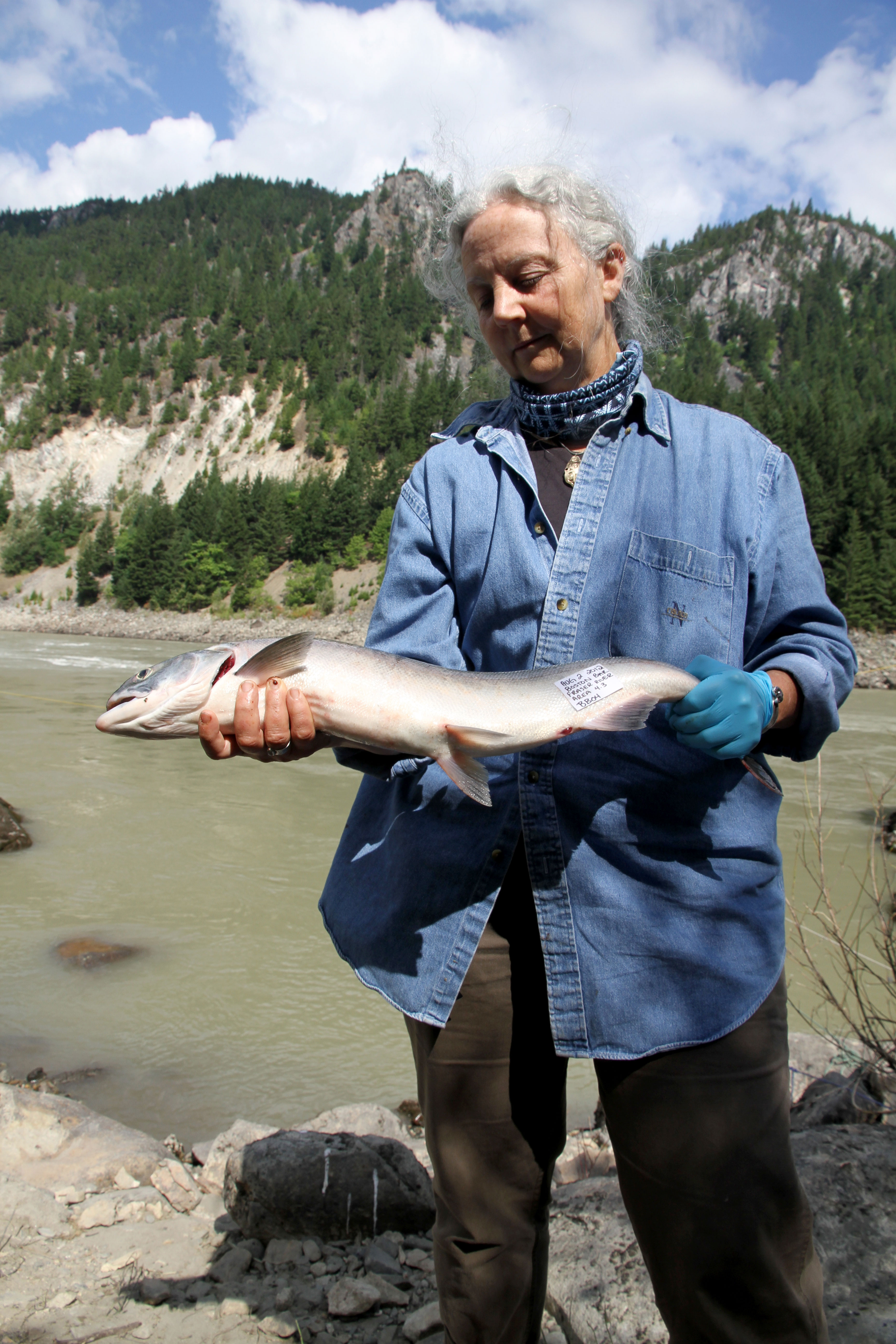
- Born: Alexandra Bryant Hubbard Morton; July 13, 1957 (age 69); Sharon, Connecticut, U.S.
- Citizenship: American, Canadian
- Education: American University
- Known for: Killer whale research, salmon research, conservation activism
- Mother: Barbara Marx Hubbard
- Scientific career
- Fields: Cetology, marine biology
- Workplaces: Raincoast Research Society

Alexandra Bryant Hubbard Morton (born 13 July 1957) is an American and Canadian marine biologist best known for her 30-year study of wild killer whales in the Broughton Archipelago in British Columbia. Since the 1990s, her work has shifted toward the study of the impact of salmon farming on Canadian wild salmon.

== Early life and education ==
Alexandra Bryant Hubbard was born on July 13, 1957, in Sharon, Connecticut. In her memoir, Listening to Whales, she said of her birthplace, "I can't imagine a more whaleless environment." Her father was an artist and her mother was writer Barbara Marx Hubbard. Her maternal grandfather was toy maker Louis Marx. Hubbard said that her passion for animals came from the time when she would explore the woods with her brother. In 1977, Morton started working with psychonaut John C. Lilly as a volunteer in the Human/Dolphin Society. She catalogued 2,000 audio recordings of bottlenose dolphins. She then graduated with a diploma from the American University.

== Study of captive orcas ==
While in California, Morton studied the communications of dolphins at Marineland of the Pacific in Palos Verdes. When she realized there were too many individuals in the tanks and that bottlenose dolphins were too quick to record their behaviour, Morton decided to shift her study towards Marineland's pair of killer whales, Orky and Corky, whom she had previously called "boring" because they spent long periods of time floating at the surface while calling back and forth to each other. Morton observed the pair when the female gave birth to the first orca conceived in captivity. She was interested in studying how baby orcas acquired new language. However, the calf died and none of Corky's other babies survived more than 45 days. Following the passing of each of the calves Morton recorded from Corky a behaviour that closely resembled mourning. The young mother lay on the bottom of the tank repeating the same calls over and over, stopping only to gulp another breath of air. The calls became raspy as the whale vocalized day and night. Morton also discovered that orcas invented games to distract themselves. One, the "Double Layout", consisted in Orky and Corky lying on their backs, putting their flukes on the platform next to the tank and raising their right flipper simultaneously. The most interesting behavior was the dawn greeting where both whales pressed their tongues against the tank wall where the first shaft of sunlight hit.

== Arrival in British Columbia ==
In 1979, Morton contacted pioneering killer whale researcher Michael Bigg who told her Corky and Orky had come from A5 Pod in northwestern British Columbia. He knew this from photographs of their capture as he could see the terrified young Corky pressed against the side of her mother. Dr. Bigg had photos of Corky's mother and her sisters and he knew they visited Johnstone Strait every summer near Alert Bay, British Columbia. Morton spent her summer there and found A5 pod as well as other killer whale families. The next summer, she returned to British Columbia and met Robin Morton. Alexandra Morton then permanently shifted her study to wild killer whales. Morton and her husband moved onto a boat so that they could easily follow whales. To support their work, Morton and her husband rented out their boat for tourists and researchers. In 1984, while following the A12 matriline in Northeastern Vancouver Island, Morton came across the village of Echo Bay, British Columbia, in the Broughton Archipelago. She and her husband decided to settle there to pursue their study of wild killer whales.

== Killer whale research ==
=== Photo-identification ===
In 1973, Michael Bigg developed a pioneering photo identification system consisting of photographing the dorsal fin and saddle patch of each killer whale encountered in Pacific Northwest waters. Starting in 1975, Bigg and his colleagues began assembling catalogues containing the genealogical tree of every killer whale family in British Columbia and an ID photo of each orca. Since arriving in the Broughton Archipelago, Morton has been one of the main contributors to theses catalogues, providing ID photos of northern resident as well as of transient killer whales.

=== Transient killer whales ===
For many years, only resident killer whales were intensely studied, as their predictable behaviour and highly stable social structure enabled researchers to follow them easily over a whole summer. Transients, however, have erratic route patterns which make them difficult to study. However, the Broughton Archipelago where Morton lived was frequented by many transient groups and since the mid eighties, Morton has been conducting the study of this little known community. One of her main findings has been that the differences in feeding habits between residents and transients lead each community to different lifestyles and behaviours. Transients, now named Biggs whales, eat only warm-blooded prey while residents eat only fish. She noted that transients, unlike residents, are mostly silent. As their mammalian prey have very good hearing, vocalizing could alert them of the predators approaching. Moreover, the seals and sea lions' good eyesight and their ability to teach their offspring make it imperative for transients to swim as stealthily as possible, thus explaining the transients' longer dives than residents and their habit of hiding their breath and clicks (used for echolocation) among other noises present in the sea. One transient Morton knew well used to hide behind her boat to avoid being detected by potential prey. In 1987, Morton expanded her study to pacific white-sided dolphins which had come back to the archipelago three years prior. In 2010 she won the Women of Discovery Sea Award.

=== Raincoast Research Society ===
In 1981, Morton founded Lore Quest (renamed Raincoast Research Society). Its original purpose was, according to its website, to "conduct year-round research on the acoustics of the orca of the British Columbia coast". Over the years, Raincoast Research has also been involved in making identification catalogues of the Pacific-White-Sided Dolphin population in British Columbia. Following the expansion of the salmon farming industry in the Broughton Archipelago, Raincoast Research Society has been a leader in studies on the impact of salmon farming and has provided support for a number of field workers and scientists interested in this subject.

Through Raincoast Research Society Morton has published extensively on the impact of sea lice from salmon farms on wild salmon. In 2011, Morton began the controversial work of tracking three European salmon farm virus in British Columbia, Canada, publishing in 2013 on the piscine reovirus.

== Salmon research and activism ==
Net-pen salmon farms arrived in British Columbia in the 1970s but began to proliferate by the late 1980s. By 2000, 90% of salmon farms in the province were Norwegian owned and contained Atlantic salmon. Since then, the salmon farming industry has grown, notably in the Broughton Archipelago. In the mid-2000s corporate giant Mitsubishi bought Cermaq, a company operating many salmon farms in BC.

Morton began to study the effects salmon farming brings to the coast of British Columbia, particularly to wild salmon populations, which experienced major declines in the years following the introduction of salmon farms in the area.

On May 12, 2015, Morton, as Director of Pacific Coast Wild Salmon Society, released a 24-page booklet, Salmon Confidential: The ugly truth about Canada's open-net salmon farms. The booklet makes the case that the wild-salmon-focused economy of British Columbia far outweighs the contributions of salmon farms. The booklet explores the issues of sea lice, impacts on lobster fisheries, challenges to bio-security, salmon viruses, exotic species, and the local economy. Director Twyla Roscovich's film of the same name and topic, Salmon Confidential, won the Best Canadian Environmental Documentary Award at the 2013 Vancouver International Film Festival. The film also had 1,517,446 views by May 8, 3013 on You Tube. It was also licensed by The Green Channel in 2018

In the spring of 2010, Morton helped found the social movement Salmon Are Sacred to raise awareness of the value of salmon to society.

In Dec 2020, Morton's research contributed to a decision by Canada's federal fisheries and oceans department to phase out all salmon farms in the narrow passages between Vancouver Island and the mainland, as their diseases were found to be decimating the native wild Pacific salmon with sea lice and viruses.

=== Petitions ===
Morton initiated two petitions, one called "Refuse to expand the salmon farming industry in BC", the other called "Divest Dirty Salmon". The first is to ask the Canadian government to stop allowing the expansion of salmon farms in British Columbia. The second is the ask Norwegian government to divest from salmon farming.

=== Lawsuits ===
In May 2013, Ecojustice lawyers, on behalf of Alexandra Morton, filed a lawsuit in Federal Court against the Minister of Fisheries and Oceans Canada (DFO) and Marine Harvest Canada Inc. The lawsuit was filed after learning that fish later confirmed to be infected with the piscine reovirus (PRV) had been transferred into an open-pen fish farm operated by Marine Harvest in Shelter Bay near Port Hardy, British Columbia. On May 6, 2015, the Court sided with Morton and struck down aquaculture licence conditions that allowed private companies to transfer fish infected with viruses to open-pen farms in the ocean.

=== Electoral politics ===
Morton ran as a candidate of the Green Party of British Columbia in the 2020 provincial election, coming in third, with 19.26% of the vote.

== Publications ==
=== Books ===
- 1998 "Heart of the Raincoast." (with Billy Proctor). Horsdal and Schubart, Victoria.
- 2002 Listening To Whales: What the Orcas Have Taught Us. Toronto: Random House. 30 December 2008. ISBN 9780307487544.
- 2004 Beyond the Whales: The Photographs and Passions of Alexandra Morton. Victoria, Canada: TouchWood Editions. 2004. ISBN 9781894898232.
- 2021 "Not on My Watch: How a Renegade Whale Biologist Took on Governments and Industry to Save Wild Salmon." Random House Canada.

=== Children's books ===
- 1991 "Siwiti: A Whale's Story." Orca Books, Victoria.
- 1993 "In the Company of Whales, from the Diary of a Whale Watcher." Orca Books Victoria.

== See also ==
- A4 Pod
- A5 Pod
- List of Northern Resident Killer Whale Pods
