= A30 matriline =

Orca matriline in British Columbia

The A30 matriline is the name given to the most commonly seen orca matriline in British Columbia. The matriline is currently made of 3 generations, with a total of 12 individuals. It is one of the 3 matrilines in A1 pod, one of the 10 pods of the A-clan. The matriline was present in over 60% of all of the encounters in the Johnstone Strait region, making it one of the best known matrilines. The group's size has increased, from 6 in the mid-1970s to 10 as of 2013 then 12 in 2017. It is most frequently seen in Johnstone Strait from late spring to early fall, often traveling with other pods of the Northern Resident Community.

== Current Individuals ==
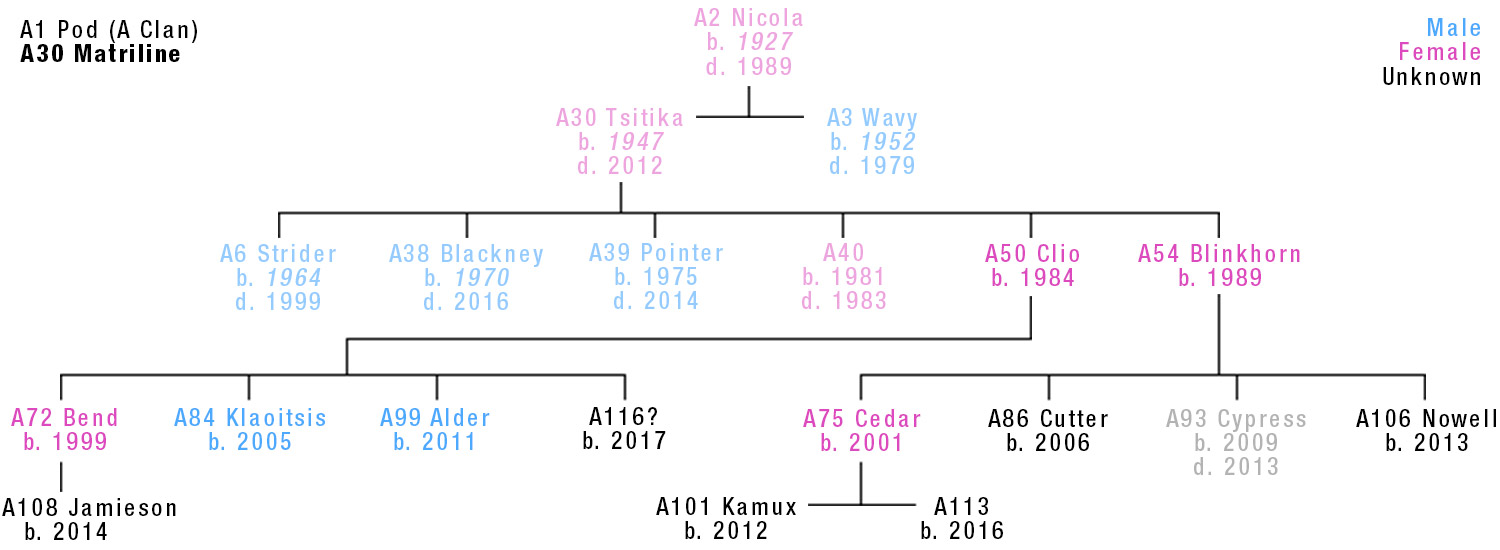
A2 Nicola and her descendants

- A50 Clio (b. 1984), Tsitika's oldest living daughter.
- A54 Blinkhorn (b. 1989), Tsitika's youngest daughter. She is also known as Minstrel. Blinkhorn became a mother at the early age of 12 with the birth of Cedar (A75) in 2001, and a grandmother at the age of 23 with the birth of Kamux (A101) in 2012.
- A72 Bend (b. 1999), Clio's first daughter. Bend has a distinctive cut at the middle of her dorsal fin, the cause of which is not known.
- A75 Cedar (b. 2001), Blinkhorn's first daughter. Cedar became a mother at the age of 11 with the birth of Kamux (A101) in 2012.
- A84 Klaoitsis (b. 2005), Clio's second offspring and eldest son. Some call him Klao for short.
- A86 Cutter (b. 2006), Blinkhorn's second offspring. A86's sex has not been determined yet.
- A99 Alder (b. 2011), Clio's third offspring and second son.
- A101 Kamux (b. 2012), Cedar's first offspring. A101's sex has not been determined yet.
- A106 Nowell (b. 2013), Blinkhorn's fourth offspring. A106's sex has not been determined yet.
- A108 Jamieson (b. 2014), Bend's first offspring. A108's sex has not been determined yet.
- A113 (b. 2016), Cedar's second offspring. A113's sex has not been determined yet.
- A118 (b. 2018), Blinkhorn's fifth offspring. A118's sex has not been determined yet.

== Deceased Individuals ==
- A3 Wavy (1952–1979), was Nicola's only son and was already mature when first identified, so he is estimated to have been born in the early 50s. He died in 1979.
- A40 (1981–1983), was Tsitika's fourth offspring born in 1981 and died in 1983. Little is known about A40 because of the little time this one had before her death.
- A2 Nicola (1927–1989), was one of the most famous and recognizable killer whales of the coast. She was Tsitika's mother and died in 1989, causing her daughter to become the matriarch. As Nicola was the oldest female of the subpod when the study began in the Pacific Northwest in 1973, it was first named "A2 subpod" and was later changed to A30. She was born around 1927.
- A6 Strider (1964–1999), was Tsitika's oldest son. He was very recognizable due to his notch near the top of his dorsal fin and with his two brothers, he formed a 3-bull trio, making the group very easy to identify. He was estimated to have been born around 1964 and died in 1999. Strider is also the known father of Sutlej (A45) making him the grandfather of Springer (A73).
- A30 Tsitika (1947–2012), born around 1947, Tsitika was one of the oldest killer whales in the northern resident community and one of the few orcas that was already a reproductive mother when first seen in the early 1970s. She was very recognizable due to the distinctive curve of her dorsal fin.
- A93 Cypress (2009–2013), Blinkhorn's third offspring. A93's sex was never determined.
- A39 Pointer (1975–2014), Tsitika's youngest son. Pointer's dorsal fin was very much like that of his older brother Blackney and the two were becoming difficult to tell apart.
- A38 Blackney (1970–2016), Tsitika's second-oldest son. At approximately 46 years old, Blackney was one of the oldest males in the northern resident community. He was also one of the largest, measuring 7,45 m. in length. Blackney had a particularly tall dorsal fin, slightly curved near the top like his mother's, which made him instantly recognizable. Blackney was most often seen swimming next to his mother while she was alive.
- A115 (2017–2018), Clio's second daughter. The Canadian DOF stated in its official 2018 report on the population status of Northern Resident killer whales that A115 was female and was declared dead in 2018.

== Research ==
This matriline has been studied extensively, particularly in order to establish vocal behavior among killer whales. One study of this matriline established that Killer Whales increase the use of family-specific calls shortly after the birth of a calf. This increased calling is believed to facilitate the learning of the family-based calls and assist in maintaining family cohesion. This matriline was also studied in an effort to understand how calls vary among pods and among matrilines within pods.

== Current status ==
As of 2018, the A30 matriline consists of twelve whales. In 1999 Tsitika's first grand calf arrived and that was Clio (A50)'s first offspring, Bend (A72). In 2012 Tsitika's first great-grand calf Kamux (A101) was born, while Tsitika died that same year at the approximate age of 65 years. Tsitika had a total of six offspring (two alive in 2017), while daughters Clio and Blinkhorn (A54) have each had at least four calves of their own, and their daughters Bend and Cedar have one and two calves respectively. The newest addition to the A30 matriline is Blinkhorn's fifth calf, A118, born in 2018. The A30s are still one of the most frequently encountered matrilines. In the summer, they are often seen in the company of other A1 subpods or with A4 or A5 Pod.

== See also ==
- A1 pod
- List of Northern Resident Killer Whale Pods
