= List of highways numbered 30 =

The following highways are numbered 30:

== International ==
- AH30 Asian Highway 30
- E30 European route E30

== Australia ==
- Albany Highway (State Route 30, Western Australia)

== Brazil ==
- BR-030

== Canada ==
- Alberta Highway 30 (defunct)
- British Columbia Highway 30
- Manitoba Highway 30
- Newfoundland and Labrador Route 30
- Cabot Trail, also known as Nova Scotia Trunk 30
- Ontario Highway 30 (former)
- Quebec Autoroute 30
- Saskatchewan Highway 30

== China ==
- G30 Expressway

== Cuba ==
- Highway 2–30

== Czech Republic ==
- I/30 Highway; Czech: Silnice I/30

== Greece ==
- EO30 road

== India ==
- NH 30

== Ireland ==
- N30 road (Ireland)

== Italy ==
- Autostrada A30

== Japan ==
- Japan National Route 30
- Seto-Chūō Expressway

== Korea, South ==
- Dangjin–Yeongdeok Expressway
- National Route 30
- Gukjido 30

== Malaysia ==
- New North Klang Straits Bypass
- FT 30 Putrajaya Ring Road

== New Zealand ==
- New Zealand State Highway 30
  - New Zealand State Highway 30A

== United Kingdom ==
- British A30 (Penzance-London)

== Turkey ==
- Otoyol 30
- State road D.030 (Turkey)

== Ukraine ==
- Highway M30 (Ukraine)

== United Arab Emirates ==
- E 30 road (United Arab Emirates)

== United States ==
- Interstate 30
- U.S. Route 30
  - U.S. Route 30N (disambiguation), several former sections
  - U.S. Route 30S (disambiguation), several former sections
- New England Route 30 (former)
- Alabama State Route 30
  - County Route 30 (Lee County, Alabama)
- Arizona State Route 30
- Arkansas Highway 30 (former)
- California State Route 30 (former)
  - County Route J30 (California)
  - County Route S30 (California)
- Colorado State Highway 30
- Connecticut Route 30
- Delaware Route 30
- Florida State Road 30
  - Florida State Road 30E
- Georgia State Route 30
- Hawaii Route 30
- Illinois Route 30 (former)
- K-30 (Kansas highway)
- Kentucky Route 30
- Louisiana Highway 30
  - Louisiana State Route 30-E (former)
- Maryland Route 30
  - Maryland Route 30BC
  - Maryland Route 30BZ
  - Maryland Route 30C (former)
  - Maryland Route 30D (former)
- Massachusetts Route 30
- M-30 (Michigan highway)
- Minnesota State Highway 30
  - County Road 30 (Chisago County, Minnesota)
  - County Road 30 (Dakota County, Minnesota)
  - County Road 30 (Hennepin County, Minnesota)
  - County Road 30 (Ramsey County, Minnesota)
- Mississippi Highway 30
- Missouri Route 30
- Nebraska Highway 30 (former)
  - Nebraska Spur 30B
  - Nebraska Spur 30C
  - Nebraska Spur 30D
  - Nebraska Spur 30H
- Nevada State Route 30 (former)
- New Jersey Route 30 (former)
  - County Route 30 (Bergen County, New Jersey)
  - County Route 30 (Monmouth County, New Jersey)
  - County Route 30 (Ocean County, New Jersey)
- New Mexico State Road 30
- New York State Route 30
  - County Route 30 (Cattaraugus County, New York)
  - County Route 30 (Chenango County, New York)
  - County Route 30 (Delaware County, New York)
  - County Route 30 (Dutchess County, New York)
  - County Route 30 (Erie County, New York)
  - County Route 30 (Essex County, New York)
  - County Route 30 (Genesee County, New York)
  - County Route 30 (Montgomery County, New York)
  - County Route 30 (Otsego County, New York)
  - County Route 30 (Putnam County, New York)
  - County Route 30 (Rockland County, New York)
  - County Route 30 (Schenectady County, New York)
  - County Route 30 (Schoharie County, New York)
  - County Route 30 (Suffolk County, New York)
  - County Route 30 (Ulster County, New York)
  - County Route 30 (Washington County, New York)
  - County Route 30 (Westchester County, New York)
  - County Route 30 (Yates County, New York)
- North Carolina Highway 30
- North Dakota Highway 30
- Ohio State Route 30 (1923-1927) (former)
- Oklahoma State Highway 30
- South Carolina Highway 30
- South Dakota Highway 30
- Tennessee State Route 30
- Texas State Highway 30
  - Texas State Highway Spur 30
  - Farm to Market Road 30
  - Texas Park Road 30
- Utah State Route 30
- Vermont Route 30
- Virginia State Route 30
- Washington State Route 30 (former)
- Wisconsin Highway 30
- Wyoming Highway 30

Territories

- Puerto Rico Highway 30
- U.S. Virgin Islands Highway 30

== Vietnam ==
- National Road 30 (Vietnam)

== See also ==
- List of A30 roads
- List of highways numbered 30A

Preceded by 29	Lists of highways 30	Succeeded by 31
