= Springer (orca) =

Wild Female orca from the Northern Resident community (born c. 2000)

Springer A73
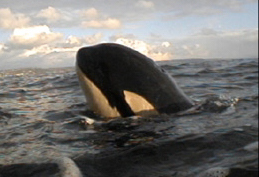
- Two-year-old Springer in Puget Sound, 2002
- Species: Orcinus orca (Northern Resident)
- Sex: Female
- Born: c. 2000
- Parent: Sutlej (A45) (mother) (1983–2001)
- Offspring: Spirit (A104) (born 2013); Storm (A116) (born 2017); Possible third calf (born in 2022 through 2024)

Springer (born c. 2000), officially named A73, is a wild orca from the Northern Resident Community of orcas, which frequents the waters off the northern part of Vancouver Island every summer. In January 2002, Springer, then a calf developmentally equivalent to a human toddler, was discovered alone and emaciated some 250 miles from the territory of her family (called a "pod"). Experts identified Springer by her vocal calls that are specific to her pod, and by examining photographs of her eye patch. They were also able to determine where Springer's pod was currently located.

After months of heated public debate, a decision was made by the United States National Marine Fisheries Service (NMFS) to capture the young orca and attempt to reintegrate her into her pod. On June 12, 2002, Springer was captured and moved to a seapen in Manchester, Washington. On July 13, after medical treatment and rehabilitation, Springer was transported to Johnstone Strait, British Columbia, and held in a seapen at Dong Chong Bay, Hanson Island. The next morning, Springer was released near her close relatives. In October, she was seen traveling with her pod to the open ocean. The following July, she returned to Johnstone Strait with the same pod.

Springer has been observed with her pod in Johnstone Strait every year since her rescue and translocation, becoming the only orca in history to be successfully reintegrated into a wild population after human intervention. In July 2013, 11 years after her rescue, Springer was seen off the central British Columbia coast with a new calf and is considered to be a contributing member of that population. In 2017, Springer was seen with another calf, who was confirmed to be her second offspring.

== Appearance in Puget Sound ==
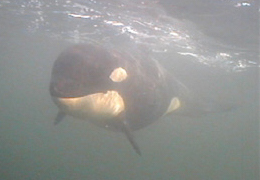
Springer's family was traced through analysis of her vocal dialect. Her mother was "Sutlej," who probably died in 2001.

Although there were possible sightings in early January 2002 of either a juvenile orca or false killer whale in northern Puget Sound near the town of La Conner, Washington, Springer was first confirmed by researchers and reported to news media on January 14 when she was spotted swimming alone near the Vashon Island ferry dock south of Seattle. At that time, she was 11 feet (3.4 m) long and estimated to be between 18 and 36 months old. Springer's presence was immediately regarded as a mystery, as orcas are rarely observed alone, and mothers never leave young offspring unattended.

As advocates and researchers worked to identify this strange visitor to Seattle, grave concern arose over her presence in the waters off a major metropolitan area. In one of the first media reports on January 19, the public was urged to resist the temptation to interact with this highly sociable orca, not to try to capture up-close photographs or video of her, or worse yet, do what was reportedly already happening, try to feed her. "The message we want to get out to boaters is, no matter how much you want to help this whale, do not approach it, don't feed it," Orca Conservancy representatives warned on KING-TV (NBC Seattle). "A fed whale is a dead whale."

Despite the warnings, Springer became an instant celebrity, appearing regularly on the news in the United States and Canada. The beach community of West Seattle took on the look of a marine park. The orca's interactions with humans increased. The situation became untenable.

=== Identification ===
Killer whale experts tried to solve the mystery of this solitary, social orca, initially known to locals and ferry workers as "Baby Orphan Orca" ("Boo") or "Little Orcan Annie." They pored over high-resolution photographs taken of the young orca's markings. They also hoped to find clues in the orca's calls, which are distinctive to her pod.

The orcas of Washington state and British Columbia coasts have been extensively studied since the pioneering work of Michael Bigg in the early 1970s. Each of approximately 500 orcas which frequent these waters is named, and experienced observers recognize individuals by their unique body markings and the shape of each orca's dorsal fin. Birth records of each orca have created detailed family trees. They are considered the best-known marine mammal population in the world.

Orcas in the region's inner coastal waters take two forms, "resident" and "transient" (also known as Bigg's killer whales), two eco-types that are similar in appearance but have different diets and social structures and do not interbreed. The different orca pods have developed their own unique vocalizations, using distinctive sets of calls, known as "dialects." Closely related groups have more similar dialects than more distant relatives.

In February 2002, recordings and photographs of Springer in Puget Sound were sent to Paul Spong and Helena Symonds of OrcaLab and Department of Fisheries and Oceans (DFO) Canada biologist John Ford, who determined that the killer whale belonged to a group of around 215 killer whales known as the Northern Resident Community, ranging some 250 miles north, a group rarely seen in the Puget Sound area. Resident killer whales leave the coast each fall; their migration routes are still relatively unknown.

It was known that A45, a female killer whale from this community, and her calf A73 had not returned to Johnstone Strait the previous summer and were both feared to be dead. Through assessment of the orca's dialect, she was confirmed to be A73, offspring of A45, also known as "Sutlej." Orca fathers do not play a role in rearing their young, so Springer is considered an orphan. Her closest maternal relatives are other members of the matriline (subpod) known as A24, which is in the pod known as A4. A73 had been given the nickname "Springer" shortly after her birth. Like many of the region's killer whales, she is named after a geographical feature – Springer Point in southern Johnstone Strait.

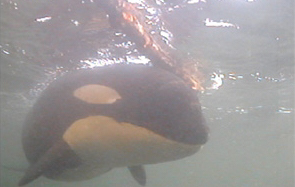
Springer nuzzles up to a floating log in Puget Sound

=== Health and welfare concerns ===
Springer had developed a pattern of approaching and rubbing against boats, creating a high risk of being hit by a vessel in the busy area or capsizing a small boat. Robert McLaughlin, Robert Wood, and Michael Kundu of the Seattle-based group, Project SeaWolf, began regularly observing and tracking the calf on the water, documenting a number of orca-boat interactions, including potentially dangerous interactions with private boats and a Washington State ferry. The group captured surface and underwater video of the orca that they disseminated to the media, urging federal intervention. Springer's attraction to boats and floating logs was attributed to needing social interaction and touch. John Ford observed later that, "She didn't have whales to associate with down there, so boats sort of became a replacement for that for social reasons."

Although Springer had been weaned from her mother and was able to forage on her own, she was underweight and in poor health, being malnourished, having ketoacidosis, worms, and an itchy skin condition. Orcas are highly social and form extremely strong family bonds. Resident orcas remain with their mothers and maternal relatives their entire lives.

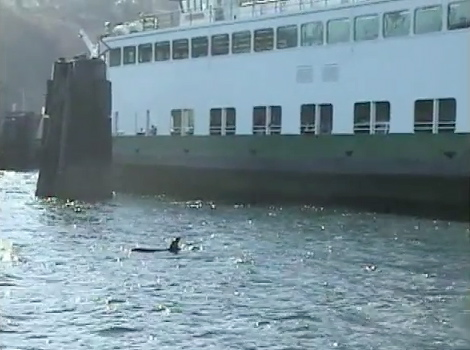
Springer hanging out at the Fauntleroy Ferry in Seattle

=== Public debate ===
The orphaned orca's fate soon became a hotly debated public issue. Some feared Springer might be removed to a captive-display facility, even though a Stipulation of Dismissal in the 1976 lawsuit of Washington v. Don Goldsberry, SeaWorld, et al legally prohibited marine parks from capturing wild orcas in Puget Sound. Some argued that federal authorities should not intervene and rescue the young orca, even if the animal was likely to die alone in one of the most congested, contaminated waterways in North America, as scientists warned.

"It's going to be heart-breaking if we see the worst thing happen, which is to see her die," activist Donna Sandstrom of Orca Alliance (now head of the Washington state nonprofit The Whale Trail) explained on KING 5 News (NBC Seattle), "but we would rather bear that heartbreak than to know she's enduring it alone in a concrete tank." Sandstrom became an outspoken critic of direct intervention by NMFS in the local media, often pitted against advocates calling for Springer's rescue and return to her family in British Columbia. While advocates, researchers and scientists pushed since mid-January for immediate federal action to save this wayward whale, the beginning of March brought a new discord of opinions on the matter.

Activists like Howard Garrett of the Whidbey Island, Washington-based Orca Network also argued against rescuing Springer, and favored the federal government authorizing a "Social Approach," the introduction of regular human companionship for the orca, to put divers in the water with her to address the orca's social needs until she left Puget Sound on her own. Garrett's proposal of introducing regular human contact to a solitary, social, displaced orca in a major metropolitan area was considered by many scientists and advocates as potentially disastrous.

The Oregon Coast Aquarium (OCA) in Newport, Oregon where the orca Keiko was kept prior to his translocation to Iceland, offered its facilities to rehabilitate Springer for a one-year period, after which a scientific panel would determine whether or not she was fit to return to Johnstone Strait, BC. Media reports soon revealed that OCA was deep in debt and bound by an agreement with the Free Willy-Keiko Foundation (FWKF) that Keiko's former tank, built by FWKF, could never again house a wild orca. Furthermore, growing scientific opinion was that rehabilitating Springer in a concrete tank would further acclimate the orca to humans and likely result in permanent captivity. It was also widely reported that OCA was in financial hardship due to controversial loans taken out for renovations. It soon withdrew its offer. In July, OCA's Executive Director, Phyllis Bell, would "resign her post with little explanation."

In these first critical weeks of the Springer debate, Seattle-based non-profit Orca Conservancy, which would later emerge as the lead U.S. non-government organization in a similar, highly publicized effort to rescue and repatriate another displaced resident killer whale, L98, or Luna, hit the local airwaves, repeatedly calling upon authorities to act immediately to rescue Springer and return her to her family in Johnstone Strait. As reported on KING 5 News, the group initially proposed a "Namu Shuttle," a scientifically peer-reviewed proposal to lure the orca into a hydrodynamic floating sea pen and tow it north — a plan employed successfully in 1965 by Ted Griffin to translocate Namu over 400 miles from British Columbia to Seattle. The distance from Seattle to Springer's repatriation site is approximately 250 miles.

Another option the group presented to the National Marine Fisheries Service was to transport the orca aboard a high-speed hovercraft the Canadian Consulate believed it could source from its Coast Guard. The overriding component of all these rescue options was to minimize human contact and keep the orca in the water as much as possible, provide medical treatment and draw blood samples in situ (in the water), expedite medical tests and clearances with Department of Fisheries and Oceans Canada, and target a speedy translocation and reintroduction in Johnstone Strait in July, when Springer's pod historically returns to its summer habitat.

As the weeks unfolded, NMFS officials chose not to intervene, stating it lacked both the funds and the confidence that a rescue, translocation and reunion was possible. No cetacean had ever been re-integrated into a wild pod after human intervention. Another orca, Keiko, had been released into the wild in 2002 after spending most of his life in captivity, and although the orca who played Willy in Free Willy found freedom, he never found his family. Aside from some interactions with other wild whales, Keiko lived alone until his death in Norway in 2003. Scientists considered the possibility that Springer had been rejected by her pod (although resident orcas had never been known to do this). They feared Springer's pod might respond to her reappearance by a physical attack. Also, the increasing habituation with humans and vessels could jeopardize a successful return to the wild and humans could be endangered by Springer's close contacts with small boats.

Springer's uncertain health was also a concern. Canadian officials refused to accept an orca with any communicable diseases. Returning Springer to her home waters would require the political, scientific, logistical and financial cooperation of federal agencies and multiple organizations in two countries, as well as the consent of the First Nations. Capturing and moving an orca risked further stress and injury.

Local media continued to cover the crisis intensively, with advocates still demanding immediate government action to save the whale, as Springer's health was deteriorating and her dangerous attraction to boats and people (and people to Springer) increasing. The prospect of federally protected young orca washing up dead on one of Seattle's most-visited beaches grew every day.

In late February, NMFS convened a panel of experts to discuss what to do. Brian Gorman of NMFS called the decision "a thorny one," but added that letting nature take its course "realistically is not an option. She's in a very public location. People will want to feed her."

Despite laws prohibiting the removal of any wild whale in Puget Sound to a marine aquarium, some activists continued to argue in the local media against a rescue, concerned that human intervention would lead to a life in captivity for the orca. Others assured that protections were in place to prevent that from happening.

=== Monitoring program ===
As the debate continued, NMFS urged the public to keep away from Springer, and officially authorized a volunteer, on-the-water monitoring project proposed by three Washington-based nonprofit organizations possessing the marine vessel resources to keep track of the calf — the Whale Museum in Friday Harbor, and Project SeaWolf. The highly experienced non-government monitoring team took shifts monitoring Springer and keeping the public away. But the growing number of onlookers were making the effort unsustainable.

As time went on and the orca's prognosis worsened, the idea of directly intervening on behalf of Springer and returning her to her family in Canada was soon catching on. Public opinion was now strongly in favor of rescuing the orca, and to do everything possible to keep her out of a concrete tank. On March 13, KOMO-TV (ABC Seattle) reported a "ground-breaking coalition," announcing that Orca Conservancy, the Keiko team and Vancouver Aquarium had tentatively agreed to combine their plans—the only ones submitted to NMFS that called for rehabilitation in a seapen and an expedited translocation and repatriation to her natal pod. The organizations reportedly had agreed to "pool their resources" on behalf of Springer, including a pledge the Keiko team secured from a private, anonymous donor to fund the entire project. Upon hearing this rare pledge of cooperation between anti-captivity organizations and a captive-display facility, NMFS announced its decision — it would intervene to save Springer, and would go with the combined seapen rehabilitation/translocation/reintroduction plan, with Vancouver Aquarium as the lead non-government organization on the Canadian side.

Shortly after the NMFS announcement and without explanation, Vancouver Aquarium backed out of the coalition. The NMFS-approved plan to rescue and repatriate Springer would still go forward, but because of the Aquarium's change-of-heart, the effort was again without funding. NMFS could not shoulder the costs of the project, and Vancouver Aquarium made it very clear that they had no interest in doing so, either. Unless a new funding source was located immediately, the intervention could not happen. Springer's prognosis in Puget Sound was getting worse every day.

=== Prescott Grant and Orphaned Orca Fund ===
Conservationists then presented an idea to NMFS — the Springer project could be funded by the newly established John H. Prescott Marine Mammal Rescue Assistance Grant, taking advantage of language inserted by Washington's Congressional delegation that provided "priority consideration for gray whale and orca strandings in the Pacific Northwest." Although not a stranded whale, if Springer were deemed by NMFS as a "pending stranding," the agency might be able to expedite the Prescott money. NMFS agreed to the plan.

Applications were made for two $100,000 USD grants, with a requirement that both be triggered by 1/3 matching contributions, or a total of $66,667 USD. NMFS invited five nonprofit organizations to form the "Orphaned Orca Fund" (OOF) to raise the matching funds for the Prescott grants — Orca Alliance, Project SeaWolf, People for Puget Sound, The Whale Museum and Orca Conservancy. Free Willy-Keiko Foundation/Earth Island Institute and Friends of the San Juans would soon join OOF at the invitation of Orca Conservancy. The new coalition immediately passed a Motion that stated that "no funds raised by OOF can be used to remove A73 to a marine facility."

The next day, Project SeaWolf resigned from OOF. But the group continued assisting the Springer project in material ways, particularly when the time came to rescue and repatriate the orca.

The public response to helping Springer was overwhelming. In a matter of weeks, OOF successfully raised the matching funds to trigger the Prescott grants. There was now approximately $266,666 USD in cash and in-kind services and equipment available to the project, by most accounts more than enough to get Springer home.

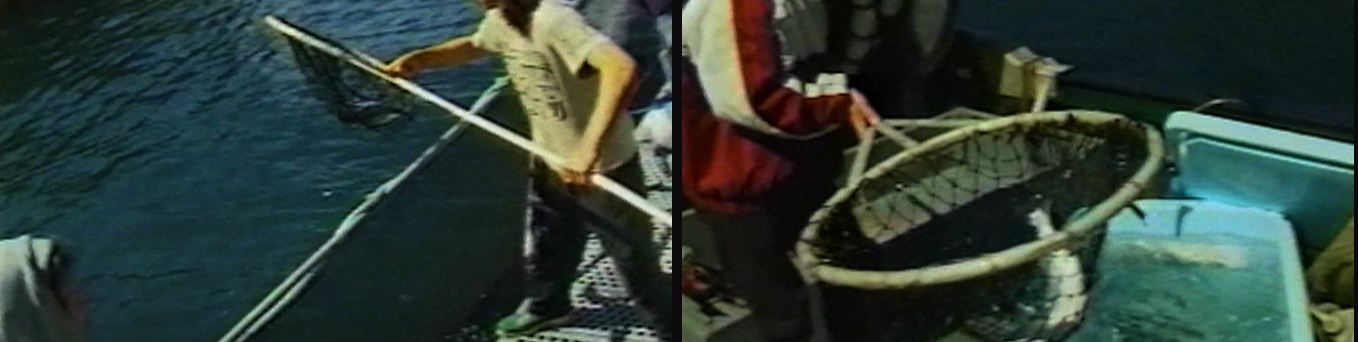
Under contract from the Orphaned Orca Fund and a special out-of-season permit from DFO Canada, Namgis First Nation fishermen load 73 wild-caught Pacific salmon into Springer's seapen in Dong Chong Bay, Hanson Island, BC.

=== Namgis First Nation enlisted to catch wild salmon for Springer ===
During one OOF meeting in June, a Motion was made by Orca Conservancy, on behalf of Spong and OrcaLab to use OOF funds to contract commercial fishermen from the Namgis First Nation of Johnstone Strait to catch and provide wild salmon for Springer while she was in her sea pen in Dong Chong Bay, Hanson Island, the repatriation site and territory of the Namgis. If the money were approved, Spong would help arrange an out-of-season fishing permit from DFO, and Namgis Chief Bill Cranmer would put together a boat and crew. Bob McLaughlin of Project SeaWolf, together with Lynne Barre from NMFS and other activists urged instead the use of farmed Atlantic salmon provided by a local aquaculture company, even though the First Nations and a vast majority of orca advocates in the region, including renowned local scientist Alexandra Morton, were adamantly opposed to fish farms in their waters. It was argued that the logistics of feeding Springer wild fish was too much to take on for the team, particularly so close to the capture date. There was also a question of whether OOF had the authority to directly contract vendors with its donations, although it was agreed that the coalition's by-laws did not specifically preclude it from doing so.

After much discussion, Barre agreed that NMFS would not oppose the Namgis contract, on the condition that OOF provide a metal detector at the seapen site to screen the wild salmon for fishhooks which could pose a danger to Springer. When that was argued to be impractical, NMFS finally assented on a personal assurance from OOF members that they would be at the site when the salmon came in, physically inspecting the mouth of each fish for hooks prior to their placement into the seapen. The Motion passed and the Namgis were contracted. The First Nations were now appropriately participating in the return of a wayward kukawin, or orca, to their ancestral waters. And a potential conflict unfolding before the eyes of the world media was averted. No farmed Atlantic salmon would be brought into Namgis territory.

== Capture and rehabilitation ==
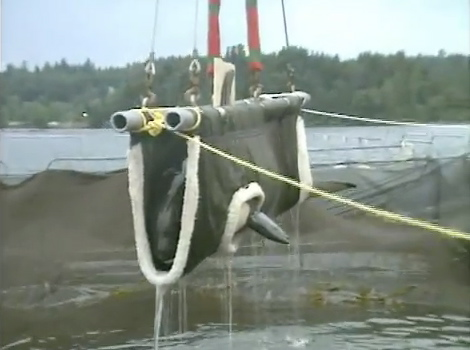
Springer lowered into a sea pen in Manchester

The team to capture Springer was led by Jeff Foster, who had helped prepare Keiko for release. On June 13, with news helicopters circling overhead sending live video to millions of viewers, Foster's team lured the orca close to the capture boat, and then Foster got in the water, carefully placed a soft rope around Springer's tail, gently moved her into a sling and hoisted her into the boat. By all accounts, the operation went smoothly, and the rescue was underway.

Springer was then moved to a sea pen at a government research station in Manchester. For four weeks, she was given live salmon and tested for medical conditions. To avoid creating a dependency on humans, staff kept their contact with her to a minimum and released food into her pen at random times of day. Her food, sometimes laced with medication, was delivered via a chute that was arranged so that Springer could not see the person putting the food into the chute. Her health improved and she began to eat more, approaching 60–80 pounds of fish per day needed to increase her weight. After medical tests revealed no genetic disorders or communicable diseases, Springer was cleared for a return to Canada.

Another hurdle was to secure a means of transport for the whale's 250-mile journey. A truck ride would have been long and bumpy, and an airplane prohibitively expensive. Project SeaWolf’s Bob McLaughlin persuaded a boat building company from Whidbey Island, Nichols Brothers Boat Builders, to donate use of the Catalina Jet, a 144-foot-long catamaran capable of traveling more than 40 mph.

Springer's move to her home waters needed to be well-timed to maximize her chances of re-integrating into a wild pod. To minimize her habituation to humans, she needed to be moved as soon as possible and had to be released during the time her pod was usually present in Johnstone Strait between May 6 and July 25, usually in mid-July. On July 9, OrcaLab detected orca calls closely related to Springer's, moving towards Johnstone Strait. On July 10, the A-11 matriline, her extended family, appeared in Johnstone Strait.

=== Return to Johnstone Strait ===
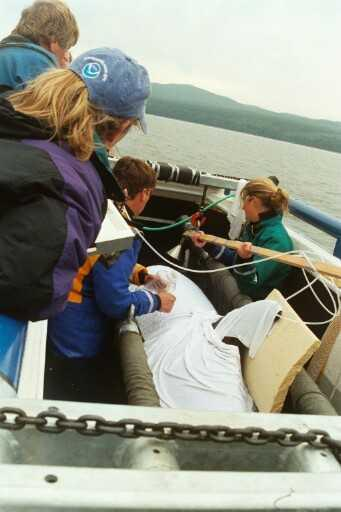
Springer prepared for the 13-hour journey

On July 12, under the watch of news helicopters, Springer was lifted by crane from the holding pen and placed in a specially constructed shallow pool aboard the catamaran. The boat departed Manchester but broke down shortly after it began its journey north. Plastic debris was sucked into one of the catamaran's intakes, damaging the high-speed vessel. The team decided to head back to the dock, put Springer back in the sea pen, and wait for the next day.

The operation got underway the next day without incident. Springer was brought north through Puget Sound and Haro Strait, across the border and then to Campbell River, where locals donated hundreds of bags of ice to help keep the orca cool. To keep her skin from drying out or becoming sunburned during the 13-hour journey, Springer was draped with wet cloths and treated with ointment. The catamaran traveled through the Inside Passage to Johnstone Strait, then to Dong Chong Bay, and Hanson Island, not far from OrcaLab. The previous day, high-tech hydrophones were installed in Dong Chong Bay by David Howitt and Michael Harris, to monitor acoustic interactions between Springer and wild whales. A net pen was in place, filled with wild Pacific salmon caught by local First Nations fishermen under a specially granted fishing permit. As promised, all 73 of the wild salmon caught by the Namgis were physically inspected for metal hooks.

When released into the net pen, Springer immediately began feeding on the salmon, spy-hopping (raising her head out of the water), breaching, pushing at the net, and calling out loudly to her relative orcas swimming nearby.

"She was vigorous and vocalizing and obviously interacting with the other whales. We were listening practically with our mouths hanging open (Saturday) night," said Spong. Lance Barrett-Lennard, Senior Marine Mammal Scientist with the Vancouver Aquarium, said that it was clear Springer knew she was home, and that "her calls were so loud they practically blew our earphones off."

== Life in community ==
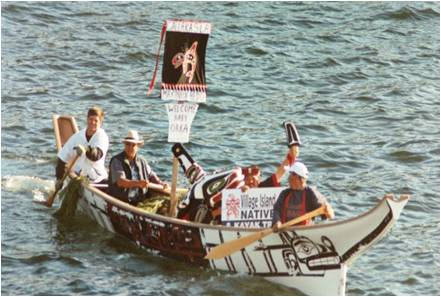
Namgis First Nations canoes welcome Springer home.

At 3:30 p.m. on July 14, Springer's keepers opened the gate on her net pen as other orcas went by, and Springer went "charging off". She swam straight towards the other orcas. First observations appeared to indicate that the operation was exceeding all expectations, that the experiment was a success.

However, the reaction of the wild whales to Springer's sudden appearance was initially to bunch together silently, seemingly in confusion. After a few minutes, they swam off, perhaps expecting Springer to follow. She appeared not to be able to keep up.

Temporary transmitter devices had been attached to Springer's back with suction cups, designed to fall off after a few days. Scientists and volunteers observed Springer visually. In the first days, she trailed the pod, keeping a distance of about half to three quarters of a mile.

Springer's tendency to interact with boats remained a problem. On July 16, she positioned herself near a small boat leaving it unable to move without hitting her.

Springer though would soon connect with wild whales. She began traveling consistently with the A4 pod (her mother's closest relatives), and distant cousins in the A5 pod. It was hoped that she would form a bond with a mature female who would act as a surrogate mother. The orca known as A51 or "Nodales," a 16-year-old female from the A5 Pod who had no calf of her own, appeared to take that role. In August, A51 was observed following Springer and guiding her away from boats, which Barrett-Lennard described as a sign of "reciprocalness in the relationship. It convinced me this is not just a case of A73 finding a placid female she's following around."

The bond between Springer and Nodales turned out to not be as strong as a normal mother-offspring bond in killer whales, however. Springer has since often been seen with Nawitti, a 12-year-old female from the A4 pod, and with Springer's great-aunt Yakat. On July 15, she was reportedly visiting Robson Bight, a favorite "rubbing beach" for local orcas. OrcaLab reported that she used the opportunity to rub off temporary suction cups researchers attached to her before her release. Monitors were pleased with the developments.

"It's a good start," said Barrett-Lennard.

John Nightingale, the director of the Vancouver Aquarium, stated on ABC World News Tonight With Peter Jennings, "I've been a fascinated spectator, watching these whales get used to each other and her integration into her larger family group."

Springer has been sighted each year with her pod. "Springer is in excellent condition," reported Spong in an OrcaLab press release. "There can now be no question about the success of the return project as it is clear that Springer has resumed living a normal social life among her kin and community."

KING 5 News reported, "It was a daring, dangerous and highly publicized effort, and now it appears it worked."

=== Motherhood ===
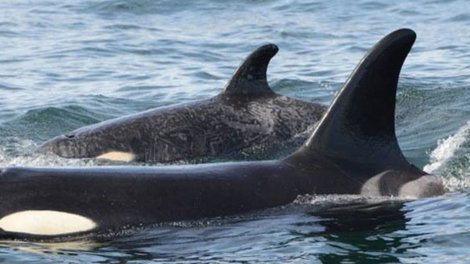
Springer being seen with her first calf, Spirit.

On July 4, 2013, Springer was sighted with a calf named A104, measuring about 2.5 meters long. "That leaves no doubt the young whale was accepted by and is thriving with her pod," said environmental reporter Gary Chittim of KING 5 News. The history of Springer's story, and her successful reintroduction into a wild pod, has set the precedent for the rescue and repatriation of another possible captive orca worldwide. This calf was later nicknamed Spirit.

Springer was first seen with her second calf, Storm, on June 6, 2017. It was estimated that she has been born about six months earlier.

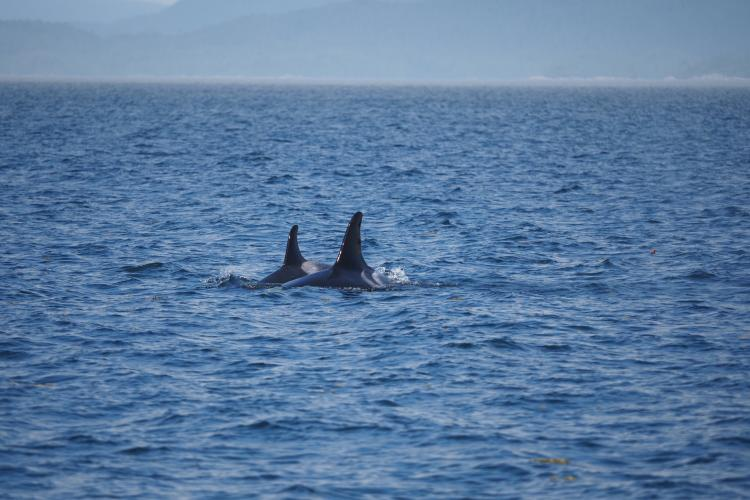
Springer with her younger calf Storm in 2022; 20 years after her rehabilitation, she and her two calves are looking well

Lance Barrett-Lennard commented: "Her rescue, relocation, reunification with relatives and transition to motherhood is an incredible story. I see it as testimony to both the resiliency of killer whales as a species and to the wonderful things we humans can do when we work together on behalf of — rather than against — nature." Since then, Springer and her calves have spent less and less time with the A24s and have eventually broken off to form their own matrilineal group known as the A73s in honor of their namesake who is also the leader of the new pod. During the summer, Springer can be seen with Spirit and Storm, who are also the only other members of her new pod. Observations by the photogrammetry project at Ocean Wise in 2021 confirmed that Springer is pregnant with her potential third confirmed offspring.

== See also ==
- Keiko (orca)
- Luna (orca)
- Namu (orca)
- List of individual cetaceans
