= Autoroute 30 =

Autoroute 30 may refer to:

- A30 autoroute, in France
- Quebec Autoroute 30, in Quebec, Canada

== See also ==
- A30 (disambiguation)#Roads
- List of highways numbered 30
