= A30 =

A30 or A-30 may refer to:

== Science ==
- A30 matriline, the name given to the most commonly seen orca matriline in British Columbia, Canada
- HLA-A30, a human serotype
- Leprosy and related conditions (ICD10 code "A30")

== Transportation ==
=== Air transportation ===
- Aero A.30, a Czech light bomber developed in the late 1920s
- A-30 Martin Baltimore, an American attack/bomber aircraft
- Scott Valley Airport (IATA location identifier "A30")

=== Automobiles ===
- Austin A30, a 1951–1956 British compact car
- Dongfeng Fengshen A30, a 2014–2019 Chinese subcompact sedan
- JAC Heyue A30, 2012–2019 Chinese subcompact sedan
- Aeolus A30, a Chinese saloon

=== Other ===
- Cruiser Mk VIII Challenger (A30), a British tank of World War II
- List of A30 roads

== Other uses ==
- Samsung Galaxy A30, smartphone released in 2019
- English Opening, code A30 (among others) in the Encyclopaedia of Chess Openings
