= U.S. Route 30S =

U.S. Route 30S may refer to:

- U.S. Route 30S (Oregon), now OR 201 and US 20/US 26 from Ontario to Caldwell
- U.S. Route 30S (Idaho–Utah–Wyoming), now I-84 and I-80 from Burley to Granger
- U.S. Route 30S (Nebraska–Iowa), now US 275, US 6, and I-29 from Fremont to Missouri Valley
- U.S. Route 30S (Ohio), now SR 309 from Delphos to Mansfield
