= Marineland of the Pacific =

Tourist attraction on the Palos Verdes Peninsula, California (1954–1987)

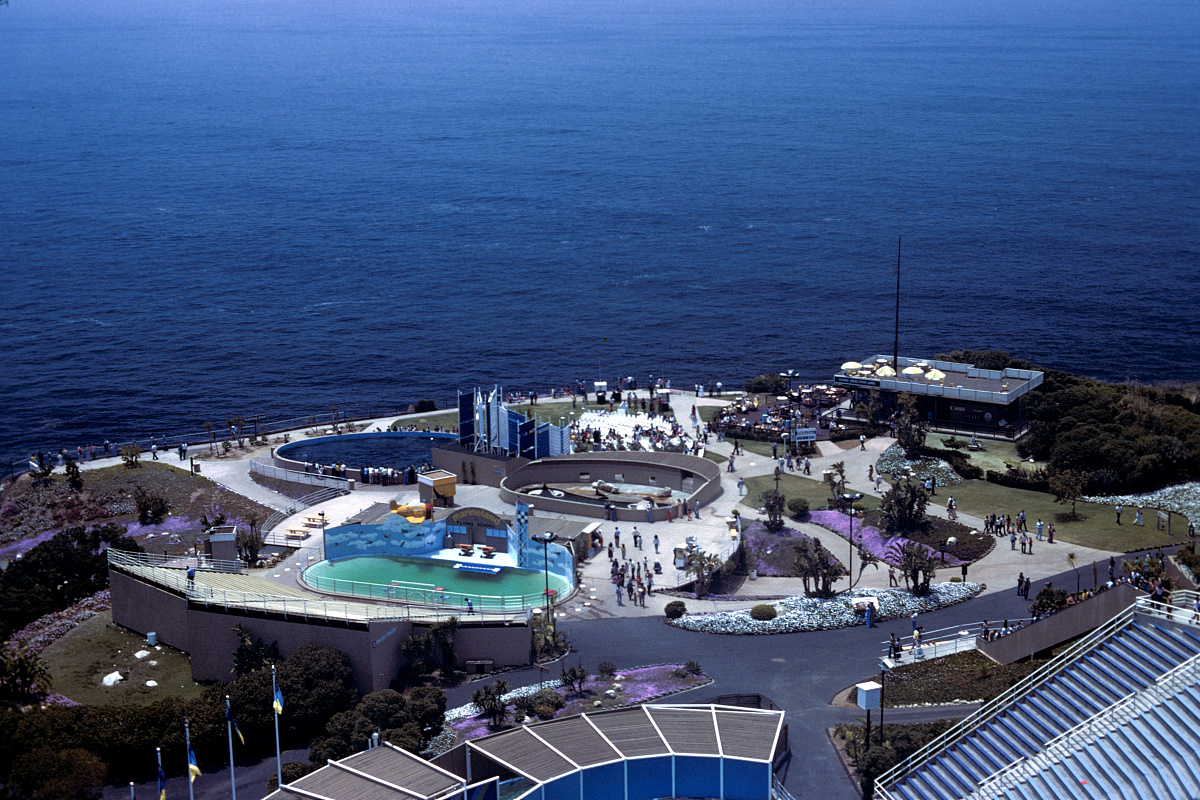
- Marineland of the Pacific
- Interactive map of Marineland of the Pacific
- 33.738°N 118.398°W
- Date opened: August 28, 1954; 72 years ago
- Date closed: February 11, 1987; 39 years ago
- Location: Los Angeles County, California, United States
- Website: marinelandofthepacific.org

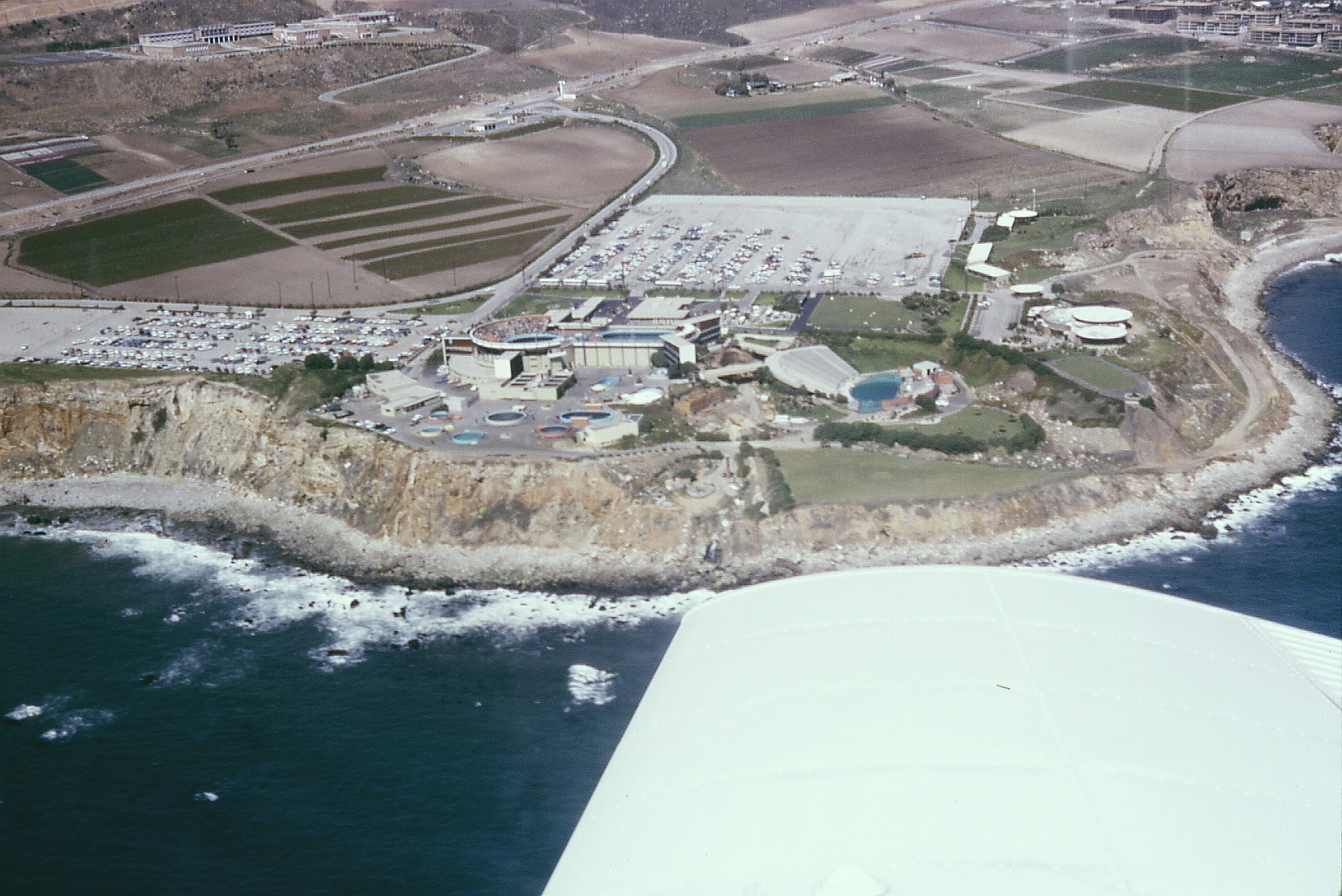
Marineland of the Pacific, June, 1965

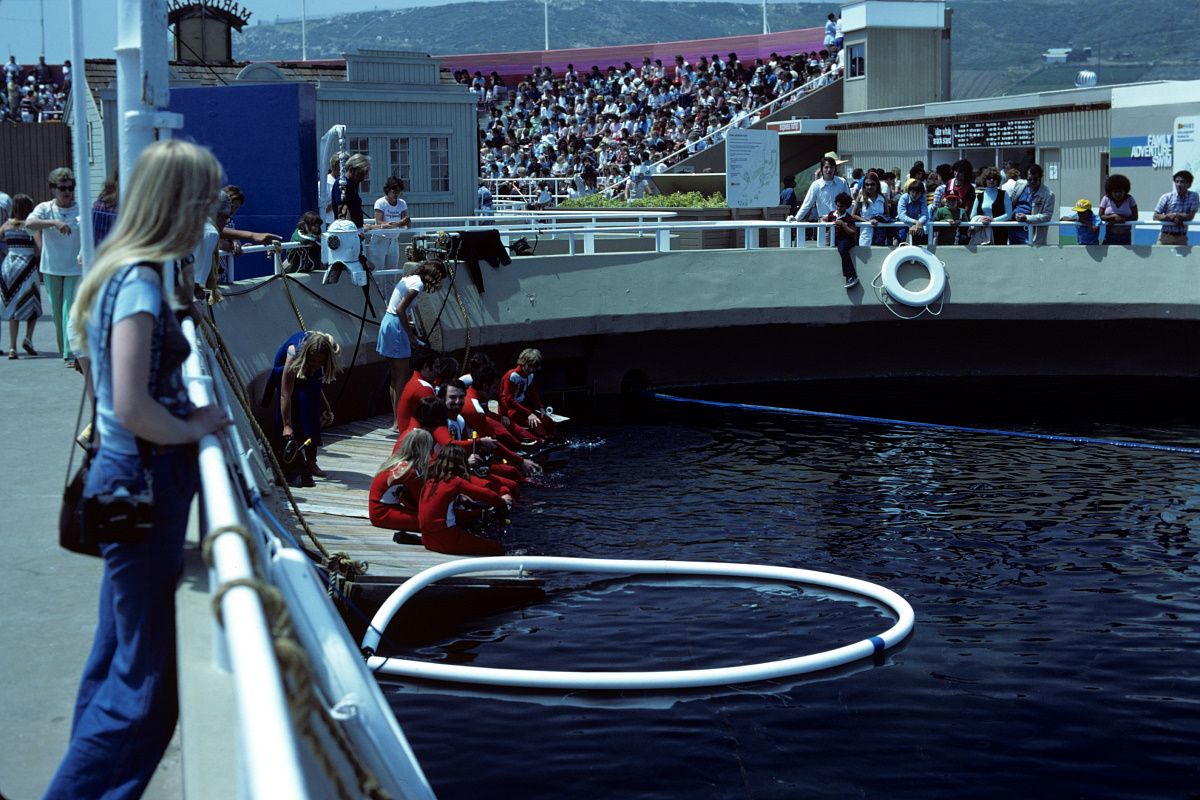
Family Adventure Swim

Marineland of the Pacific was a public oceanarium and tourist attraction located on the Palos Verdes Peninsula coast in Los Angeles County, California. Architect William Pereira designed the main structure. It was also known as Hanna-Barbera's Marineland during the late 1970s and early 1980s. Marineland operated from 1954 until 1987, when it was purchased by the owners of SeaWorld San Diego. The new owners moved the popular killer whales and other animals to their San Diego facility and abruptly closed Marineland.

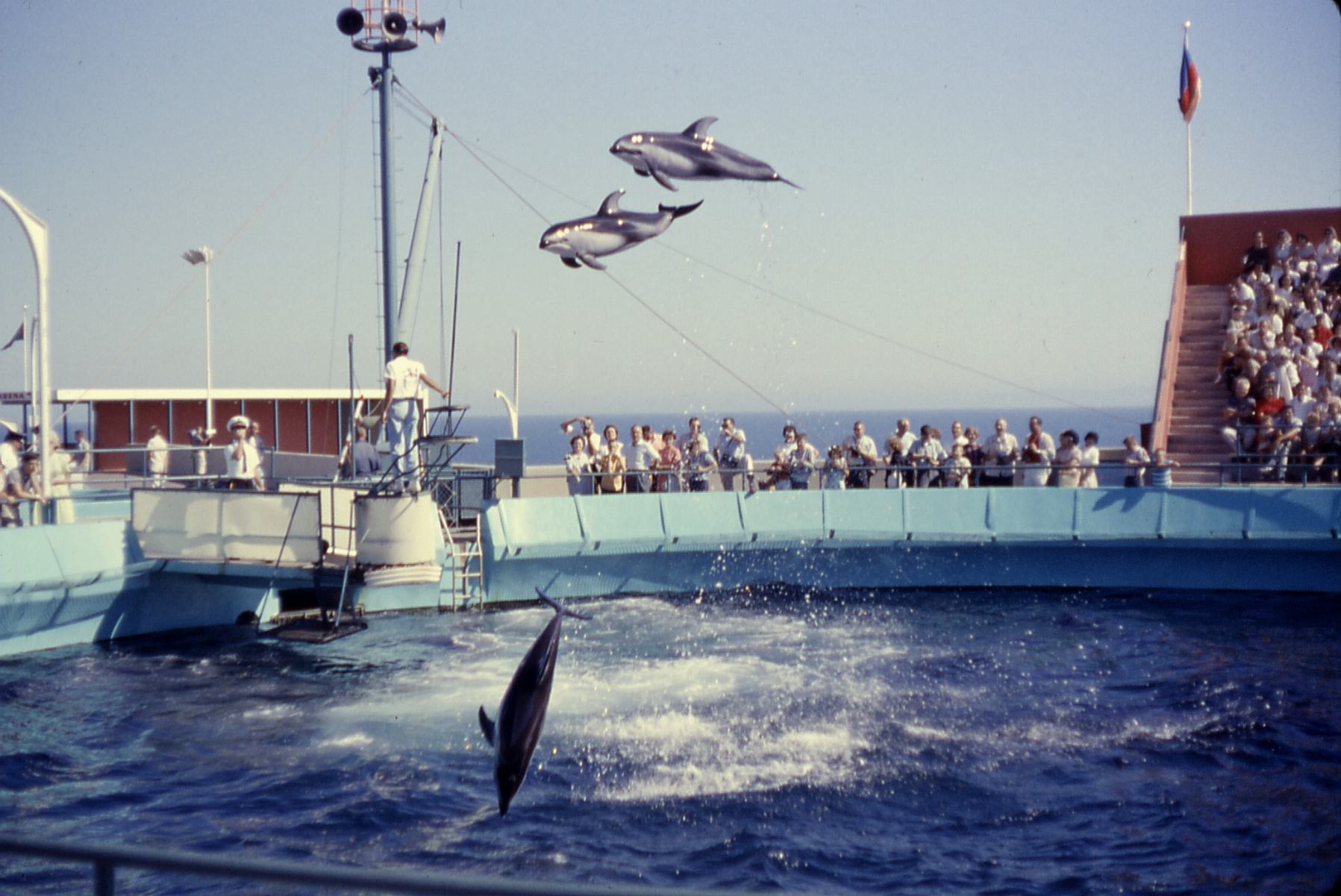
Dolphin Show, August, 1962

== History ==
=== Marineland ===
When it opened in 1954, one year before Disneyland, Marineland of the Pacific was the world's largest oceanarium. The park was designed by William Pereira, whose work, which included the Transamerica Pyramid, the Los Angeles International Airport, and Geisel Library helped define the architectural look of mid-20th century California.

Marineland was best known for its performing orcas. One tourist guide in 1974 stated, "Entertainment is the first purpose of this well-known Palos Verdes show place. Here's a rare opportunity to see a 'killer whale' leaping 18 feet out of the water to grab a fish from the teeth of its trainer, a dolphin jumping through a fire-ringed hoop, or a sea lion crooning a tune."

Marineland was home to Orky and Corky, two of the most famous orcas on exhibit at any oceanarium at the time. They were the second pair of orcas at the facility with these names; the original "Orky" and "Corky" did not live long in captivity and had no calves. Marineland was also home to the first pilot whales ("Bubbles" and "Bimbo") ever captured for display, as well as dolphins, sea lions, harbor seals, sharks, and a variety of other related sea creatures.

Other attractions included the Sky Tower, "a circular elevator ride 344 feet above the sea," and hourly boat tours of the coastline.

Marineland was also noteworthy for its Baja Reef concept, a first-of-its-kind swim-through aquarium featuring "many brightly colored fish." Visitors could enter the winding aquarium wearing a swim mask and snorkel and swim with the fish and sharks. The tour lasted seven minutes in 1979. Special admission tickets to this attraction cost $4 in 1985 US$5 (equivalent to $10 in 2025).

Circa 1979 there was a "new macaw show," strolling cartoon characters and a "marine animal care center" at the park.

=== Closing ===
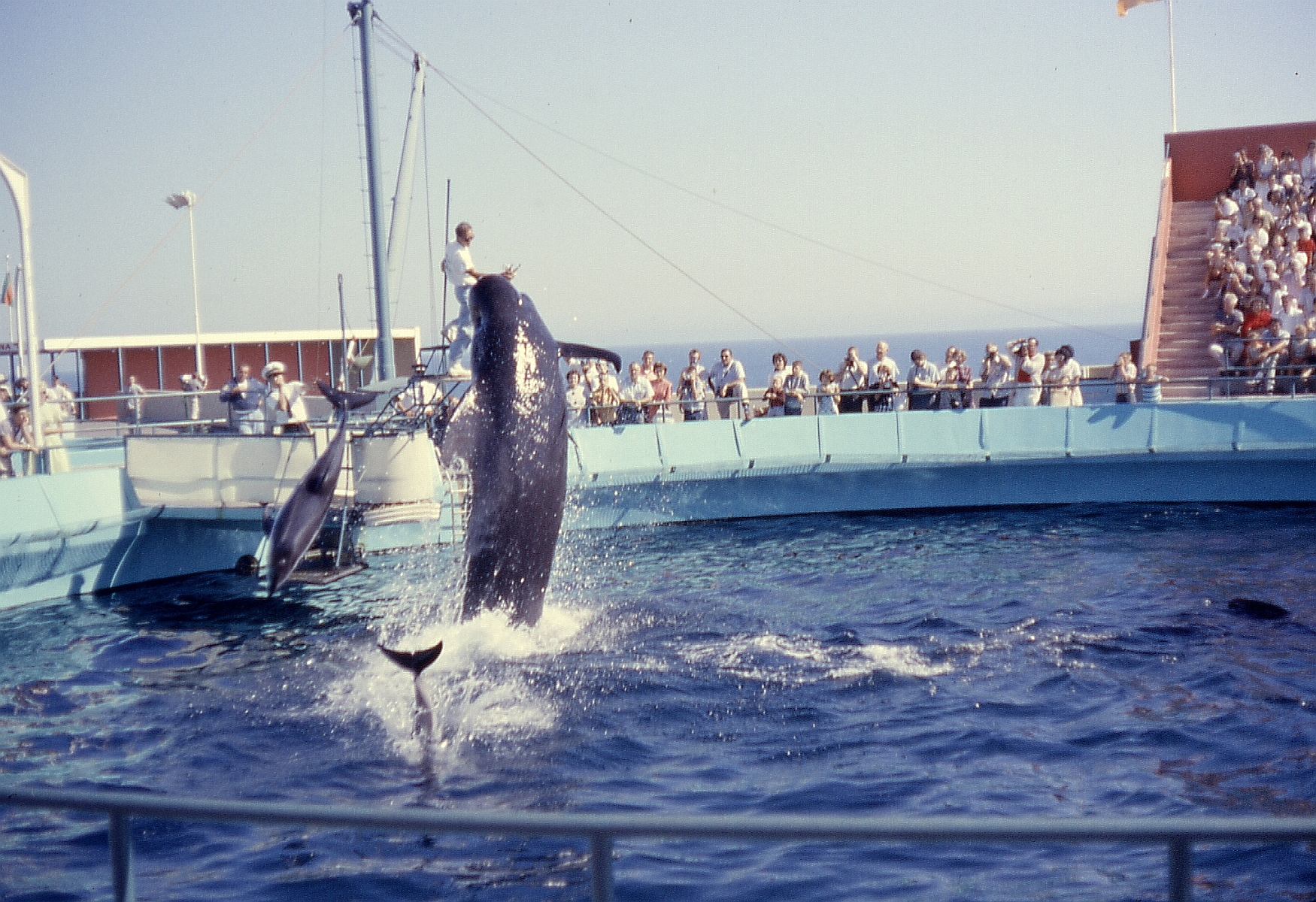
Pilot Whale & Dolphin Show, August, 1962

Harcourt Brace Jovanovich (the owner of the SeaWorld theme park group) purchased the facility in December 1986 from a Hong Kong developer. At the time, the park was run down and was just breaking even. Restoration plans were canceled on January 30, 1987, as Harcourt claimed that the park was in more disrepair than expected. Yearly losses of $2 million were projected unless improvements costing $25 million were undertaken.

Orky and Corky were moved to SeaWorld's San Diego park a few weeks after the purchase, supposedly for mating. Orky died in September 1988, while Corky remains alive, having turned 61 years of age in 2026. Rancho Palos Verdes city council passed an ordinance requiring Harcourt to maintain the park and allow public access to its beach. Although the company had promised to keep Marineland open, it was suddenly closed on February 11, 1987, six weeks after the sale was completed. Harcourt said it received bomb threats after announcing its change of heart, prompting it to lock the gates three weeks before the announced closing. The animals were trucked out in the middle of the night, and the new owners poured concrete into the drains so the park could not be reopened. Many local residents complained about the sudden closure. On March 1, 1987, the company announced that the park would stay closed.

=== Abandonment ===
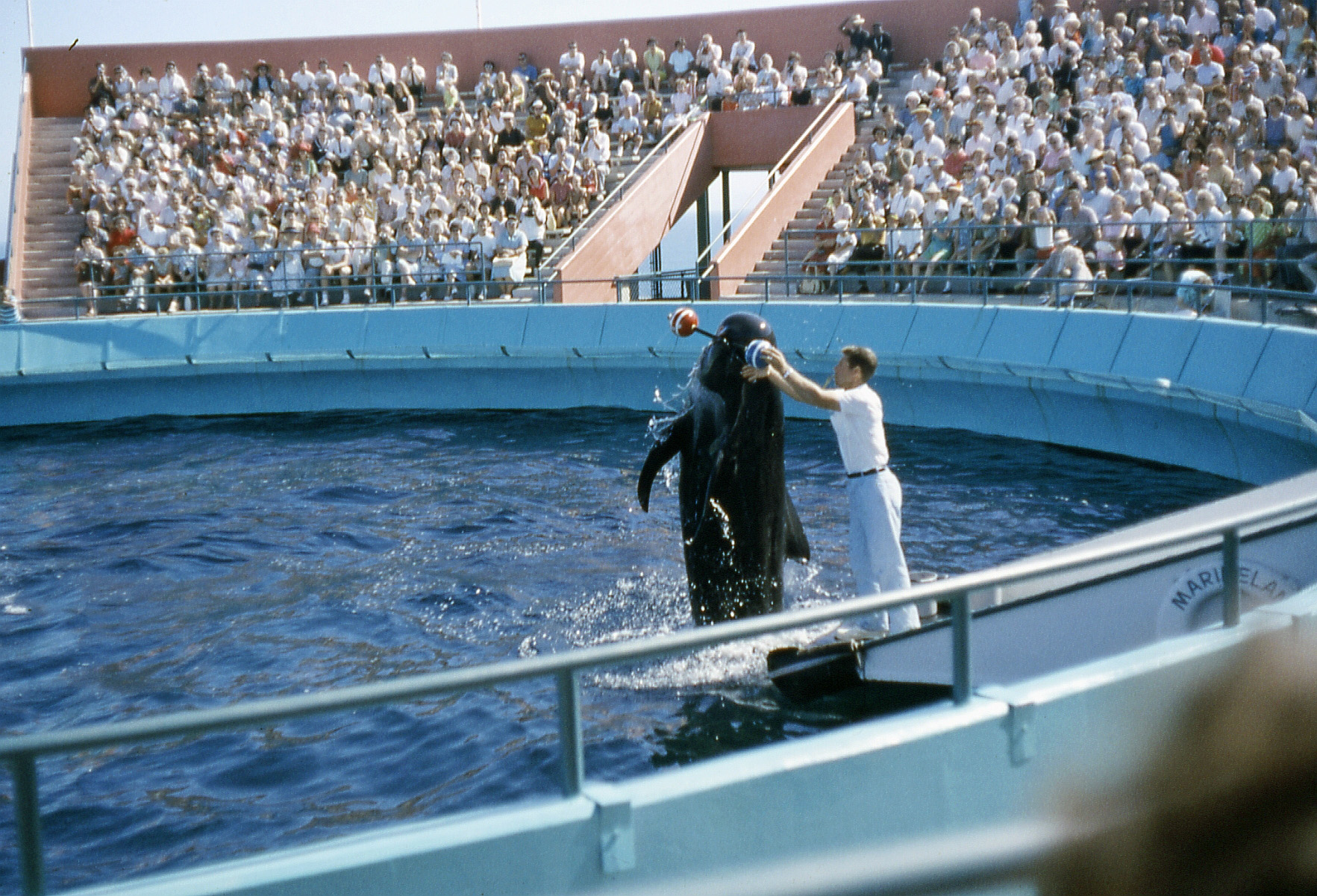
Bubbles the Pilot Whale, performing, August, 1962

Much of the infrastructure was left abandoned for nearly 20 years. Marineland's most visible landmark, the 414-foot (126 m) high tower, remained standing until 1995. The Marineland Restaurant continued operating through 2004 as the "Catalina Room" (Catalina Island was visible on a clear day). Several other structures remained through 2006.

=== Redevelopment ===
In 1995, developer York Long Point purchased 480 acres (1.9 km^{2}) of coastal land that included the Marineland location for $24 million.

After several false starts, development began in 2007 on a new $450 million resort, a project by Lowe Destination Development, which was planned to include a hotel, privately owned "casitas", and full spa and resort facilities. Originally projected to include an 18-hole golf course, the plan was changed to include only an "Executive Par 3" golf course on the resort property.

In early 2006, two small temporary sales offices replaced the abandoned gas station at the park entrance, and the large concrete sign along Palos Verdes Drive South (with a tower resembling a whale's tail) was altered to feature the logo and artist's impression of the resort. In July 2007, principal construction commenced, starting with the demolition of the remains of Marineland. The resort was completed in 2009. Today, the Terranea Resort occupies the site, but pays tribute to the history of the location, including Marineland.

The Point Vicente Interpretive Center, located a half-mile north on the same road, reopened in July 2006 after extensive remodeling, and it has a number of items related to Marineland in an exhibit, including a "Save Marineland" pin and various publications from the park. One of the original dolphin statues that formerly adorned the entrance to Marineland is also on display.

== Historical Society ==
The Marineland of the Pacific Historical Society was formed in 2003 "to provide information and access to historical information and images of the park to students, researchers, industry professionals, and interested parties".

== LA's Own Marineland Podcast ==
In 2022, writer and podcaster Tod Perry, launched a ten-hour podcast, "LA's Own Marineland" covering the park's 33-year history, abandonment and the lives of the animals after its closure. The show includes interviews with 20 people intimately involved with the park including management, marine mammal trainers, and guest services employees.

== Television, film and music ==
While still in operation, the park was prominently featured in several television shows, including two episodes of The Beverly Hillbillies, Mannix, The Munsters, The Partridge Family, Mutual of Omaha's Wild Kingdom, Hart to Hart, The Six Million Dollar Man, Emergency!, The Colbys, Wonder Woman, Sea Hunt, and later, Simon & Simon and an A Team episode a year before the park closed. Two episodes of The Chevy Show were taped there with Roy Rogers and Dale Evans featuring an "Aquarodeo" on May 1, 1960 and January 15, 1961. The fifth episode of the first season of The Invaders was filmed at Marineland. In an episode of the Lucy Show titled "Lucy at Marineland", Lucille Ball falls into a Marineland animal exhibit which was featured on the August 28, 1965 cover of TV Guide. In 1958, Dixieland jazz artist Red Nichols recorded a live album at Marineland. In an episode of Wonderbug, titled "Fish Story", Marineland was integral to the plot. Marineland was also briefly featured in the Charles Bronson film, The Mechanic, the Elvis Presley film, Live a Little, Love a Little, and the John Carradine film Blood of Dracula's Castle. The "Poor Little Kangaroo Rat" episode of Route 66 starring Martin Milner and George Maharis was filmed there with guest stars Ronny Howard, Leslie Nielsen, Maggie Pierce, and Joanne Linville which was in season 3 and episode 10 and originally aired on 11–23–62.

Since its closing, scenes for several feature films have been shot at the location, including Mermaids of Tiburon, the first three Pirates of the Caribbean films, Charlie's Angels, Hot Shots!, Inspector Gadget, Fun with Dick and Jane, Pearl Harbor, The Aviator, Hidalgo and Life As A House. For the latter, the suburban neighborhood exterior was entirely constructed from scratch on the site, as it was for Fun with Dick and Jane. Mel Gibson's trailer was parked at the bottom of the cliff for Lethal Weapon 2. Beastmaster 2 was filmed there as well.

Several TV shows have also used the site for their filming needs, including regular use by NBC's Fear Factor and one episode of Viper. The location was also used for MTV's Motel California.

== See also ==
- List of abandoned amusement parks
- List of former zoos and aquariums
