= Friends of the San Juans =

American environmental nonprofit organization

- Established: 1979
- Type: Nonprofit
- Location: Friday Harbor, Washington
- Executive Director: Eva Schulte
- Website: http://www.sanjuans.org

Friends of the San Juans ("Friends") is an environmental advocacy Nonprofit based in Friday Harbor, Washington. Founded in 1979, Friends is dedicated to preservation, both locally and internationally. Its mission is "Protecting and restoring the San Juan Islands and the Salish Sea for people and nature."

== Programs ==
Friends of the San Juans conducts programs in three categories.

=== Seas ===
Friends partners with other organizations with the goal of protecting the waterways of the Salish Sea. Friends is part of Stand Up to Oil and Power Past Coal , two regional coalitions working together to hold the "Thin Green Line" that blocks the fossil fuel industry from using the Salish Sea coast as a super-highway. Friends also organizes events in order to raise awareness of the threats of unfettered shipping. In addition to this, the organization petitions government to add critical species to the endangered and threatened species lists and utilizes legal work and raises awareness to achieve protection for the Southern Resident Orca. In the past, Friends led an international effort to add the San Juan Islands to the International Maritime Organization list of Particularly Sensitive Sea Areas.

=== Shorelines ===
Friends intends to protect shorelines by working in three main categories: by applying policy and law and participating in planning processes to ensure that the best available science is used in decision making, by working with property owners and land managers to help them make sound decisions, and by doing research on shoreline habitat. Shoreline conservation work done by Friends also includes partnering with contractors in order to remove bulkheads and old, creosote laden docks, as well as add appropriately sized gravel to protect beaches and provide spawning area for forage fish.

=== Land ===
Friends advocates for local policies like a Critical Areas Ordinance that apply scientific information to protect upland habitats. Friends also files legal challenges to restore wetlands from unpermitted development and advocates to zone farmlands for long-term agricultural use. Friends also works with the San Juan Islands Conservation District, Islands Energy and OPALCO on the Cool School Challenge, a program which engages students in reducing energy and carbon dioxide emissions school-wide. Through Inter Tribal Canoe Journey stopovers, reef net restoration, Coast Salish Mini-University, and community canoe building, Friends intends to improve the public’s understanding of Native peoples.
