= Northern resident orcas =

Orca community in the North Pacific

Northern resident orcas, also known as northern resident killer whales (NRKW), are one of four separate, non-interbreeding communities of the exclusively fish-eating ecotype of orca in the northeast portion of the North Pacific Ocean. They live primarily off the coast of British Columbia (BC), Canada, and also travel to southeastern Alaska and northern Washington state in the United States. The northern resident population consists of three clans (A, G, R) that consists of several pods with one or more matrilines within each pod. The northern residents are genetically distinct from the southern resident orcas and their calls are also quite distinct.

Population Estimates
Date	A Clan	G Clan	R Clan	Total	Reference
2020	172	96	57	325	
2021	175	98	59	332	
2022	177	103	61	341	

== Social structure ==
Like the Southern residents, the Northern residents live in groups of matrilines. A typical Northern resident matriline group consists of an elder female, her offspring, and the offspring of her daughters. Both males and female orcas remain within their natal matriline for life. Matrilines have a tendency to split apart over time. Pods consists of related matrilines that tend to travel, forage, socialize, and rest together. Each pod has a unique dialect of acoustic calls. Pods that share one or more certain calls belong to a common clan.

=== Behaviours ===
In the summer months the Northern residents can often be observed swimming close to shores of Johnstone Strait and positioning their stomachs to rub themselves on beach pebbles. More than 90% of the Northern resident population observed in Johnstone Strait visit these rubbing beaches. They emit certain and specific calls more frequently while engaging in this activity. Although it is not clear why they engage in this activity, beach rubbing has been identified as an important activity to the culture of the entire Northern resident community. This behaviour was originally thought to be unique to the Northern resident community; however, the Southern Alaska resident killer whales have also been observed beach rubbing.

== Location ==
The Northern residents have been seen as far south as Grays Harbor, Washington and as far north as Glacier Bay, Alaska. From spring until mid-summer, the Northern residents are commonly found in Chatham Sound near the BC–Alaska ocean border and in Caamaño Sound between Haida Gwaii and the BC mainland. From June until October, they are commonly found in Johnstone Strait. The habitat of the Northern residents overlaps with the Southern residents; however, the two types of orcas have never been observed together.
Members of A clan have been the most commonly sighted whales off northeastern Vancouver Island, whereas G clan is most commonly sighted off the west coast of Vancouver Island, and members of R clan are most commonly sighted in the northern parts of the community's range.

== Conservation efforts ==
In 2008, the Canadian Ministry of Oceans and Fisheries designated the waters of Johnstone Strait and southeastern Queen Charlotte Strait as critical habitat and legally protected under a Critical Habitat Order. In 2018, the western part of the Dixon Entrance along the north coast of Graham Island from Langara Island to Rose Spit was also identified as critical habitat for the Northern residents.

== List of pods ==
This is a list of northern resident orca pods that live off the coast of British Columbia, Canada, as of March 2013.

Pod	Matrilines	Individuals	Notable members	Notes
A Clan
A1	3	20	Stubbs (A1)*, Nicola (A2)*, Tsitika (A30)*	See main article
A4	3	15	Yakat (A11)*, Kelsy (A24), Siwiti (A48)*, Springer (A73)	See main article
A5	3	10	Top Notch (A5)*, Eve (A9)*, Sharky (A25)*, Corky (A16)	See main article
B1	1	6	Hooker (B1)*	Used to have a large proportion of males
C1	2	16	Namu (C1)*	Its two matrilines most often travel separately
D1	2	12	Wrap Fin (D1)*	Its two matrilines are most often encountered together
H1	1	5		Has been encountered infrequently
I1	1	18		Has been encountered very infrequently
I2	1	3		Has been encountered very infrequently
I18	2	24		
G Clan
G1	4	34		
G12	2	16		
I11	2	26		
I31	2	10		
R Clan
R1	4	38		Spans a record five generations
W1	1	4		Was quickly found to be a dying matriline due to the only female and matriarch, W3 ""Nebohannah", being post-reproductive. Died out in 2018 when the last member, Nebohannah herself, was declared deceased

Asterisk indicates deceased member.
