= U.S. Route 30N =

U.S. Route 30N may refer to:

- U.S. Route 30N (Oregon–Idaho), now OR 201, US 95 Spur, and US 95 from Huntington to Fruitland
- U.S. Route 30N (Idaho–Wyoming), now US 30 from Burley to Granger
- U.S. Route 30N (Ohio), now US 30 from Delphos to Mansfield
