= List of highways numbered 30A =

The following highways are numbered 30A:

== India ==
- National Highway 30A (India)

== United States ==
- U.S. Route 30A (former)
- New England Interstate Route 30A (former)
- Florida State Road 30A
  - County Road 30A (Walton County, Florida)
- New York State Route 30A
