= Scott Valley Airport =

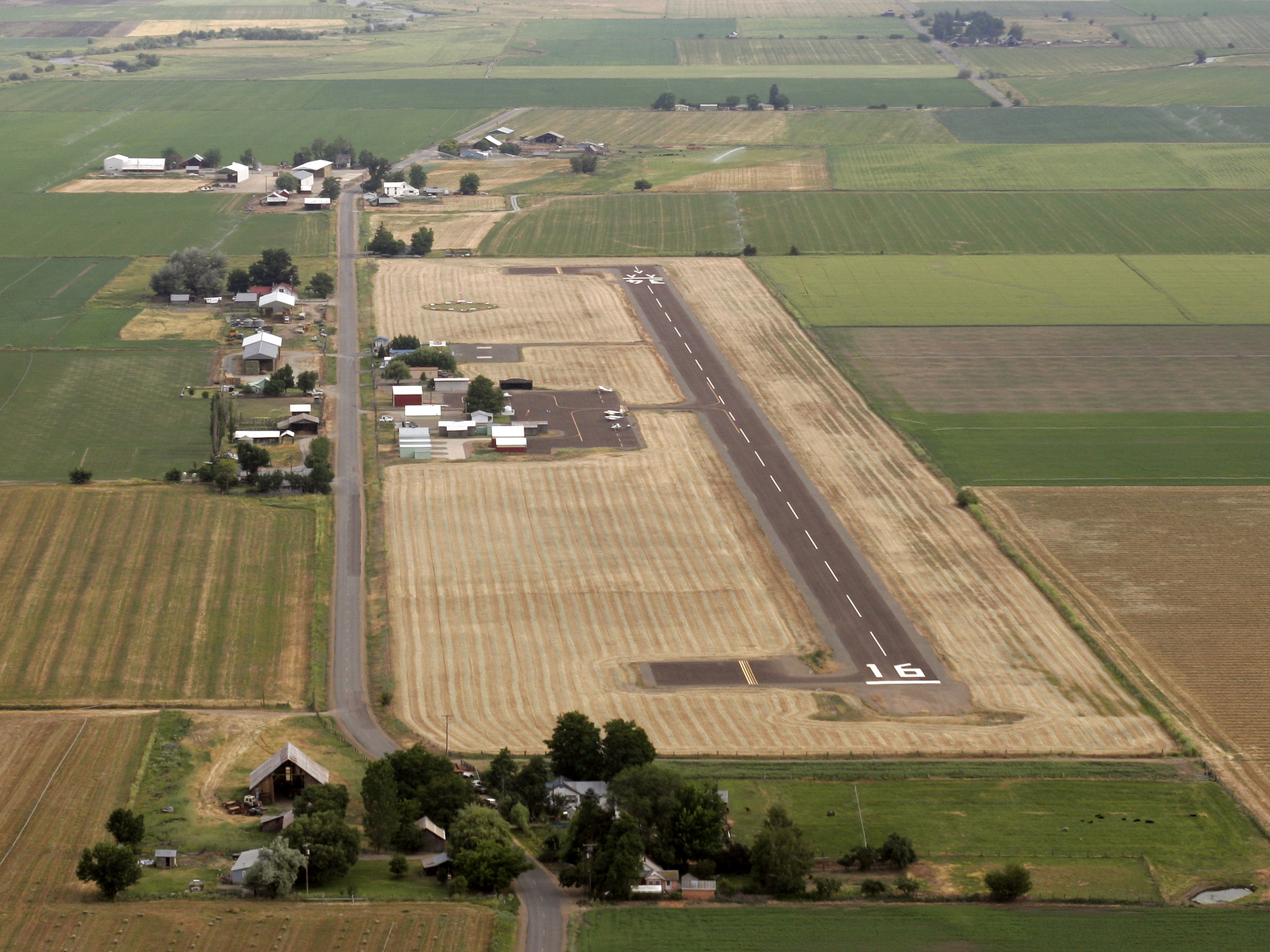
- IATA: none; ICAO: none; FAA LID: A30

Summary
- Airport type: Public
- Operator: County of Siskiyou
- Location: Fort Jones, California
- Elevation AMSL: 2,728 ft / 831.5 m
- Coordinates: 41°33′30″N 122°51′19″W
- Interactive map of Scott Valley Airport

Runways
Direction	Length		Surface
Direction	ft	m	Surface
16/34	3,700	1,128	Asphalt

Scott Valley Airport (FAA LID: A30), formerly CA06, is a public airport located three miles (4.8 km) south of the central business district (CBD) of Fort Jones, a city in Siskiyou County, California, USA. The airport covers 53 acres and has one runway.
