= List of A30 roads =

This is a list of roads designated A30. Road entries are sorted by alphabetical order of country.

- A30 motorway (Canada), a road in Quebec connecting Salaberry-de-Valleyfield and Bécancour
- A30 road (England), a road connecting London and Lands End, Cornwall
- A30 motorway (France), a road connecting A31 near Metz and N52 near Longwy, France
- A30 motorway (Netherlands), a road connecting the A12 motorway near Ede with the A1 near Barneveld
- A30 road (Isle of Man), a road connecting St. John's and Patrick
- A30 motorway (Spain), a road connecting Albacete with Murcia and the Autopista AP-7, Spain
- A30 road (Sri Lanka), a road connecting Vavuniya and Parayanalankulama
- A 30 motorway (Germany), a road connecting Hannover and the Dutch A1 motorway
- G1503 Shanghai Ring Expressway, an orbital road in Shanghai, China, formerly designated as A30
