= Corky (orca) =

Captive female orca (born c.1965)

Corky II
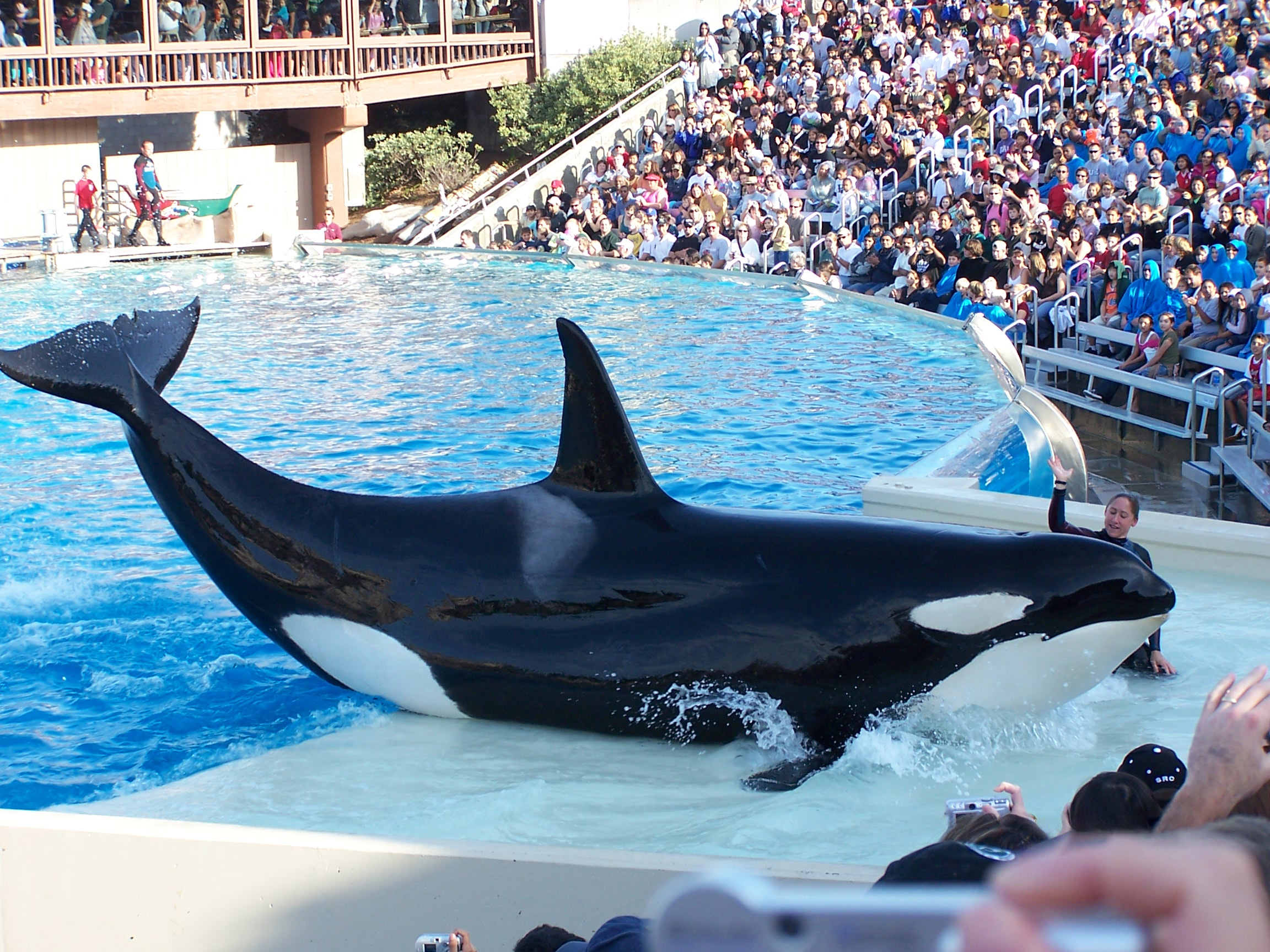
- Corky II on the slide out during the Shamu Show at SeaWorld San Diego.
- Species: Orca (Orcinus orca)
- Sex: Female
- Born: c. 1965 (age 60–61)
- Years active: 1969–present
- Known for: Oldest captive female orca as of 2024
- Parent: Stripe (mother) (1948–2000)
- Mate: Orky II (cousin) (1962–1988)
- Offspring: Calf (son) (28 February 1977 – 15 March 1977); Spooky (son) (31 October 1978 – 10 November 1978); Kiva (daughter) (18 June 1982 – 3 August 1982); Calf (daughter) (22 July 1985 – 20 September 1985); (none survived to adulthood)
- Weight: 3,855.535 kg (8,500 lb)
- Height: 19 ft 8 in (5.99 m)
- Named after: Female Orca named Corky (1965–1970)

Corky II (born c. 1965), often referred to as just Corky, is a female captive orca from the A5 Pod of northern resident orcas. At approximately the age of four, Corky was captured from Pender Harbour off the coast of British Columbia on 11 December 1969. She has lived at SeaWorld San Diego in San Diego, California since 21 January 1987. As of 2024, she is the oldest and longest kept captive orca. SeaWorld San Diego celebrates her birthday on January 1 every year.

== Early life ==
Corky was born in 1965. Her mother, designated A23, nicknamed "Stripe", was born in 1948 and died in 2000. Corky, along with a young unnamed male and a young female later named Patches, were sold to Marineland of the Pacific, in Palos Verdes, California. Corky is the only surviving captive orca from the Pacific Northwest. As a member of the northern resident orca community, she has been given the alphanumeric code A16.

== Captivity ==
Corky II received her name after the park's original orca, Corky I (1965 – 5 December 1970), who died on 5 December 1970 at the age of five. Corky I was also born in 1965 like Corky II and she was also a female orca like Corky II. Corky was kept with a male named Orky II who was her cousin, also caught in Pender Harbour the year before her own capture. The pair remained together at the park for the next 17 years and mated. Corky became the first orca to produce offspring in captivity and on 28 February 1977, she gave birth to the first captive calf. However, the infant male failed to nurse and died of pneumonia after just eleven days on 15 March 1977. Corky and Orky had six more calves but none survived, the oldest, named Kiva (22 June 1982 – 3 August 1982), a female, lived for just 46 days. Corky and Orky also appeared in the 1977 film Tentacles. Corky suffered three miscarriages on 1 April 1980, 27 July 1986 and in August 1987. After that she never became pregnant again.

In 1987, Corky was sold to SeaWorld and was moved with Orky II to the park in San Diego, California, United States on 21 January 1987. There, she mated again with Orky II, and she suffered a miscarriage in August 1987. Orky II later bred with other females, named Kandu V (1974 – 21 August 1989) and Kenau (1975 – 6 August 1991) at SeaWorld San Diego and with them he sired two female calves, Orkid (born 23 September 1988) and Kayla (26 November 1988 – 28 January 2019). Corky never became pregnant again. On 26 September 1988, Orky II died three days after the birth of his first daughter, Orkid who was born on 23 September 1988 to Kandu V. He was the oldest and largest captive orca at the time of his death.

In January 2025, Corky celebrated her 60th birthday at SeaWorld San Diego and lives with seven other orcas.

== Incident ==
In 1989, a dominant female orca, Kandu V, charged at Corky but ruptured an artery in her own jaw during the fight. After a 45-minute hemorrhage, Kandu V died. Her 11-month-old daughter, Orkid, was placed with Corky, who acted as a surrogate mother.

== Controversy ==
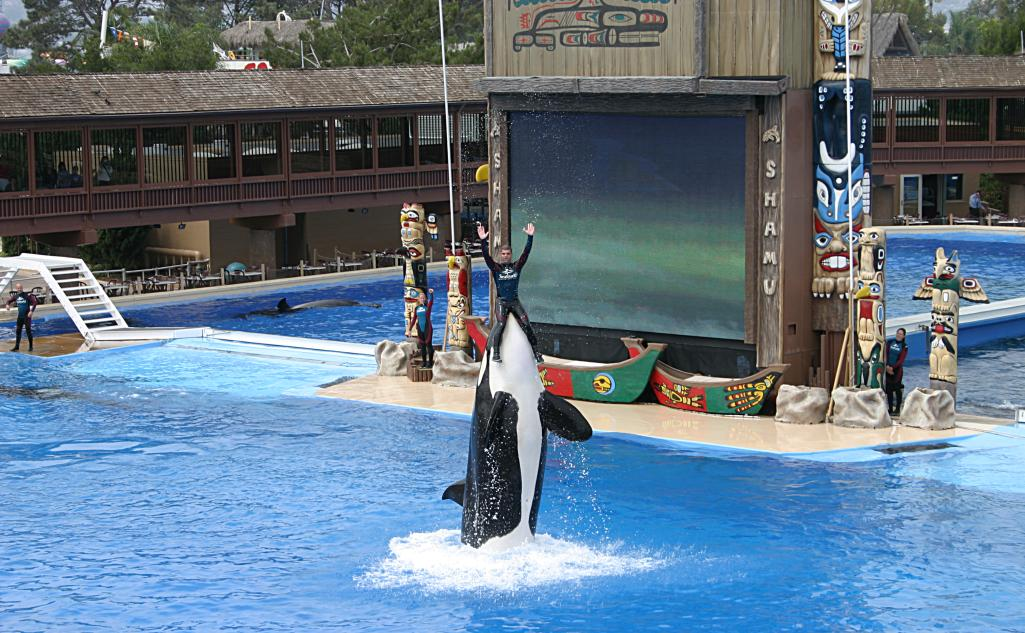
Corky 2 performing "The Shamu Adventure" on July 5, 2004. The stage at Shamu Stadium has since been redesigned to accommodate the new "Orca Encounter" show.

Corky is the subject of various campaigns by animal rights activists and organizations, including PETA, demanding her retirement and release. In 2017, a Canadian orca research organization created a banner from more than 17,000 pieces of artwork that stretched 1.5 miles as a means to promote her freedom. A 40 acre sea sanctuary located off Hanson Island in British Columbia has been proposed for her relocation, but SeaWorld remains resistant, arguing Corky would not survive. Support for her release surged after Lolita died before her release, including people writing letters to SeaWorld.

== See also ==
- List of individual cetaceans
