= A1 Pod =

Pod of killer whales

A1 pod is a killer whale family in British Columbia. It currently consists of 3 matrilines and 20 members and is the most commonly encountered pod in the Northern resident killer whale community. This community is found in coastal waters ranging from mid-Vancouver Island north to Haida Gwaii, although A1 pod has yet to be seen this far north. The community is made up of three clans known as A, G and R clans, each possessing a distinctive dialect and consisting of several related pods. A1 pod belongs to the biggest clan, A clan.

== Early research and naming ==
A1 pod was the first pod identified by Michael Bigg and Graeme Ellis in 1972. Bigg’s pioneering photo-identification system actually originates from the regular encounter of a female whale with a distinctively torn dorsal fin. The whale, named Stubbs, was re-sighted in 1973, which gave Bigg the idea of photographing the dorsal fin of each killer whale he and Ellis encountered. Thus, Stubbs was aptly given the alphanumeric code A1, which also became the name of her pod. Another female orca belonging to Stubbs’s pod also had a very recognizable dorsal fin with a big nick on the lower edge and was named A2, but became better known as Nicola. During the summer of 1973, A1 pod spent a considerable amount of time with A4 and A5 pod, which led researchers to believe they belonged to the same group. When it became clear to researchers that these whales spent a significant amount of time apart from A1 pod and had just happened to be travelling together when first identified, they were named A4 pod and A5 pod. Moreover, researchers discovered that A1 pod generally split during winter months into three subpods or matrilines: A1 subpod, A12 subpod and A2 subpod.

== Evolution of the pod ==
For reasons unknown to researchers, the three A1 subpods have steadily been spending increasing time apart from each other since the 1980s. While in the 1970s, the three matrilines were together two thirds of the time, this figure dropped to one third of the time in the 1980s and to one fifth of the time in the 1990s. Today, the A1 matrilines are typically encountered separately and the coherence of A1 pod as a group is sometimes debated. Between the 1970s and 1990s, A1 pod didn't grow much in size: it consisted of 13 members in 1973 and of 15 members in 1993. However, since the mid-1990s, A1 pod has been enjoying a steady growth, mostly due to the high number of reproductive females and the low number of sudden deaths that have hit its members. As of 2013, A1 pod consists of 20 members.

== A1 matrilines ==
=== A36 matriline ===
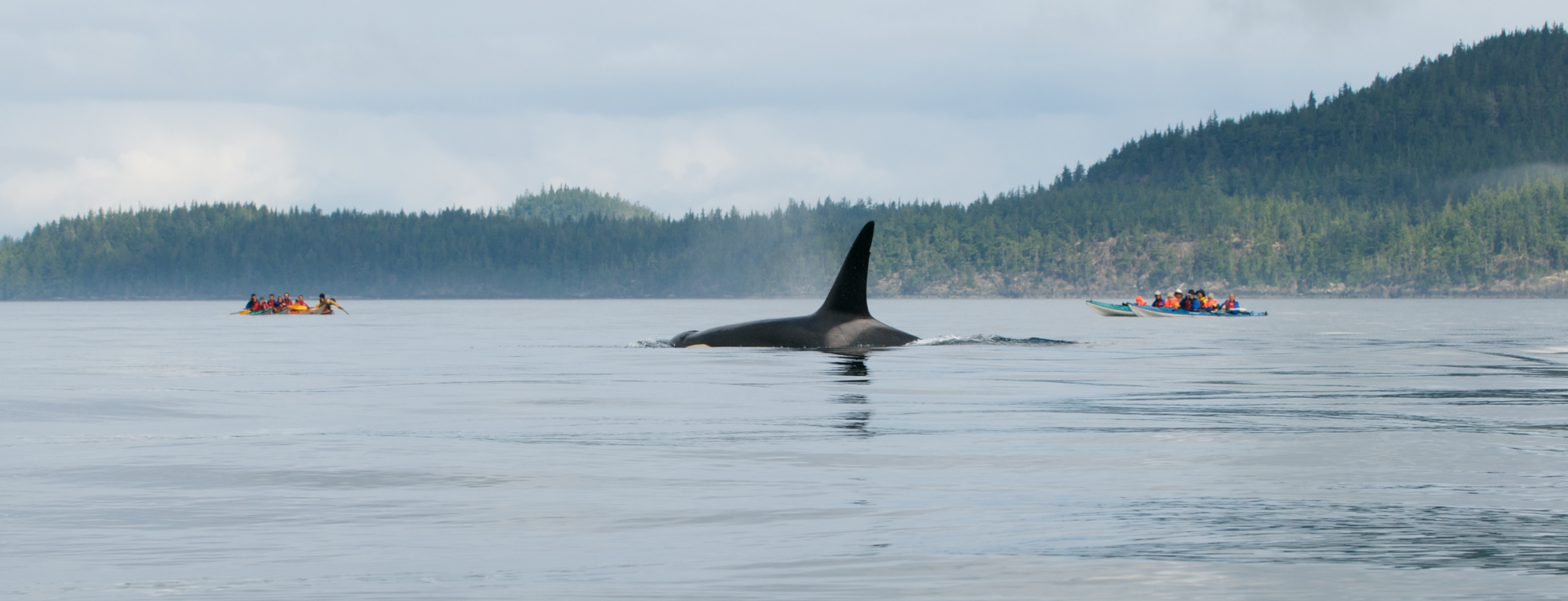
Kaikash (A46) swimming in Johnstone Strait.

A1 matriline was renamed A36 matriline following the death of Stubbs (A1) in 1974, which meant that her suspected daughter Sophia (A36) would take on the role of matriarch. Sophia was also thought to be the sister of a large bull named Hardy (A20) (sometimes called Sturdy). As Sophia neared the end of her reproductive life in the early 1990s, it became clear to researchers that the A36 matriline would eventually die out, as Sophia’s only daughter, A44 died in 1975 at the age of 2. Sophia was the mother of three bulls, Cracroft (A32), Plumper (A37) and Kaikash (A46). One good example of the stability of killer whale society and especially of the bonds that unite brothers was when Sophia died in 1997. Instead of drifting apart, the three brothers stayed together and until the deaths of the two eldest brothers, were never seen travelling separately. As the A36s solely consisted of bulls, they were a very recognizable group and are sometimes called “The Brothers” or “The Guys”. On November 8, 2004, the A36s were involved in a very unusual incident recorded by a camera of Orcalab. They were seen harassing a Dall’s porpoise, which resident killer whales never feed on. Although the attack appeared violent, there is no evidence that the A36s actually ate the porpoise.

Deceased individuals include:

- Cracroft (A32). Estimated to have been born in 1964, Cracroft was one of the oldest males in the Northern Resident community. Thanks to genetic testing it was determined that Cracroft was the father of Skuna (I42), member of I11 pod and born in 1983. Cracroft was very easy to identify, as the tip of his dorsal fin was continuously rounded while it is normally pointed. It seems that Cracroft died during the spring of 2010, as the rest of the group was encountered without him in June 2010.
- Plumper (A37). Born in 1977, Plumper was one of the first A1 pod members whose date of birth was positively known. Plumper was spotted by an unmanned research drone in August 2014 off of the Johnstone Strait, looking thin and unhealthy. Researchers suggest he may have died.
- Kaikash (A46). Kaikash was a bull born in 1982. Although Sophia was only about 35 years old when she gave birth to Kaikash, she never produced another calf. Kaikash's death in 2017 caused his matriline to go extinct.

Other deceased individuals include: Stubbs (A1; 1927–1974), Sophia (A36; 1947–1997), A44 (1973–1975), Hardy (A20; 1953–1992).

=== A12 matriline ===
The A12 matriline was named after its matriarch A12. Better known as Scimitar, she was given this name because her dorsal fin has a shape similar to that of a sword. The A12 matriline has grown substantially since it was first encountered and today spans 3 generations. Current individuals:

- Simoom (A34). Simoom is an adult female born in 1975. She had her first calf, Echo, at the age of 15 and since then has been a very prolific mother, producing five other offspring, one of whom is deceased. All of Simoom’s offspring were born in late October or November. In 1997, while her calf Misty (A62) was nursing, Simoom was hit by a speedboat. She survived the accident and all her wounds appear to have healed well. Simoom became a grandmother in 2005 when her Misty gave birth to Dusky (A83). As Simoom’s family grew, it began spending some time away from the rest of the group, even though they still spend most of their time together.
- Echo (A55). Echo is an adult male. He was born in 1990 and is Simoom’s first calf. Usually, researchers have to wait until adolescence to determine the gender of an orca, but thanks to genetic testing, it was determined earlier that he is a male. Echo’s dorsal fin started sprouting (i.e. growing) in 2007 and it now resembles that of a bull.
- Misty (A62). Misty is an adult female born to Simoom in 1993. She became a mother at the early age of 12 in 2005 when she gave birth to Dusky (A83). Misty’s gender was also determined by genetic testing.
- Eclipse (A67). Eclipse is an adult female born to Simoom in 1996. As with her brothers and sisters, Eclipse’s gender was also determined by genetic testing.
- Hope (A80). Hope is Simoom’s male calf and was born in 2004.
- Dusky (A83). Dusky is Misty (A62)’s first calf and with his/her birth in 2005, the A12 matriline became one of the few killer whale families spanning four generations. His/her sex has not been determined yet.
- Fantome A91. A91 is Misty's second calf and he was born in 2009.
- Rainy A96. Simoom's latest calf, A96 was born in 2010. His/her sex has not been determined yet.

Deceased individuals include:

- Scimitar (A12). Scimitar was an adult female estimated to have been born in 1941. At about 70 years of age, she was one of the oldest females in the Pacific Northwest region. She was also one of the very few orcas that was already mature when first identified in 1973. She had two sons, Pulteney (A31) and Nimpkish (A33), both of whom are dead, and one daughter, Simoom (A34).
- Pulteney (A31). Pulteney was a large bull and it is thought that he was Scimitar (A12)’s first offspring. He was estimated to have been born in 1951 and died in 1997. Pulteney was his mother’s constant companion and seldom left her side. After his sister Simoom was hit by a speedboat, Pulteney appeared in distress and almost stranded himself. He died a few months later, although his death may well have been due to his old age.
- Nimpkish (A33). Nimpkish was Scimitar’s second son and was estimated to have been born in 1971. Nimpkish often took the role of “uncle” to his nephew Echo and was affectionately nicknamed “Uncle 33”. Following his brother Pulteney’s death, Nimpkish began spending nearly all of his time next to his mother. He was also known for his large dorsal fin which many considered to be “perfect” because it didn't bear any nicks or scratches. Nimpkish died during the spring of 2009 at the age of 38.
- Stormy (A74). Stormy was Simoom (A34)’s fourth calf and was born in 2000. His/her gender was never determined. It died in 2006.
- Sunday (A92). Sunday was Eclipse's first calf and like its cousin A91, was born in 2009. His/her gender was never determined.

== The pod today ==
A1 Pod is one of the healthiest resident pods, having had few early deaths and a high birth rate. The three matrilines are quite approachable and are usually not afraid of boats. Like in the 1970s, A1 pod is the most commonly encountered pod in the Northern Resident community, mostly due to its preference for the Johnstone Strait region during the summer and fall. Even at the peak of summer gatherings, the three matrilines are rarely seen all together. However, each group does spend more time with other A1 matrilines than with other pods. During the summer months, they spend a substantial amount of time with A4 and A5 pod who are their closest relatives. A1 pod is also one of the few pods whose winter grounds are at least partially known. They can be seen in the winter in the northern Johnstone Strait region and spend an important part of their time in the Broughton Archipelago. When Nimpkish (A33) died in the summer of 2009, Scimitar was seen alone for the first time. She was then spotted in the company of her daughter’s family as well as with the A30s. During the fall, she was seen with the A36s rather than with her daughter. Researchers such as Paul Spong believe she may have done so because of the presence of large bulls which she was used to travelling with.

== See also ==
- A4 Pod
- A5 Pod
- List of Northern Resident Killer Whale Pods

== Books ==
- Ford, John K.B.; Ellis, Graeme M.; & Balcomb, Kenneth C. (2000). Killer Whales (2nd ed.). UBC Press. ISBN 0-7748-0800-4.
- Hoyt, Erich. (1990). Orca: The Whale Called Killer (3rd ed.). London: Robert Hale Limited. ISBN 0-920656-25-0.
- Morton, Alexandra. (2002). Listening To Whales : What the Orcas Have Taught Us. Ballantine Books. ISBN 0-345-44288-1.
