= A4 pod =

Killer whale family in British Columbia

A4 pod is a killer whale family in British Columbia. As of March 2013, it consists of three matrilines and 15 members and is the family of Springer, the first orca to be successfully reintroduced to the wild after being handled by humans. A4 pod is part of the northern resident orcas found in coastal waters ranging from mid-Vancouver Island to southeastern Alaska up through Haida Gwaii (formerly the Queen Charlotte Islands). The community is made up of three clans known as A, G and R clans, each possessing a distinctive dialect and consisting of several related pods. A4 pod belongs to the biggest clan, A clan.

== Early research and naming ==
A4 pod was one of the first pods photo-identified by Michael Bigg and Graeme Ellis in 1972. At that time, it was called “The Six” and was first thought to be part of A pod. When it became clear to researchers that these whales spent a significant amount of time apart from the rest of the group and had just happened to be travelling together when first identified, it was named A4 pod and A pod became A1 pod, A4 pod and A5 pod. Also, when the study began, it was assumed that orca pods were harems led by mature males. Thus, A4 pod was named after a large bull called A4 while it should have been named A10 pod after the matriarch A10.

== Evolution of the pod ==
When A4 pod was first encountered, it travelled as one group led by the matriarch A10. In 1983, she and her youngest calf, A47, were shot at the rubbing beaches in Robson Bight. A whale watching vessel reported A47 bleeding profusely while being supported by its mother. Both of the whales died that winter. A10's probable daughters Yakat (A11) and Kelsey (A24) were left with the role of matriarchs while still being young adults. In 1986, the pod began splitting into two subpods, A11, led by Yakat and A24, led by Kelsey, but continued to spend most of their time together. Starting in the early 2000s, Yakat's oldest daughter Skagit (A35) and her offspring began spending time apart from the rest of the group, thus creating a third matriline, A35. After the death of Yakat, matriline A56 was formed with Nahwitti as matriarch. The A35s and the A56s are still most often seen together.

Seventeen members of the A4 pod have died since the study begin, more than any other pod in the northern resident community. Kelsey (A24) lost her first five calves, as well as her two younger siblings. Yakat (A11) lost two offspring, one of her grandchildren and one of her great-grandchildren. In 2001, Kelsey's daughter Sutlej (A45) died, leaving two-year-old daughter Springer (A73) orphaned. In 2002, Springer was found alone and emaciated in Puget Sound, several hundreds of miles away from her family's home range. After being taken to Johnstone Strait and brought back to health, she was successfully reintroduced to wild whales before settling in with her grandaunt Yakat's matriline. In 2006, Yakat's son Skeena (A13) sustained an injury to the top of his dorsal fin and her great-grandchild Canoona (A82) was hit by a boat propeller. The whale then went missing and is now considered dead.

Having four reproductive females, A4 pod can be recognized by its large proportion of young calves and juveniles. They are much warier of boats than other pods and often prefer to stay far away from them despite being more tolerant than in the 1980s. They are one of the most commonly encountered groups of orcas, mostly due to their preference for the Johnstone Strait region during the summer and fall and are often seen with other Northern Resident pods, especially A1 and A5 pods which appear to be very closely related to one another. A4 pod is the only resident pod to frequently feed on pink salmon; other residents prefer the larger, fatter Chinook salmon.

In January 2013, 55-year-old matriarch Yakat (A11) was found dead on a beach near Ketchikan, Alaska. A full necropsy was performed to try to determine the cause of death.

== Current status ==
As of March 2013, A4 pod consists of three matrilines and 15 members. The three matrilines are:

The A24 matriline, which consists of Kelsey's daughter Schooner (A64), born in 1995, her son Magin (A71), born in 1999, Toba (A78), born in 2003 and Mystery (A94), born in 2009, as well as Schooner's first offspring, Kanish (A89).

The A35 matriline, which consists of Yakat's daughter Skagit (A35), born in 1974, her daughter Kiltick (A52), born in 1987, her daughter Sunny (A70), born in 1999, Roller, born in 2003, Pine (A90), born in 2008 and Kiltick's own calf Nalau (A81), born in 2004.

The A56 matriline, which consists of Yakat's daughter Nahwitti (A56), born in 1990, her cousin once removed Springer (A73), born around 2000, Springer's offspring, Spirit (A104), born in 2013, her newest offspring Storm (A116), born in 2017 and Nahwitti's own offspring, Kalect (A97), born in 2010. The matriline was named after Yakat (A11) until her death in January 2013.

	Name	Sex	Birth	Death	Mother	Offspring
A4		Male	1952	1984		
A10		Female	1941	1983		A47; presumed: Yakat, Kelsey
A11	Yakat	Female	1958	January 2013	presumed: A10	Skagit, Skeena, Nahwitti
A13	Skeena	Male	1978	2010	Yakat	
A19			1973	1973		
A24	Kelsey	Female	1967	2013	presumed: A10	Sutlej, Schooner, Magin, Toba, Mystery
A35	Skagit	Female	1974		Yakat	Kiltik, Sunny, Roller, Pine
A41			1981	1981		
A45	Sutlej	Female	1983	2001	Kelsey	Springer
A47			1983	1983	A10	
A48	Siwiti		1983	1996		
A49			1985	1986		
A52	Kiltik	Female	1987		Skagit	
A53	Scylla		1988	1992		
A56	Nahwitti	Female	1990		Yakat	Kalect
A58	Surf		1992	1993		
A59	Racey		1992	2006		
A64	Schooner	Female	1995		Kelsey	Kanish
A65			1996	1996		
A68			1997	1997		
A70	Sunny	Female	1999		Skagit	
A71	Magin	Male	1999		Kelsey	
A73	Springer	Female	2000		Sutlej	Spirit, Storm
A76			2002	2002		
A77	Roller		2003		Skagit	
A78	Toba		2003			
A81	Nalau		2004		Kiltik	
A82	Canoona		2004	2006		
A89	Kanish				Schooner	
A90	Pine		2008		Skagit	
A94	Mystery		2009			
A97	Kalect		2010		Nahwitti	
A100	Kwatna		2011			
A104	Spirit		Winter 2012–13		Springer	
A116	Storm	Female	2017		Springer	

== See also ==
- Springer
- A1 Pod
- A5 Pod
- List of Northern Resident Killer Whale Pods

== Books ==
- Ford, John K.B.; Ellis, Graeme M.; & Balcomb, Kenneth C. (2000). Killer Whales (2nd ed.). UBC Press. ISBN 0-7748-0800-4.
- Hoyt, Erich. (1990). Orca: The Whale Called Killer (3rd ed.). London: Robert Hale Limited. ISBN 0-920656-25-0.
- Morton, Alexandra. (2002). Listening To Whales : What the Orcas Have Taught Us. Ballantine Books. ISBN 0-345-44288-1.
