= A5 pod =

Group of orcas found in British Columbia, Canada

A5 Pod is a name given to a group of orcas (Orcinus orca) found off the coast of British Columbia, Canada. It is part of the northern resident orcas population—a name given to the fish-eating orcas found in coastal waters ranging from mid-Vancouver Island in British Columbia up through Haida Gwaii and into the southeastern portions of Alaska. The orcas of the Northern Resident community are divided into vocally distinctive clans known as the A clan, the G clan, and the R clan. Members of the A5 Pod belong to the A clan. As of 2024, A5 Pod consisted of ~15 members.

Over time, studies showed that these congregations of orcas did not make up a complete, distinctive pod. Rather, they were matrilines—a mother and her offspring up to the fourth generation. However, matrilines within a pod frequently socialize with one another, more so than with orcas from another pod—thus still making up a distinct community, and so perpetuating the use of the pod naming.

== Naming ==
When studies first began, it was assumed all orcas traveling together were part of the same pod. Initially, males were also thought to lead harems of females and their young. Some pods were therefore named after a distinctive male while others were named after other distinctive individuals.

The A5 Pod itself was named after a male orca, A5, also known as Top Notch. He was part of the A9 matriline, of which his mother, A9 (also known as Scar or Eve) was the leader. The A5 pod is currently made up of three matrilines. The line of A9 has died out with her sons, A5 (Top Notch) and A26 (Foster). She had no surviving daughters to carry on her line, although the matriarch of another family, A8 (Licka) was suspected to be her daughter. A9 washed up on a beach in Johnstone Strait in November 1990, her stomach containing 5 litres of fish bones representing 13 different species. Other whales in the pod include A23 (Stripe) and A60 (Fife).

== Capture ==
As a whole, A5 Pod was captured several times during the 1970s, in order to take young orcas into aquariums around the world. Almost an entire generation of orcas was taken from different families of the A5 pod.

A female, Corky, is the only orca from these captures still alive, and the only surviving member of those from the northern resident community taken into captivity. She remains under the care of SeaWorld San Diego in California at 59 years old. From studies of this population, it is known that her mother was A23 (Stripe). A23 died in 2000, at about 53 years of age. Corky had a brother, A27 (Okisollo), also deceased. Her living family currently consists of a younger sister, A43 (Ripple), a niece, A69 (Midsummer), and a younger brother, A60 (Fife).

Other members of the A5 Pod included A14 (Saddle). She was easily recognized by her unique saddle patch—a marking behind the dorsal fin. A14's daughter, A25 (Sharky) was also known for having a pointed dorsal fin. Saddle died in 1991, around the age of 44, while Sharky died unexpectedly at the age of around 26, in 1997. Sharky's death was a surprise, because her age group has the lowest mortality rate of all age groups.

== Losses ==
The A5 Pod has suffered many losses and deaths over the years. Besides losing a generation of whales to captivity, one young whale, A57 (Kelkpa) was found dead on December 16, 1996, in a bay in British Columbia. Her death was due to erysipelas; she was the first orca of the Northern Resident population whose cause of death was determined. In 1973, a young whale was hit by a ferry from British Columbia. Two older whales supported the young one and helped it to breathe. The whale was sighted 15 days later, with the other two still holding it up, then was never seen again. This was presumed by the researchers to be the young whale A21, also an A5 Pod whale.

Also, on July 27, 2003, a young male, A60 (Fife), Corky's brother, was injured by what was assumed to be a boat propeller. By 2004, the injury was well-healed, but left scarring all along his right side. In late 2012, A5 pod was sighted without Havannah (A28), as she was not encountered by the summer of 2013, she is now considered dead by researchers. In 2011, Nodales (A51) and her young calf, A98, both went missing. Her matriline now consists of her brother Surge, (A61) and her older calf Cordero (A86), and Cordero's 2019 calf, Twilight (A121).

== Current population ==
Currently, the A5 Pod consists of 3 matrilines and 17 whales (including one missing and probably dead). The three matrilines are:

- The A8 Matriline, which consists of A42 (Sonora), born in 1980, and her children A66 (Surf), born in 1996, A79 (Current), born in 2004 and A88 (Cameleon), born in 2008.
- The A23 Matriline, which consists of siblings A43 (Ripple), born 1981 and A60 (Fife), born 1992, A43's daughter A69 (Midsummer), born 1996 who gave birth to A96 (Fern) in 2009, and A109 (Eliot), and Ne'nakw in 2021.
- The A51 Matriline, which consists of A61 (Surge), born in 1994, and his niece A86 (Cordero) born in 2005, and Cordero's calf, A121 (Twilight).

Every whale currently alive in A5 Pod was born during the study, and therefore all of their lineage is known positively.

== See also ==
- A1 Pod
- A4 Pod
- List of northern resident orca pods
