= Nimpkish =

Nimpkish is an anglicization of the name of the 'Namgis subgroup of the Kwakwaka'wakw peoples. It can refer to:

- MV Nimpkish, a 1973 BC Ferry
- the Nimpkish River
  - Lower Nimpkish Provincial Park, a part in the river's lower basin
- Nimpkish Lake, a lake in the river's basin
  - Nimpkish Lake Provincial Park, a provincial park on the southwest shores of that lake
- Nimpkish First Nation is an old transliteration of the band government now known as the Namgis First Nation
- Nimpkish Indian Reserve No. 2, an Indian reserve governed by the ‘Namgis First Nation
- Nimpkish Bank, a bank or shoal offshore from the mouth of the Nimpkish River
- Nimpkish Camp, a former logging community at the southeast end of Nimpkish Lake
- Nimpkish Heights, a locality near the mouth of the Nimpkish River
