= Cormorant Channel Marine Provincial Park =

Provincial park in British Columbia, Canada

- IUCN category II (national park)
- Location within Vancouver Island Location within British Columbia
- Interactive map of Cormorant Channel Marine Provincial Park
- Location: Rupert Land District, British Columbia, Canada
- Nearest city: Port McNeill, BC
- Coordinates: 50°34′58″N 126°51′22″W
- Area: 245 ha (610 acres)
- Established: September 16, 1992
- Governing body: BC Parks

Cormorant Channel Marine Provincial Park is a provincial park in British Columbia, Canada, located in the Pearse Islands, a small archipelago to the east of Cormorant Island and the Village of Alert Bay at the western end of Johnstone Strait.

== See also ==
- List of British Columbia provincial parks
