= Jack Pickup =

Canadian physician

- Born: Harold Jackson Pickup; 17 January 1919; Cardston, Alberta
- Died: 11 February 1996 (age 77)
- Occupations: General practitioner Pilot
- Known for: Early air medical services provider
- Spouse: Lila Pickup

Harold Jackson Pickup (17 January 1919 – 11 February 1996) was a physician responsible for providing health care to remote communities in British Columbia while based out of the village of Alert Bay. He was sometimes known as the "Flying Doctor of British Columbia".

== Early years and education ==
Harold Jackson "Jack" Pickup was born on 17 January 1919 to William Samuel Pickup and Dorothy Mary Aylward. He had one sister, Zoe. Two years after he was born, the Pickup family relocated to Fort William, Ontario. Pickup graduated from high school early, at age 16.

Jack Pickup attended Queen's University in Kingston, Ontario and graduated in 1942 as a surgeon and general practitioner. Though he intended to serve as a physician in the Royal Canadian Navy, Pickup was instead relegated to working at the tuberculosis sanatorium in Fort William for the remainder of the Second World War. Pickup briefly worked in Ontario, and had a practice in Dryden.

== Career ==
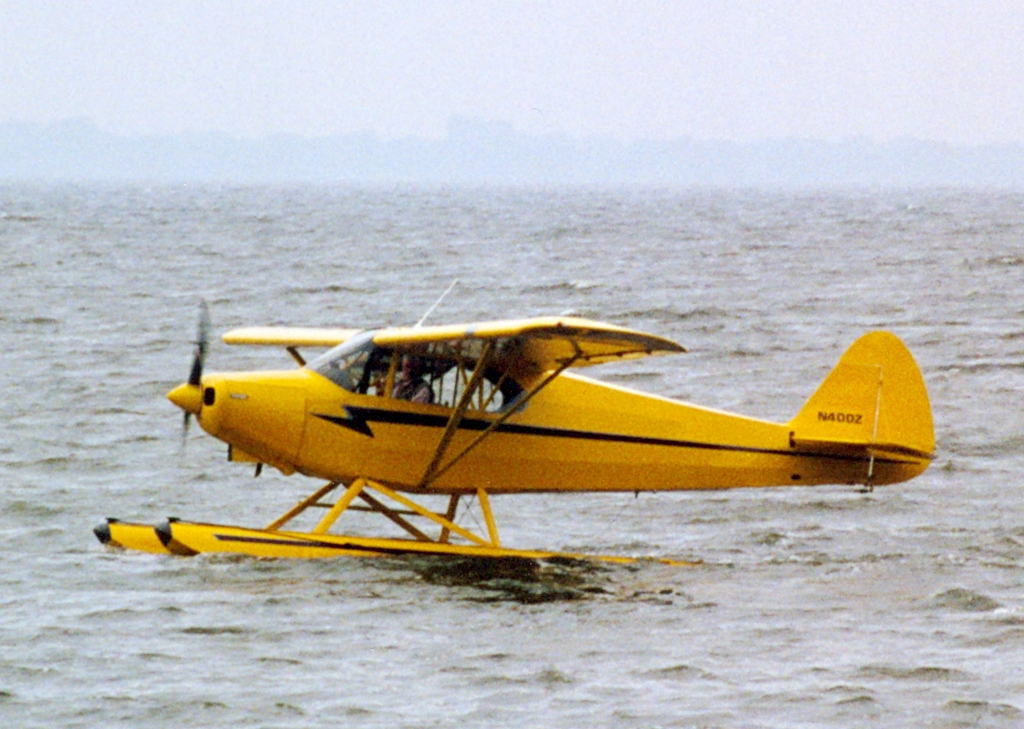
Piper PA-12 Super Cruiser

The village of Alert Bay purchased a decommissioned military hospital formerly operated by the Royal Canadian Air Force in Port Hardy and transported it to Cormorant Island by barge in 1947, creating St. George's Hospital. Advertisements circulated across Canada for a doctor willing to service not just the community but more than a thousand isolated communities across Vancouver Island and mainland British Columbia as well, an area of over 10,000 km^{2}. Jack Pickup became very interested in the job in 1949 despite never having been to Alert Bay or even knowing where it was. Two days after Pickup arrived in the village to consider the opportunity, the doctor who had until then been caring for the community disappeared, prompting Pickup to take the position for a five-year term.

Upon arrival in the region, Pickup encountered difficulties transporting injured patients to the hospital in Alert Bay, as far as Kelsey Bay (60 miles (97 km) from Alert Bay) to the south and Bella Bella (100 miles (160 km) from Alert Bay) to the north. With sea travel proving too prolonged and land travel too difficult, Pickup made the decision to take flying lessons and become a pilot in order to better tend to his patients. His lessons were taken over the course of a three-week leave of absence and in September 1950 he received his pilot's licence flying a Luscombe 8A at Vancouver International Airport. With little time left to acquire a plane, Pickup looked at three available floatplanes before purchasing a Piper PA-12 Super Cruiser (CF-EFC) for $3,500; he had also considered a Stinson Reliant and a Republic RC-3 Seabee. After purchasing the aircraft he flew the 1,500 miles (2,400 km) to Kenora to receive his floatplane endorsement, and then flew back to British Columbia and returned to Alert Bay. The trip to and from Ontario took Pickup twenty hours across five days and required nine stops on lakes and rivers for refuelling. On the return flight Pickup used the Yellowhead Pass between Jasper and Tête Jaune Cache to traverse the Rocky Mountains, following the Thompson and Fraser Rivers to the ocean and often flying lower than the granite cliffs on either side of the region's valleys. Along the way, Pickup used telephones to check in and allow others to monitor his progress westward, as there was no radio aboard his plane.

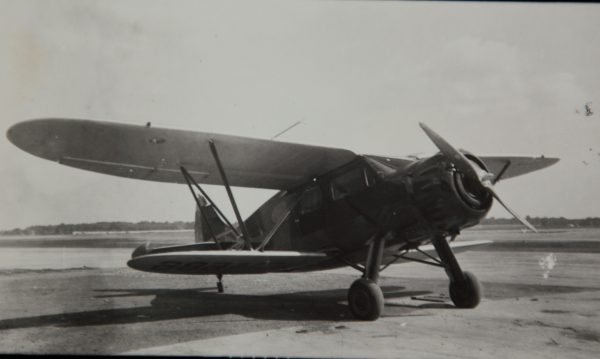
Waco ZQC-6, similar to the Waco AQC-6 used by Pickup

Pickup continued to use the Piper for three years, and its red and yellow colour scheme made it the best-known airplane in the region. Though he eventually installed a radio in its cockpit, the only signal he was usually able to pick up was from RCAF Port Hardy (now the Port Hardy Airport). Pickup would later remark that the Piper was his favourite to fly. Pickup became embroiled in a protracted two-year battle to convince Revenue Canada to accept money spent on maintaining and fuelling his aircraft as legitimate tax expenses; ultimately, he became the only doctor in Canada to be allowed to expense 80% of his air travel costs. In 1953, after 300 hours of flight, he sold the plane and upgraded to a Waco AQC-6 (CF-CCW) biplane for $6,000. Pickup took the Waco on test flights between Vancouver and Nanaimo before returning with it to Alert Bay, where it would continue to service the communities tended to serve Pickup for 27 years under the name "Big Red". The Waco sank after striking a submerged log on take-off in 1958, but was soon raised and Pickup adopted a sideslipping technique for landing. As the most established pilot in the community, Pickup helped Alert Bay Air Services train their first pilots and acquire their first aircraft - a floatplane variant of the Cessna 170 - in 1958. Among other things, the Alert Bay Air Services provided medevac support for injured or killed loggers in remote areas in the region, and continued to do so after being amalgamated into Air BC along with a number of other aircraft companies in 1980. Pickup also became a part-owner of Altair, a short-lived aircraft company in Pitt Meadows, where he had his own aircraft serviced. In 1970, he purchased a Republic RC-3 Seabee while Bird Red was undergoing repairs and used it in place of the Waco for four years.

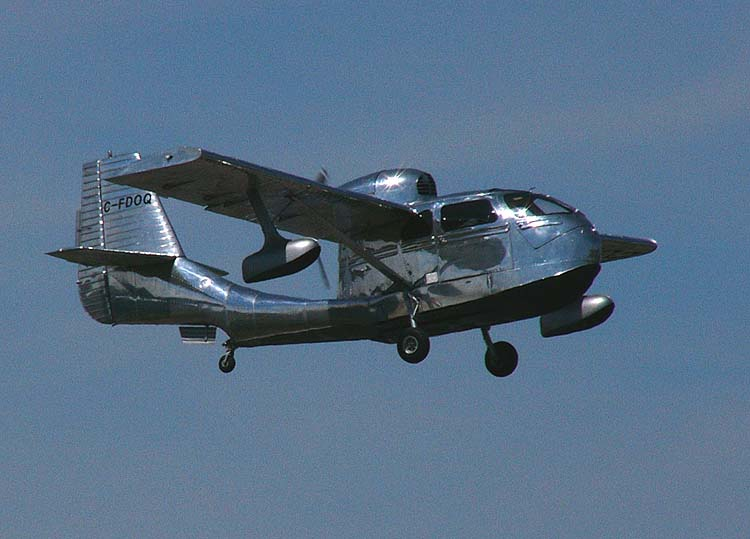
Republic RC-3 Seabee

Pickup earned a reputation for his expertise at flying, and became a legendary pilot to the communities he serviced. In a 1997 interview he suggested that most of the stories ascribed to him were untrue, citing one story in which he flew wearing nothing on his feet but slippers as particularly egregious as he "never owned a pair". An account by former Alert Bay dispatcher and pilot Villi Douglas tells that Pickup managed to evacuate a sick lighthouse keeper from Pine Island and achieve an inexplicable take-off in spite of massive swells. In another story relayed by Pickup himself, he had been forced to take a sick and intoxicated man from a remote camp to the hospital in Alert Bay, but was forced to take off at night. After take-off his patient regained consciousness and attacked him twice before Pickup knocked him out with a fire extinguisher and transported him the rest of the way to Alert Bay. Pickup racked up thousands of flight hours across 31 types of planes over the course of his career, almost always conducting take-offs and landings on water.

In 1954, Pickup became a founding member of the College of Family Physicians of Canada. In the 1970s, he served as mayor of Alert Bay for six years.

=== Death of Renee Smith ===
Among the First Nations communities serviced by Jack Pickup, including those on Cormorant Island, he earned a reputation for providing substandard medical care. On 22 January 1979, 11-year-old Renee Smith of the ʼNamgis First Nation died of appendicitis. Smith had been brought to St. George's Hospital suffering from severe abdominal pain on 18 January and died five days later after Pickup failed to either conduct a full medical examination, perform an appendectomy, or issue her the correct medications. Smith's death sparked two years of controversy and government inquiries surrounding Pickup's medical malpractice, especially amid accusations that Pickup's heavy drinking habit had affected his ability to provide proper treatment. The practice was not unaccustomed to physicians behaving poorly: at the time of Smith's death, two doctors Pickup had worked with in Alert Bay had had their medical licences made conditional due to alcoholism and another's had been suspended outright. The controversy also split the community along racial lines, with many white residents of Alert Bay defending Pickup, who at the time was not just a doctor and pilot but also the former mayor and incumbent president of the board of trade, and a number of letters to the editor were sent to local newspapers proclaiming his innocence. As the rift in the community grew, the administrator of St. George's Hospital, James Quigley, said resolving the issue would take "everyone working together, tolerance, co-operation, [and] understanding".

After conducting an investigation, College of Physicians and Surgeons of British Columbia issued a statement stating that Pickup had made "a regrettable and serious error in judgement", but took no action to stop him from practising medicine. In a statement made to the band government in June 1979, Dr. June Mills of North Battleford, Saskatchewan testified that Pickup's handling of Smith's illness was "on the level of malpractice". Pickup himself blamed the controversy on a small group of band council members having their distrust for him blown out of proportion by the media. Pearl Alfred, the contemporary band manager for the 'Namgis First Nation (then "Nimpkish First Nation"), was one of Pickup's primary opponents, and was quoted as saying:

Pickup's only part of the problem. We're looking at the whole queetion of Indian health statistics, which are pretty grim.

Minister of Health and Welfare David Crombie announced in September 1979 that a commission would be established to investigate claims of medical abuses in Alert Bay. The investigation was led by Dr. Gary Goldthorpe, and became known as the "Goldthorpe Inquiry" as a result. The Goldthorpe Inquiry began on 3 March 1980, and found that First Nations people were 25% more likely to die in Alert Bay than elsewhere in Canada and that at least three patients (including Smith) had died of neglect or errors in judgement on Pickup's part. Testimony given by a local woman during the inquiry blamed Pickup for the death of Edna Alfred, who Pickup had misdiagnosed with having "gas"; Alfred died days after Pickup refused her treatment of a uterine infection. The Goldthorpe Inquiry recommended Pickup resign and that a health centre be created on the island to better serve the 'Namgis First Nation. The proposal was met by resistance from the non-Native community in Alert Bay, St. George's Hospital staff, and the College of Physicians and Surgeons. As a representative of the federal government Goldthorpe had no official power to remove Pickup, who refused to resign and would continue working at St. George's Hospital for another 12 years. However, Pickup's ability to operate without oversight and accountability came to an end. Dr. Katherine A. Wotton, an associate of Dr. Gary Goldthorpe and a physician with four years of experience treating Indigenous patients in Manitoba, began working as Alert Bay's second doctor on 3 July 1980. As well, increased scrutiny and tighter restrictions were enacted on St. George's Hospital in 1981 in order to limit the kind of surgeries Pickup could perform, including those related to child birth. Nonetheless, a new hospital was constructed on the reservation and staffed by two doctors and three nurses from Island Health, all paid for by the band government.

=== Retirement and final years ===
After more than 40 years at St. George's Hospital, Pickup retired in late 1992 at the age of 73.

Pickup was involved in the creation of an airport in Alert Bay, and was one of seven members of the Village of Alert Bay Airport Committee established on 13 January 1994.

Jack Pickup died on 11 February 1996.

== Personal life ==
While practising in Alert Bay, Jack Pickup married his secretary, Lila.

Outside of flying for work, Jack Pickup also flew light aircraft as a hobby and continued to do so until the age of 67. Before attending medical school, Pickup had been interested in becoming a musician. Despite opting for a career in medicine, Pickup remained passionate about music and was known to be a skilled pianist. He was also adept at sailing.

== Legacy ==
Jack Pickup was modest when reflecting on his medical career. When asked in a 1997 interview with Aeroplane Monthly about the lives he impacted, Pickup replied:

I just treat ‘em: the Lord heals ‘em. No-one ever had a baby in my aeroplane.

Dr. John Ross, an early aviator and medevac pilot for Air BC, held Pickup in high regard, commenting:

Jack Pickup was at Alert Bay. He flew himself out to accidents. He was quite an interesting man. I met him a few times. He was a saint really. He worked up in Alert Bay for about forty years. He was the only doctor and he did everything. I don’t think he was appreciated as much as he should have been. Why he did it, I don’t know. I guess he just liked being a bit different.

Pickup is viewed more critically by Dr. Dan Cutfeet, an Alert Bay doctor originally from Kitchenuhmaykoosib Inninuwug First Nation. Dr. Cutfeet, in an interview with APTN, discussed the unique challenges posed to healthcare workers in the community during the COVID-19 pandemic by recalling the medical abuse Native people endured from Pickup, who he described as "on many occasions clearly and obviously drunk while performing as a doctor" and "verbally abusive, and disrespectful, toward Indian patients".

A number of physicians in British Columbia were taught or mentored by Pickup, including pediatrician Basil Boulton.

CF-CCW ("Big Red"), the Waco AQC-6 biplane that Pickup piloted for 27 years, was donated to the Canadian Museum of Flight in Langley in 1980 and is now on display there. The plane underwent decades of refurbishments and repairs before being deemed flight-worthy again after a successful test flight on 13 February 2002. The plane was flown many times in demonstrations throughout the 2000s before undergoing repairs in 2013 and relaunching in 2019. A similar red biplane is also depicted in the museum's official logo.

Dara Culhane Speck, a member of the 'Namgis First Nation by marriage, published a book in 1987 reflecting on the death of Renee Smith and ensuing controversy around Jack Pickup: An Error in Judgement: The Politics of Medical Care in an Indian/White Community.

Marilyn Crosbie, a personal friend of Pickup, published a memoir of her encounters and memories of him in 2012: Memories of Jack Pickup - Flying Doctor of British Columbia. Crosbie had originally conceived of the book in 1974 but held off on writing it until after both Pickup and Lila, his wife and the main objector to the project, passed away.

Pickup was posthumously awarded the Freedom of the Municipality Award by the municipal government of Alert Bay. Alert Bay Airport, which Pickup helped establish but died before it was completed, was named "Dr. Harold Jackson Pickup Airport" in his honour.

== See also ==
- Healthcare in Canada
- Royal Flying Doctor Service of Australia
