= Pearse Islands =

Island group in British Columbia, Canada

Coordinates: 50°35′06″N 126°51′54″W

The Pearse Islands are a small group of islands in the Queen Charlotte Strait region of the Central Coast of British Columbia, Canada. They are just east of Cormorant Island (British Columbia), which is the location of the Village of Alert Bay. Cormorant Channel Marine Provincial Park is located in this group of islands.

Islands in the group include Kulkeduma Island, which is the site of Kuldekuma IR No. 7, which is governed by the Namgis First Nation.

== Name origin ==
Like the Pearse Peninsula on nearby Broughton Island, the islands were named in 1860 for Commander William Alfred Rumbulow Pearse, RN, who commanded HMS Alert in the area from 1858 to 1861.
