= Haddington Island =

Island in British Columbia, Canada

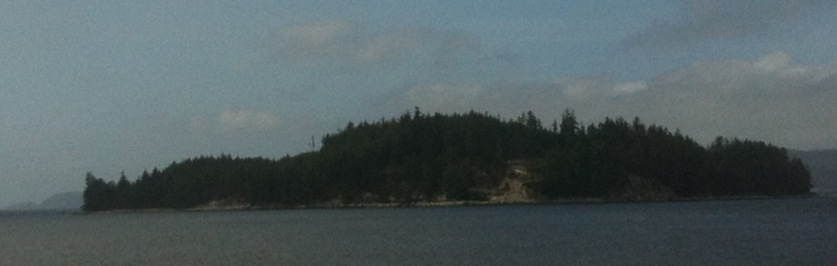

- Location within British Columbia

Geography
- Coordinates: 50°36′06″N 127°01′22″W
- Adjacent to: Broughton Strait

Administration
- Canada
- Province: British Columbia
- Regional district: Mount Waddington

Haddington Island (French: île Haddington) is a small volcanic island in the Canadian province of British Columbia, located in the Broughton Strait, and separated from Malcolm Island to the north by the Haddington Passage. It is located in the Mount Waddington Regional District.

The closest major community to Haddington Island is Port McNeill.

== Geology ==
Haddington Island is a member in the chain of eroded volcanoes that run from Brooks Peninsula northeastward across Vancouver Island to Port McNeill, called the Alert Bay Volcanic Belt. The existence of felsite and andesite at Haddington Island suggests it might have formed 3.7 million years ago as the Juan de Fuca and Explorer Plate to its west subducted under the North American Plate at the Cascadia subduction zone. As the ocean crust of the Juan de Fuca and the Explorer Plate melts, it creates magma that penetrates the crust, causing periodic eruptions of the volcanoes. The western end of the Alert Bay Volcanic Belt is now approximately 80 km (50 mi) northeast of the Nootka Fault, which separates the Explorer and Juan de Fuca plates. However, at the time of its formation Haddington Island may have been coincident with the subducted plate boundary. Also, the timing of volcanism corresponds to shifts of plate motion and changes in the locus of volcanism along the Pemberton and Garibaldi volcanic fronts. This brief interval of plate motion adjustment approximately 3.5 million years ago may have triggered the generation of basaltic magma along the descending plate edge.

Although commonly referred to as andesite, by chemical composition the Haddington Island volcanic rocks are in fact dacite. The rock has a very fine grained to aphanitic texture, and has a light blue-grey to a warm brown-grey range in colour. The groundmass comprises 80-85% plagioclase feldspar, with lesser quartz, biotite and magnetite. Small, 1–2 mm plagioclase phenocrysts are distributed through the rock mass, and form approximately 1% of its volume.

== Quarrying ==
The grey to bluff andesite on Haddington Island is considered by many to be British Columbia's finest building stone because it is easily profiled and carved. Some of British Columbia's landmark buildings were faced with Haddington Island andesite, including the Hotel Vancouver and the British Columbia Parliament Buildings. Further information on the historic use of andesite on buildings in Vancouver can be found in the article Andesite in Vancouver Matters, BlueImprint Books, 2008 by Rob Brownie and Annabel Vaughan.

The Haddington Island Quarry initially operated between 1896 and 1966. It was reopened in 2004 by Haddington Island Stoneworks of Vancouver, BC.

== History ==
The island was named after Thomas Haddington. A provincial ferry, the Queen of Prince Rupert, ran up on the rocks here in 1967.

== See also ==
- List of volcanoes in Canada
- Volcanism of Canada
- Volcanism of Western Canada
