= Transformer (spirit-being) =

The Transformer is a pre-eminent spirit-being in many traditions of the indigenous peoples of the Pacific Northwest Coast of North America and among some Interior peoples in the same part of the continent. Often appearing as more than one being, and seen in the plural as Transformers, the name of this/these being(s) varies from people to people, though all Coast Salish names are similar:

- In Squamish, the name is Xáays and in their tradition there were not one Transformer, but more than one, referred to as the Transformer Brothers.
- In Halkomelem, the name is Xaːls; see X̲áːytem.
- in Lummi, the name of the Transformer is Xelas, sometimes Xeʼlas

The name of one of the Transformers in Kwakʼwala is Q!aʼneqe lak, who married the daughter of a chief of the ʼNamgis at the village of Whulk at the mouth of the Nimpkish River; the chief, Gwaʼ nalalis, was later transformed by Q!aʼneqe lak into the Nimpkish River.

== See also ==
- Coyote in mythology
