= Whulk =

Former village on northern Vancouver Island

Coordinates: 50°34′15″N 126°59′00″W

Whulk or xwalkw, meaning "(logs) place crossewise", was a Kwakwaka'wakw village at the mouth of the Nimpkish River on northern Vancouver Island, which was a place of origin for some of the groups comprising today's 'Namgis group of Kwakwaka'wakw, who now reside mostly at Yalis on Cormorant Island (i.e. Alert Bay Indian Reserve No. 1).

At Whulk, in legendary times, the Transformer Q!a'neqe lak married the daughter of a chief of Whulk, Gwa' nalalis, who was later transformer into the Nimpkish River, which is known as gwa' ne in Kwak'wala

When visited respectively by Galiano and Vancouver in 1792, there were 34 houses at Whulk, with a population estimated as 200–900 at the time. The site is also known as Cheslakees, though attempts to connect that name with names documented in oral history have failed, though it is supposed to be the name of the village's leading chief at the time of Galiano's and Vancouver's visits. Ches-la-kee Indian Reserve No. 3 was created in 1886 including the location of Whulk.

== See also ==
- List of Kwakwaka'wakw villages
