= Bere Point Regional Park =

- Location within British Columbia Location within Canada
- Coordinates: 50°39′N 127°03′W
- Operator: Regional District of Mount Waddington
- Website: Bere Point Campsite

Bere Point is a regional park in British Columbia, Canada, located on Malcolm Island in the Queen Charlotte Strait region of the Central Coast.

The park is located six kilometers North from downtown Sointula. The park hosts approximately 30 campsites and a group campsite located on the waterfront on the north shore of Malcolm Island.

The campground provides access to Beautiful Bay Trail which runs 5km to Malcolm Point. There are public whale watching platforms situated along the trail to observe occasional rubbing behaviour by Orca whales on the rock beaches.
