= Broughton Strait =

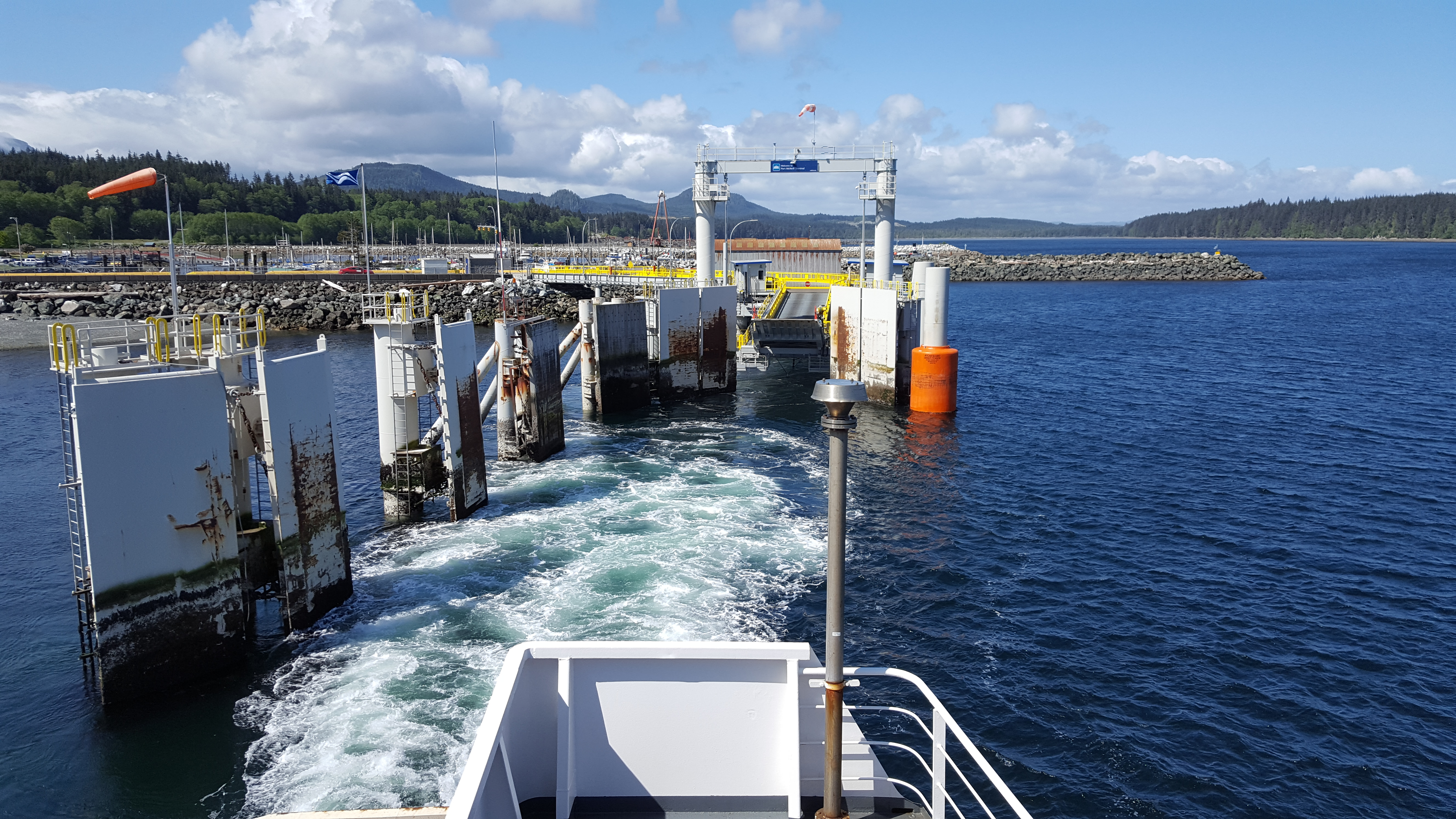
- View of Broughton Strait from Port McNeil

- Location within British Columbia

- Location: British Columbia, Canada
- Coordinates: 50°36′13″N 127°02′08″W
- Type: strait
- Part of: Queen Charlotte Strait
- Islands: Haddington Island

Broughton Strait is a strait off the north coast of Vancouver Island, British Columbia, Canada, separating that island from Malcolm and Cormorant Islands, on the farther side of which is the larger Queen Charlotte Strait, which also lies beyond the western end of Broughton Strait, and the mouth of Knight Inlet. Farther east from Broughton Strait is the beginning of Johnstone Strait, which leads via Discovery Passage to the Strait of Georgia.

Communities on the Broughton Strait include Port McNeill, on Vancouver Island, and Sointula and Alert Bay, on Malcolm and Cormorant Islands respectively. Haddington Island is located in the middle of the strait.

== History ==
The area was explored in 1792 by the Vancouver Expedition, and Captain Vancouver named Broughton Strait, Broughton Island, and Broughton Archipelago all after William Robert Broughton, who accompanied Vancouver on his exploration in these waters as captain of HMS Chatham.

During World War I, Broughton Strait was closed to shipping traffic via mines strung between Malcolm Island and Vancouver Island at McNeill point. Two small torpedo boats patrolled the waters at night.

== See also ==
- British Columbia Coast
