= Nimpkish Lake Provincial Park =

Provincial park in British Columbia, Canada

- IUCN category II (national park)
- Location within Vancouver Island Location within British Columbia
- Interactive map of Nimpkish Lake Provincial Park
- Location: British Columbia, Canada
- Nearest city: Port McNeill
- Coordinates: 50°20′19″N 127°00′00″W
- Area: 39.49 km^{2} (15.25 sq mi)
- Established: July 13, 1995
- Governing body: BC Parks

Nimpkish Lake Provincial Park is a provincial park on northern Vancouver Island, British Columbia, Canada on Vancouver Island. The park is 3,949 ha. in area and was established on 1995. It is 32 km south of Port McNeill and on the southwest side of Nimpkish Lake. Primary access is by boat launch, though radio-controlled logging roads lead to the edge of the park. Western Forest Products in Woss, British Columbia should be contacted for road advisories. The park is in the traditional territory of the Namgis First Nation.

The M/V Nimpkish in the BC Ferries fleet is named after the lake.

== See also ==
- Lower Nimpkish Provincial Park
- Nimpkish River
