= School District 85 Vancouver Island North =

School district in British Columbia, Canada

Location
- Port Hardy Port Hardy, Port McNeill, Port Alice, Alert Bay, Sointula in Vancouver Island Canada

District information
- Superintendent: Mr Scott Benwell
- Schools: 11
- Budget: CA$17.9 million

Students and staff
- Students: 1530

Other information
- Website: sd85.bc.ca

School District 85 Vancouver Island North is a school district in British Columbia. It is based in the town of Port Hardy. It provides service to the communities northern tip of Vancouver Island including Port McNeill and Woss as well as the adjacent smaller islands such as Alert Bay.

== Schools ==
School	Location	Grades
A J Elliott Elementary School	Sointula	K-7
Alert Bay Elementary School	Alert Bay	K-7
Cheslakees Elementary School	Port McNeill	K-5
Continuing Ed SD 85	Port Hardy	11-12
Eagle View Elementary School	Port Hardy	K-7
Echo Bay Elementary School (Closed)	Simoom Sound	K-5
Eke Me-Xi School	Port Hardy	9-11
Fort Rupert Elementary School	Port Hardy	K-7
North Island Secondary School	Port McNeill	8-12
Port Hardy Secondary School	Port Hardy	8-12
Quatsino Elementary School (Closed)	Quatsino	K-9
Robert Scott Elementary School (Closed)	Port Hardy	K-7
San Josef Elem-Jr Secondary School (Closed)	Holberg	K-6
Sea View Elem-Jr Secondary School	Port Alice	K-10
Sunset Elementary School	Port McNeill	K-7
Woss Lake Elementary School	Woss	K-7

== See also ==
- List of school districts in British Columbia
