= Twin Peaks (British Columbia) =

Group of mountains in British Columbia, Canada

- Location within Vancouver Island Location within British Columbia
- Interactive map of Twin Peaks

Highest point
- Elevation: 1,208 m (3,963 ft)
- Prominence: 383 m (1,257 ft)
- Coordinates: 50°29′55″N 127°14′50″W

Geography
- Location: Vancouver Island, British Columbia, Canada
- District: Rupert Land District
- Parent range: Vancouver Island Ranges
- Topo map: NTS 92L6 Alice Lake

Geology
- Rock age: 3.0 million years
- Volcanic belt: Alert Bay Volcanic Belt

Twin Peaks, also known as Twin Peaks Mountain, is a volcanic peak on northern Vancouver Island in southwestern British Columbia, Canada, located 14 km (8.7 mi) southwest of Port McNeill. It consists of andesite lava that was erupted three million years ago when the Alert Bay Volcanic Belt was volcanically active during the Pliocene period.

== See also ==
- List of volcanoes in Canada
- Volcanism of Canada
- Volcanism of Western Canada
