= Lower Nimpkish Provincial Park =

Provincial park in British Columbia, Canada, located on the lower Nimpkish River

- IUCN category II (national park)
- Location within Vancouver Island Location within British Columbia
- Interactive map of Lower Nimpkish Provincial Park
- Location: British Columbia, Canada
- Nearest city: Port McNeill
- Coordinates: 50°32′14″N 127°00′40″W
- Area: 2 km^{2} (0.77 sq mi)
- Established: July 13, 1995
- Governing body: BC Parks

Lower Nimpkish Provincial Park is a provincial park in British Columbia, Canada, located on the lower Nimpkish River. It is an undeveloped wilderness park that seeks to preserve the habitat while offering fishing and nature appreciation opportunities to the public.

== See also ==
- Nimpkish Lake Provincial Park
