= Basil Boulton =

Canadian physician

Basil Cartwright Boulton
- Born: March 6, 1938; Consort, Alberta, Canada
- Died: January 3, 2008 (aged 69); Esquimalt, British Columbia, Canada
- Occupations: Pediatrician, Municipal Councillor
- Known for: Advocacy for child health
- Awards: Queen Elizabeth II Golden Jubilee Medal

Basil Cartwright Boulton (March 6, 1938 to January 3, 2008) was a Canadian pediatrician, child health advocate, and local politician in Victoria, British Columbia.

== Early years ==
Basil Boulton was born in Consort, Alberta, Canada, the youngest of seven children. He grew up on Gabriola Island, located in British Columbia's Strait of Georgia (now named the Salish Sea), where he developed a love of nature at an early age. His family cleared and developed Somerset Farm, which remains the largest working farm on Gabriola Island, occupying over 400 acres or 162 hectares. Boulton attended secondary school in Nanaimo, on Vancouver Island.

== Education and residency ==
Boulton attended the University of British Columbia in Vancouver, British Columbia, graduating from medical school in 1963. He enjoyed summer breaks in the Gulf of Alaska working on halibut boats.

Initially planning on a career in general practice, Boulton's first clinical experience was with Dr. Jack Pickup in Alert Bay on northern Vancouver Island, whom he described as a "true individual" who taught him "to think beyond the textbooks in dealing with real life situations." Pickup was known as the "Flying Doctor of British Columbia", who learned to fly in 1950 and purchased an airplane to "reach sick and injured people in the many villages and camps of the region he served" who were spread out over 10,000 square kilometres. One writer said that beyond Pickup's main claim to fame, he was also "a teacher, Alert Bay's Mayor, a skilled classical and jazz pianist and dry wit whose behaviour occasionally bordered on curmudgeonly."

Boulton spent the following two years in Canada's first General Practice residency program at the Montreal General Hospital in Montreal, Quebec, which he said "took the starch out of me with an exhausting alternate night call blur of sleeplessness lasting the next two years." He enjoyed two rotations away. He spent four months in Sherbrooke, Quebec, under the wing of Dr. Robert Paulette, whom Boulton described as "one of the most capable surgeons I have known. He taught me qualities of care and caring that have stayed with me through life."

The second rotation in 1964 in Charlotte, North Carolina was where Boulton found his calling in pediatrics. Boulton stated, "for the first time, I found Pediatrics was fun. I did more for children in my first four months than I did in the remaining two years of residency spent caring for adults. This was striking not only in lives saved but more so in life years saved and disabilities and disease prevented for later adult life." Dr. Bryant Galusha, then Pediatric Director of what later became the Carolinas Medical Center, "taught me to enjoy and understand the pediatric literature and gave me the confidence to trust in my own ability. I learned that pediatrics was both fun and academically stimulating." But in those "early days of racial integration in the southern U.S.A", Boulton was struck by the "huge array of medical problems among those too poor to afford private medical care." Homesick for Vancouver, he declined an offer to stay on as Director of Pediatric Education.

In 1967, Boulton spent his third year of residency in pediatrics at Vancouver General Hospital's Health Care Center for Children. Boulton had been awarded a Queen Elizabeth II Fellowship to work with Dr. Denny Vince in pediatric cardiology. The head of pediatrics was Dr. Sidney Israels, whom Boulton described as "more knowledgeable in basic science and pathophysiology than any other clinical pediatrician I have known. He taught us to think." Israels was a major force in the later creation of the first Children's Hospital in the province, British Columbia Children's Hospital.

== Medical practice and teaching career ==
In 1969, Boulton moved to Victoria, British Columbia, where he established a medical practice as the "first pediatrician in Victoria with skills in the emerging fields of modern neonatal and intensive care," a work which grew to become "one of the busiest critical care pediatric practices in the province." Boulton had particular interest in children facing poverty who might have complex health issues, and worked in the areas of First nations health, child abuse and fetal alcohol syndrome. Eventually Boulton became chief of pediatrics at the Royal Jubilee Hospital as well as the Queen Alexandra Centre for Children's Health.

Boulton was the first physician in Victoria with a clinical academic appointment from the University of British Columbia and to train pediatric residents at Victoria's Royal Jubilee Hospital. Later he initiated clinical training of third year medical students at Victoria General Hospital. Boulton continued to teach as a clinical professor of pediatrics throughout his career.

A colleague described Boulton as "intense and detailed in his practice of medicine, taking every symptom of a patient very seriously. And he always sought the best possible investigation and treatment." Boulton described his time with his patients as a sacred place: "I found myself in a sacred place in being able to touch and impact the lives of so many people." When Boulton was with a child patient, that child was "the most special person in the world, my favourite patient. Whenever somebody came, you had to find out what their special need or ability was, and deal with that, and it varied so much." He found that the children he could help most were children with cancer: "Maybe you couldn't give them the medicine, but you could give them a piece of yourself." Although he practiced medicine for 35 years, he remembered almost every child patient by name. He told an interviewer, "I have to give you names because that's how I think of my kids. Not 'a kid with cerebral palsy.'"

Boulton continued active practice until 2004.

== Testifying as expert witness ==
Boulton frequently testified in court as an expert witness regarding the consultations he had with his clients. Some published cases include:

- Speer v. Sather (2001 BCSC): Boulton's medical report was considered in a negligence action arising from the alleged shaking of the child plaintiff by her foster mother; the court declined an application to adjourn the trial.
- Zhu v. Zhu (1998 BCSC): Boulton's evidence was considered in assessing damages sustained by a child in a motor vehicle collision.
- Rhoule v. Walters (1997 BCSC): Boulton's report was considered in assessing damages from severe dog bite or bites to a child.
- Forsythe v. Hai (1993 BCSC): Boulton's evidence was involved in the court's finding that there was no sexual abuse of a three-year-old child.

== Leadership and advocacy for child health ==
In 1977, Boulton led a campaign to improve pediatric and maternity services in the Victoria, B.C. region. At the time, services were split between two major hospitals, the former St. Joseph's Hospital and the Royal Jubilee Hospital. The result was a "single, well-equipped and staffed, integrated unit" at the new Victoria General Hospital.

In 1980, together with former Deputy Minister of Health, James Mainguy, Boulton co-authored a comprehensive study of child health care in the Capital Region of British Columbia. As a result, all child health services throughout the region were coordinated years before regional Health Authorities were formed. The study also resulted in the creation of a Child and Family Ambulatory Unit at Victoria General Hospital, and the establishment of child and adolescent psychiatric services at Ledger House.

In the 1990s, Boulton participated in a service mission as part of a Christian Medical and Dental Society delegation providing supplies and expertise to doctors in Cuba. The team worked with the Cuban Ministry of Health and Cuban doctors to improve the health and welfare of children in Cuba.

Boulton was active on many boards and committees that promoted the interests of children, including the READ Society, which promotes literacy; and the Sail and Life Training Society, a Christian organization providing learning experiences to young people on tall ships. He chaired the British Columbia Medical Association's Child and Youth Health Committee, and served on its Council of Health Promotion. He also served as a director of the Greater Victoria Hospital Society.

After retiring from medical practice, Boulton continued to advocate for children's health. For several years, he advocated for a bill of health care rights for children and youth in British Columbia, which he was working on at the time of his death. At that time, he was also working on a "pilot program in the schools that combined a mental health team, medical team, and educators to better support children."

== Municipal politics ==
Boulton became increasingly active in the Township of Esquimalt, located on the west border of Victoria, British Columbia. He was elected to the municipal council, where he served from 1999 to 2002 and 2005 until his death. In his role as councillor, Boulton continued to advocate for children in the broader community on the Capital Region Family Court Committee and the Action Team for Sexually Exploited Youth.

== Family ==
Boulton married Marilyn, his wife of 46 years, while in medical school. They had four children. Boulton was also survived by nine grandchildren and five siblings.

== Honours and awards ==
Some awards that Boulton received during his lifetime include:

- 2002 - Queen Elizabeth II Golden Jubilee Medal awarded for Boulton's work as an advocate for children. The Medal "was awarded to Canadians who have made outstanding and exemplary contributions to their communities or to Canada as a whole. The award focuses both on the achievements of those people who, over the past 50 years, have helped create the Canada of today, and on the achievements of younger Canadians who are actively contributing to our future."
- 2004 - British Columbia Medical Association (BCMA) Silver Medal of Service. This award is given to members with long and distinguished service to the BCMA, and/or outstanding contributions to medicine and/or medical/political involvement in British Columbia or Canada.
- 2006 - Wallace Wilson Leadership Award of the University of British Columbia Medical Alumni Association. This award is "presented to a graduate who has demonstrated high ethical standards and outstanding leadership to the profession."

Awards granted posthumously include:

- 2008 - Canadian Paediatric Society's Certificate of Merit. These awards "recognize members who have made exceptional contributions to the health of children and youth at a regional level."
- 2008 - British Columbia Medical Association's Excellence in Health Promotion Award, given for "extraordinary results in promoting health and wellness in British Columbia".

Nov. 30, 2009 saw the publication of a report named in Boulton's honour: The Boulton Initiative: A Child Rights Approach to Canadian Child Health Services: Final Report. "The initiative began as part of Dr. Basil Boulton's dream to make child rights a central theme and way of life for health professionals" (p. 5). The International Institute for Child Rights and Development (IICRD) and the University of British Columbia's Department of Pediatrics worked together to create a plan "for a national initiative to incorporate a child rights approach into the education, policies and practices of Canadian child and youth health services" (p. 4). The 2012-2013 annual report of the IICRD states that for child medical professionals in Canada, existing partners were awaiting "first stage systems and curriculum development" at the University of Florida Medical School.

Boulton's family was instrumental in creating the Basil Boulton Memorial Scholarship, awarded annually to a third or fourth year Island Medical Program student interested in pediatrics or international health. The Island Medical Program is the University of British Columbia's MD undergraduate program delivered in collaboration with the University of Victoria, the provincial government and health authorities.

== Quotations ==
=== On a bill of health care rights for children and youth ===
"Adults are deeply affected by their childhoods. Many chronic diseases originate in childhood, and lifelong disabilities may be prevented with good perinatal and pediatric care. Issues of growth and development influence later mental health and intellectual capacity. Health care provisions built on an understanding of children and youth can avoid or lessen many of these problems.... A Bill of Health Care Rights for Children and Youth will assist Ms Mary Ellen Turpel-Lafond, BC's new Children's Representative. The bill will provide a level playing field for children and youth who must depend on services directed and provided by government. The consequences of failing to rise to the challenge of providing adequate health care to these children are profound." - Each of once us was once a child, 2007.

=== On child abuse ===
"Society has been concerned about the maltreatment of children for millennia, but it is only in recent times that doctors have developed the scientific basis for the recognition and understanding of child abuse.... The medical system should not be complacent. Doctors should not opt out or be excluded from areas where they ought to contribute. Family doctors and specialists caring for children need to continually improve their skills in the recognition, diagnosis, and management of child abuse, and multidisciplinary specialized teams need to be available in each health region.... Turf protection and jurisdictional concerns must not be allowed to interfere." - A bill of health care rights for children and youth?, 2006.

=== On broken promises to children ===
"For more than 40 years the Canadian government has guaranteed medical care as a right to all Canadian citizens. This promise has not been honored for children and youth, and this needs to be rectified.... Children and youth need effective diagnostic, assessment, and treatment services available as close to their homes as possible in order to provide for their care and to support their families, daycares, preschools, schools, protection services, and community agencies. Failure to provide adequate developmental and mental health services for children results in greater lifelong disability, adverse health outcomes, increased dysfunctionality in adults, as well as increased costs manifested through lost productivity, broken relationships, and antisocial behavior. The inequality and discrepancy in health services provided for children and youth is evidenced in the allocation of health care dollars. The 0 to 19-year-old age group represents more than 25% of the population in British Columbia but receives less than 10% of the health care budget.... Children are the custodians of our future. They must no longer be left at the back of the line." - A bill of health care rights for children and youth?, 2005.
