= Pearse Peninsula =

Peninsula in British Columbia, Canada

Coordinates: 50°47′24″N 126°33′32″W

The Pearse Peninsula is a peninsula on the southwest end of Broughton Island in the Broughton Archipelago of the Queen Charlotte Strait region of the Central Coast of British Columbia, Canada.

== Name origin ==
The peninsula was named in 1860 for Commander William Alfred Rumbulow Pearse, RN, who commanded HMS Alert in the area from 1858 to 1861. He is also the namesake of the Pearse Islands at the northern entrance to the Johnstone Strait.
