= Kalervo Oberg =

Canadian anthropologist

Dr. Kalervo Oberg Ph.D.
- Born: January 15, 1901; Nanaimo, British Columbia
- Died: July 11, 1973 (aged 72); Corvallis, Oregon
- Citizenship: Canadian, American
- Education: British Columbia (BEc, PhD)

Kalervo Oberg (January 15, 1901 – July 11, 1973) was a Canadian anthropologist. Oberg was dedicated to fieldwork, serving as a civil servant and a teacher. He travelled the world and wrote about these experiences so others could enjoy them as well. Oberg is perhaps best known for applying the term culture shock to all people who travel abroad into new cultures and for his doctoral dissertation, The Social Economy of the Tlingit Indians of Alaska.

== Early life ==
Oberg was born to Finnish parents in Nanaimo, British Columbia in 1901. His family moved to Sointula, British Columbia, when Oberg was very young. His family left after the collapse of the settlement.

== Education ==
Oberg earned a bachelor's degree in economics from the University of British Columbia. He authored a research piece on the utopian community that had previously existed at Sointula, Sointula A Communistic Society in British Columbia (UBC, 1928).

He attended the University of Pittsburgh, where he earned a master's degree in economics, and his doctorate from University of Chicago linked economics and the social organization among the Tlingit, an Alaskan Native tribe.

== Culture shock ==
As an adult, Oberg spent much of his time in the United States, teaching in universities in Missouri and Montana, and became a U.S. citizen in 1944. Along with teaching in the United States, Oberg spent time as a student and teacher in other countries. He attended the London School of Economics during two different periods in the 1930s.

He lived in São Paulo for a time, teaching at the Free School of Sociology and Political Science. however he didn't obtain a permanent position. Oberg then worked in various government postings overseas, including the Institute of Inter-American Affairs, a forerunner of the U.S. Agency for International Development, with assignments including Ecuador, Peru, Brazil, and Surinam. After his employment with the government, Oberg found teaching positions at Cornell, the University of Southern California, and also Oregon State University, on a part-time basis late in his career.

Oberg gave a talk to the Women's Club of Rio de Janeiro on August 3, 1954, explaining feelings common to those facing their first cross-cultural experience. In so doing, he identified 4 stages of culture shock, which continue to be commonly used, for example in Winkleman's stages of cultural adaptation. Bobbs-Merrill published Oberg's talk later in 1954, and it was republished in Practical Anthropology (7:177-182) in 1960.

== Death ==
He died on July 11, 1973.

The June 1974 American Anthropologist 76(2):356-360 published an obituary for Oberg.
