= Hanson Island =

Island in British Columbia, Canada

Coordinates: 50°34′13″N 126°44′22″W

Hanson Island is an island in the Queen Charlotte Strait region of the Central Coast of British Columbia, located west of Harbledown Island and south of the Plumper Islands. The westernmost part of Johnstone Strait is to the south of the island, Blackfish Sound to the north, beyond which is Swanson Island. The island is named for James Hanson who served aboard HMS Chatham in 1792 and was later transferred that year to command Vancouver's supply ship HMS Daedalus.
