= X̱á:ytem =

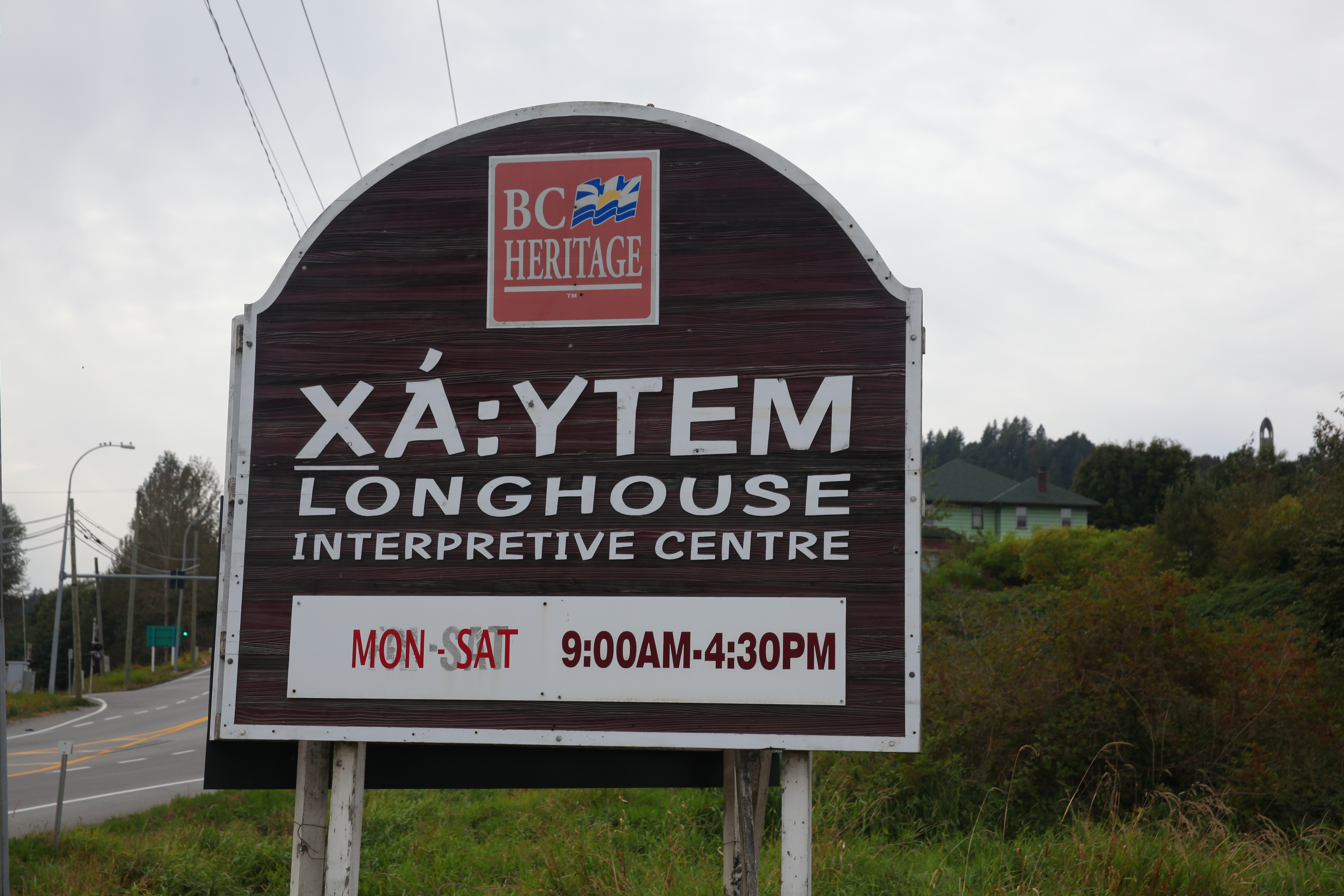
- Sign for the X̱á:ytem Longhouse Interpretive Centre
- Interactive map of X̱á:ytem
- 49°09′05″N 122°15′06″W
- Location: Hatzic, Mission, British Columbia, Canada

Site notes
- Current use: Active archaeological site and museum

National Historic Site of Canada
- Designated: 4 June 1992

X̱á:ytem (/ˈhaɪtəm, ˈhɑːɪtəm/) is an indigenous archaeological site and the name of a related museum run under the auspices of the Stoːlo people at Hatzic, British Columbia, Canada. X̱á:ytem is approximately 80 kilometres east of Vancouver on Highway 7. It is reached via the bridge at Mission, about 15 kilometres from the border with the US state of Washington. The site was designated in 1992 as a national historic site of Canada for its spiritual value to the Stoːlo people, as well as being a habitation site of great antiquity at approximately 5000 years old. It was listed on the Canadian register of historic places in 2005. It is also known as Hatzic Rock National Historic Site of Canada.

== History ==
Indigenous peoples occupied this area along the northern bank of the Fraser River for thousands of years. The historical peoples who encountered European colonists were the Stoːlo.

Over time, during the years after alienation of native lands by colonization, the site of X̱á:ytem had been used as a pasture. The property is adjacent to a highway built in the early 20th century. After it was sold to a developer and initial work on grading the site was begun, concerns about the site's potential archaeological value prompted an examination by Gordon Mohs. This led to the dramatic finding that it was immensely ancient, and included direct physical evidence connecting the Sto:lo to their spiritual mythology.

Following the discovery, the government arranged to transfer the land to the Stóːlō, the First Nation that has historically been in the area, for archaeological and museum purposes. It paid the erstwhile owner compensation for his lost opportunity in development; an extensive residential subdivision had been planned. The Stóːlō have built a museum, the X̱á:ytem Longhouse Interpretive Centre, to educate visitors about the site.

One culturally and spiritually significant feature of the site is Hatzic Rock, a large boulder that, in Stoːlo mythology, represents three Stoːlo leaders, conjoined and turned to stone by the transformer god XaːIs.

Excavations have been carried out in consultation with the Stóːlō. Researchers have found at the habitation site "evidence of rectangular pit/ longhouses of long-term occupation with remains of post, hearth and floor features, trade goods, storage, food, and spiritual activity."

== See also ==
- Archaeology of the Americas
- Arlington Springs Man - (Human remains)
- Calico Early Man Site – (Archeological site)
- Cueva de las Manos – (Cave paintings)
- Buhl Woman – (Human remains)
- Fort Rock Cave – (Archeological site)
- Kennewick Man – (Human remains)
- Kwäday Dän Tsʼìnchi – (Human remains)
- Marmes Rockshelter – (Archeological site)
- Luzia Woman – (Human remains)
- Mummy Cave – (Archeological site)
- Paisley Caves – (Archeological site)
