= Plumper Islands =

Island group in British Columbia, Canada

Coordinates: 50°35′10″N 126°47′05″W

The Plumper Islands, also referred to as the Plumper Group, are a small group of island located between Hanson Island and the Pearse Islands in the Queen Charlotte Strait region of the Central Coast of British Columbia. The island are named for HMS Plumper, which surveyed the Coast of British Columbia in 1858–1861.
