= Alert Bay Volcanic Belt =

Geologic formation in British Columbia, Canada

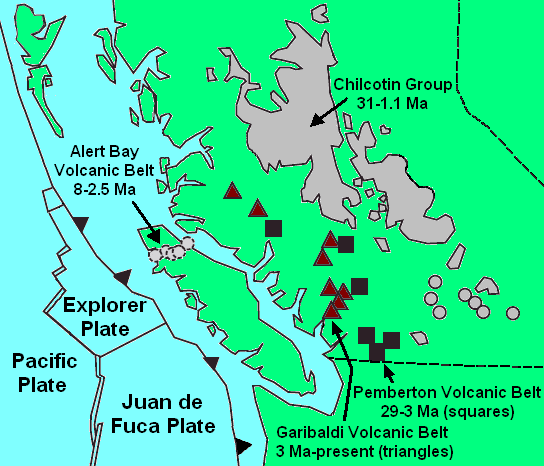
Geological formations related to volcanism in the Canadian Cascade Arc, including the Alert Bay Volcanic Belt

The Alert Bay Volcanic Belt is a heavily eroded volcanic belt in northern Vancouver Island, British Columbia, Canada. The series of volcanic rocks and subvolcanic intrusions formed between about 8 and 2.5 million years ago during the late Neogene period. The belt extends from the Brooks Peninsula in the southwest to Port McNeill in the northeast. Eruptions of basaltic to rhyolitic volcanoes and hypabyssal rocks of the Alert Bay Volcanic Belt are probably linked with the subducted margin flanked by the Explorer and Juan de Fuca plates at the Cascadia subduction zone.

The belt is now north of the Nootka Fault, but may have been directly above the fault at the time it last erupted. The Alert Bay Volcanic Belt is poorly studied, but appears to have been active in Miocene to Pliocene time. No Holocene eruptions are known, and volcanic activity in the belt has most likely ceased.

== Features ==
The features within the belt include:

- Cluxewe Mountain
- Haddington Island
- Klaskish Plutonic Suite
- Twin Peaks

== See also ==
- Garibaldi Volcanic Belt
- Pemberton Volcanic Belt
