= Nimpkish River =

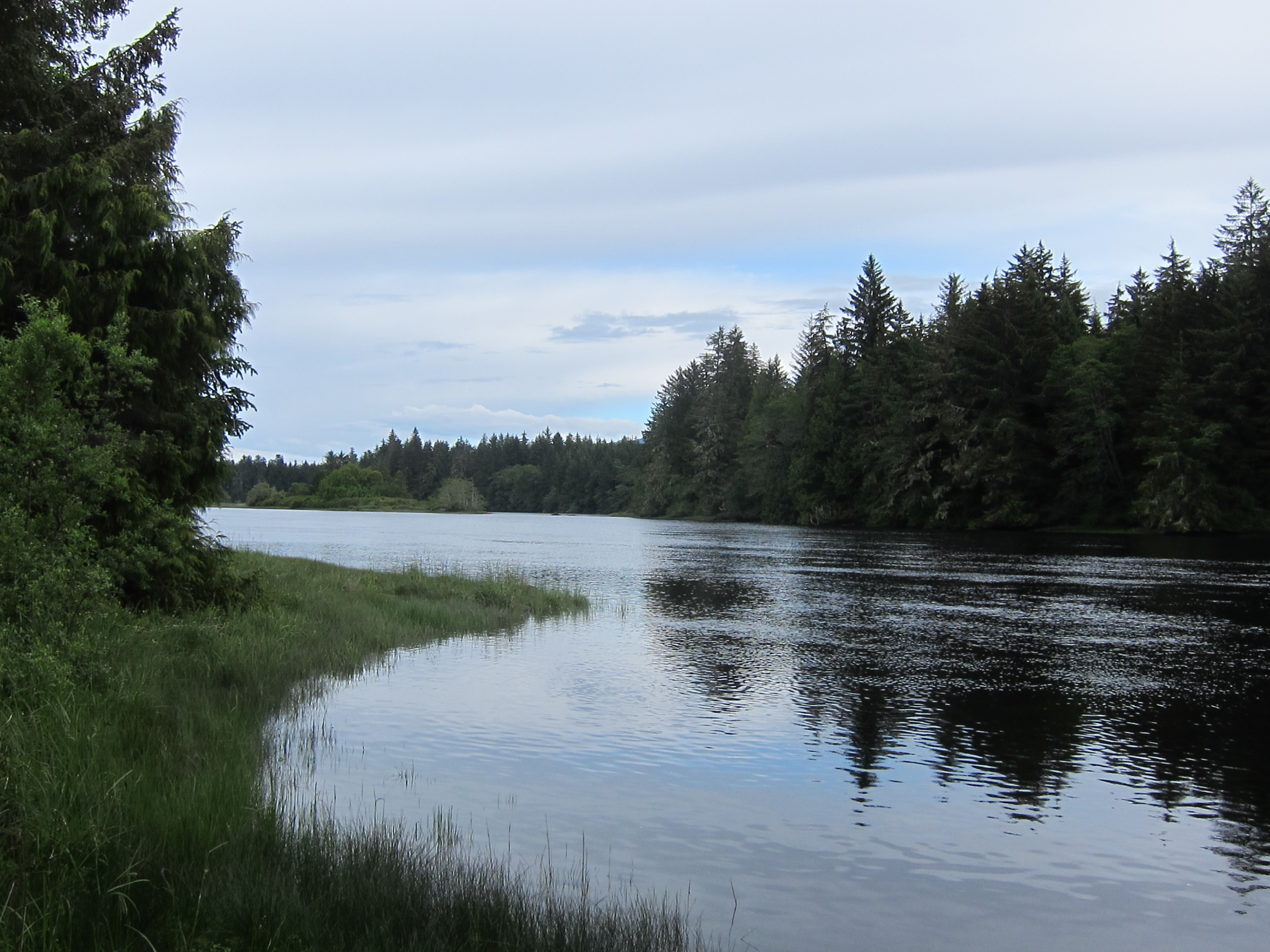
- The Nimpkish River below Nimpkish Lake

Location
- Country: Canada
- Province: British Columbia
- District: Rupert Land District
- Region: Northern Vancouver Island

Physical characteristics
- Source
  - location: Mount Alston
  - coordinates: 50.0177°N 126.2352°W
  - elevation: 1,415 m (4,642 ft)
- Mouth
  - location: Broughton Strait
  - coordinates: 50°33′59″N 126°58′55″W
  - elevation: 0 m (0 ft)
- Length: 118.1 km (73.4 mi)

The Nimpkish River is a river in northern Vancouver Island in British Columbia, Canada. It is the longest river on the Island, rising on the west slope of Mount Alston, flowing northwest into Nimpkish Lake and then north into the Broughton Strait at a point 8 km east of Port McNeill, just southwest of the town of Alert Bay on Cormorant Island.

== Name origin ==
"Nimpkish" is an anglicization of the Kwak'wala name for the people of this area, the 'Namgis.

== See also ==
- List of rivers of British Columbia
