= ʼNamgis =

Location of the 'Namgis nation in British Columbia

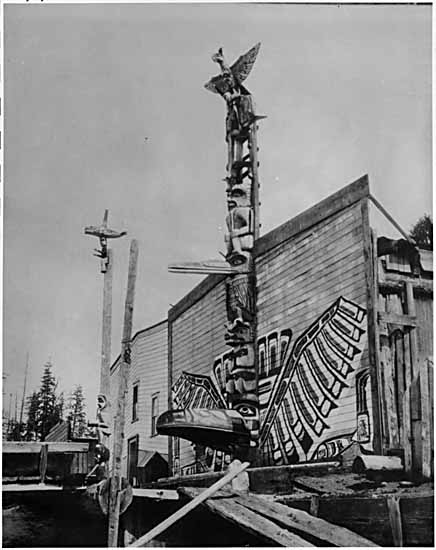
Totem poles in front of homes in Alert Bay in the 1900s

The ʼNamgis (Kwak'wala: ʼNa̱mg̱is) are an Indigenous nation, a part of the Kwakwakaʼwakw, in central British Columbia, on northern Vancouver Island. Their main village is now ʼYalis, on Cormorant Island adjacent to Alert Bay. The Indian Act First Nations government of this nation is the ʼNamgis First Nation. They were formerly known as the Nimpkish.

The nation is composed of 5 clans (5 ’Na̱mima): Tsi’tsilwa’lag̱ami, Tʼłatła̱lamin, Gig̱alg̱am, Sisa̱ntʼłe’, ʼNina̱lk̓inux̱w.
