= Sointula =

- Village
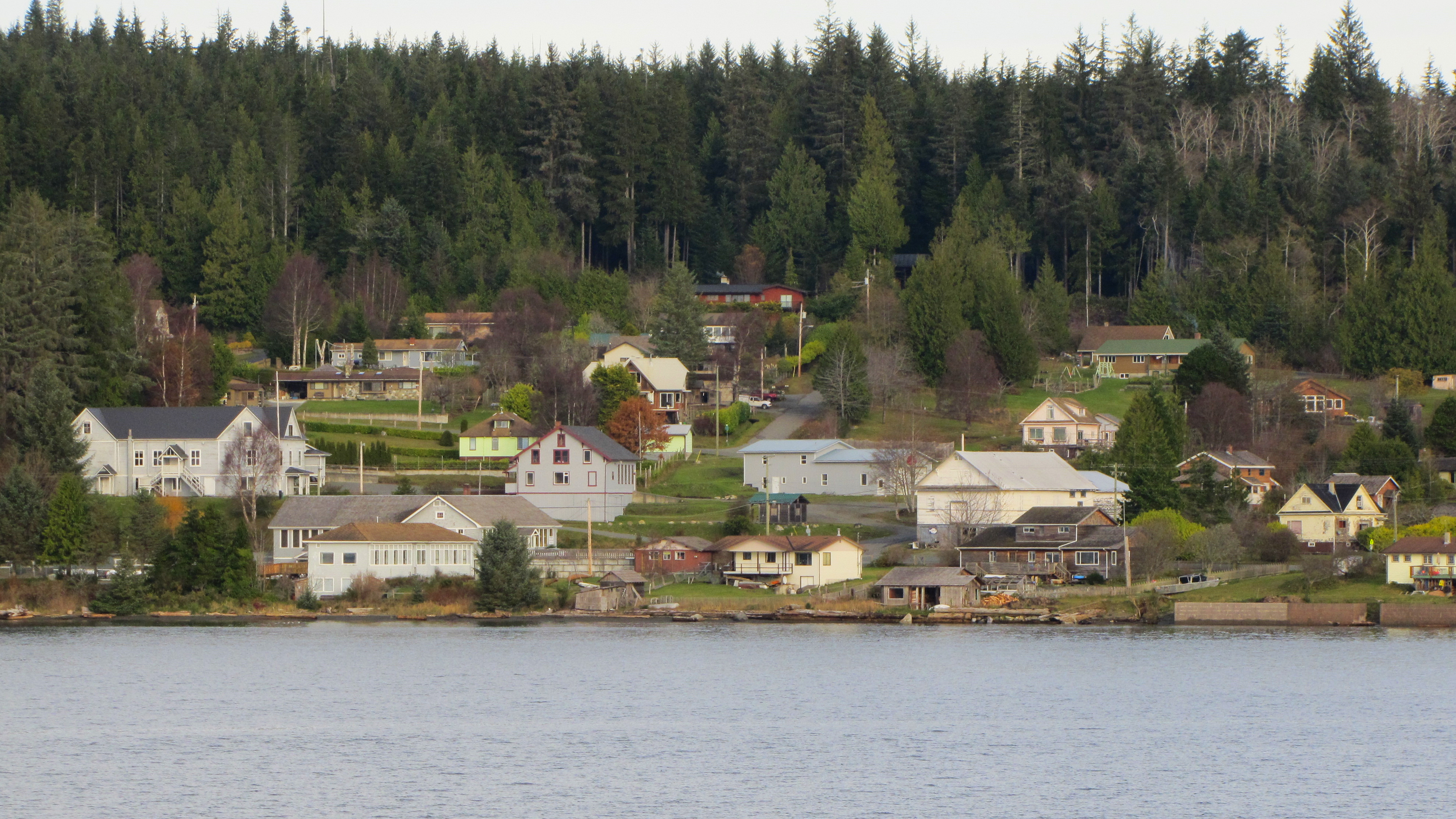

- Location in British Columbia
- Coordinates: 50°37′50″N 127°01′07″W
- Country: Canada
- Province: British Columbia
- Regional district: Mount Waddington

Population (2021)
  - Total: 513
- Time zone: UTC−07:00 (PT)
- Area code: 250
- Climate: Cfb

Sointula is an isolated village on Malcolm Island in British Columbia, Canada. Lying between Vancouver Island and the British Columbia mainland, northeast of Port McNeill and not far from Alert Bay, the island is part of the historic and present territory of the ‘Namgis First Nation. At the 2021 census, the village had a population of 513, down 0.8% from the 2016 census.

== History ==
The name Sointula means "Place of Harmony" (literally 'the place of chord') in the Finnish language. A group of Finnish settlers founded the village in 1901 after rowing north from Nanaimo. They set up a utopian socialist society known as the Kalevan Kansa, based on cooperative principles. and wrote to visionary Matti Kurikka in Finland to lead the new community. They were looking for a way out of the mines operated by the Dunsmuir family on Vancouver Island. It was a physically hard life, and a devastating fire in the Sointula community hall in 1903 killed three adults and eight children almost bringing the fledgling community to its knees. Kalervo Oberg, a Finnish-Canadian anthropologist born in 1901, came with his family to Sointula in 1902, and they were caught in the fire of 1903. Two of his sisters died in the fire.

Financial difficulties continued to plague the group. They worked for free for two years on the Capilano Bridge project, and after that the Kalevan Kansa was disbanded as a utopian colony in 1905, but many of the community members remained on the island, as have their descendants.

The town remained and eventually prospered well into the 1970s as an unusually vibrant resource-based settlement. Fishing and logging activities have been the mainstay for the community. The early cooperative ventures led to other businesses that are still operating, planting seeds that are also alive today. The Sointula Cooperative Store, the oldest co-op shop in the province, still handles dry goods, groceries and fuel for the islanders. The shellfish cooperative, Malcolm Island Shellfish Coop (MISC), was involved in research on the feasibility of raising and selling abalone, but closed for financial reasons in 2006. It relocated the abalone to an area near Port McNeill donated by Orca Sand and Gravel.

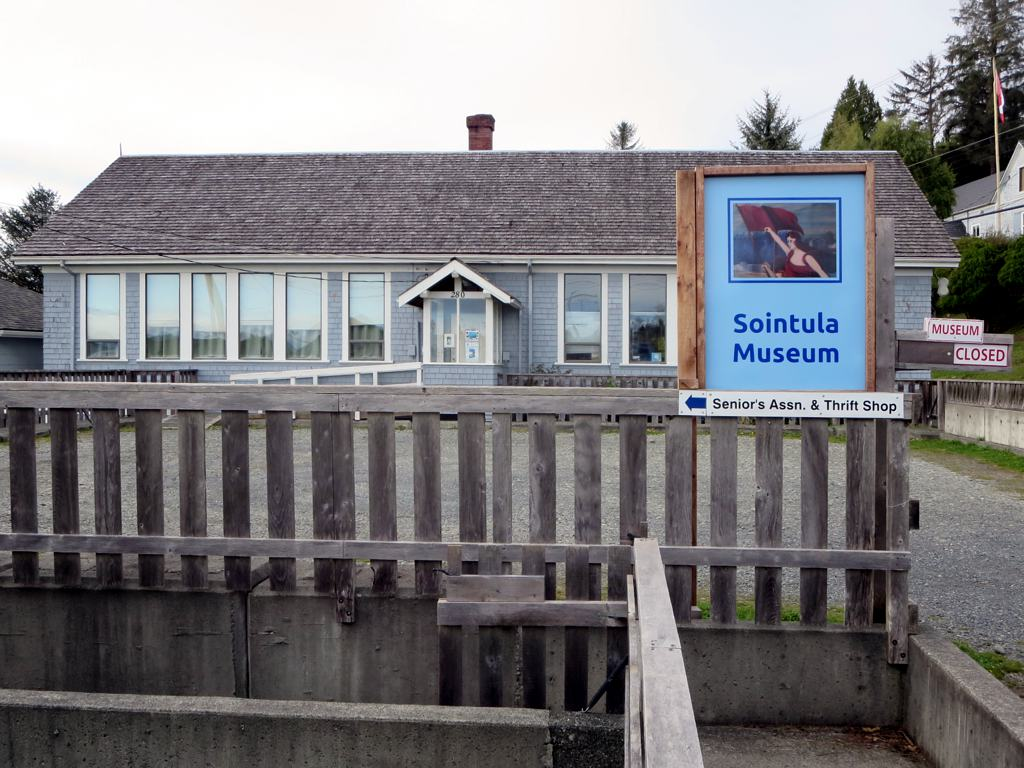
The Sointula Museum

In the 21st century, declining forestry and fishing industries have hit Sointula hard. Its school-age population has shrunk, although housing prices have risen, as owners from as far as California have bought homes as summer retreats. Sointula is home to the Sointula Museum, and produces an online newsletter, the Sointula Ripple. It is easy to reach by car ferry, operated by BC Ferries from Port McNeill and Alert Bay.

== Wildlife ==
Wildlife on the island and in the waters around it is abundant. Orcas return to the so-called "rubbing beaches" on Malcolm Island's northern edge near Bere Point Regional Park every summer and fall. Seals and porpoises can be viewed from the beaches. Birds, mink, otter, beaver, and deer live all over the island. The temperate rainforest vegetation helps to sustain the mood of an uncluttered and peaceful haven.

Sointula is the location of Living Oceans Society's head office, although it also has an office in Vancouver. Living Oceans Society, founded in 1998, is a non-profit research and public education organization committed to conserving marine biological diversity in order to ensure a healthy ocean and healthy coastal communities. It is Canada's largest non-governmental organization focused on marine conservation issues. In addition, a seasonal Canadian Coast Guard Inshore Rescue Boat Station is located in Sointula during the summer. The station is staffed by a coxswain and two crewmembers, using a Rigid Hull Inflatable Fast Rescue Craft.

== Legacy ==
Bill Gaston's novel Sointula (2004) is named for the community and has a plot that revolves in part around it. Rachel Lebowitz's book Hannus (2006) is also partly about the early days of the commune. Paula Wild's book Sointula gives a good overview of the island's ways and history. More recently, Sointula Museum, collaborating with the University of Victoria, has published Practical Dreamers, a history of the island's cooperatives complete with many historical pictures.

Sointula, and its original Finnish settlers, are the subject of a Finnish musical also named "Sointula", by Tuomo_Aitta; a Finnish theater company visited Sointula to perform it in 2013.

== See also ==
- Oulu, Wisconsin
- Sointula, Finland
