= Malcolm Island =

Island in British Columbia, Canada

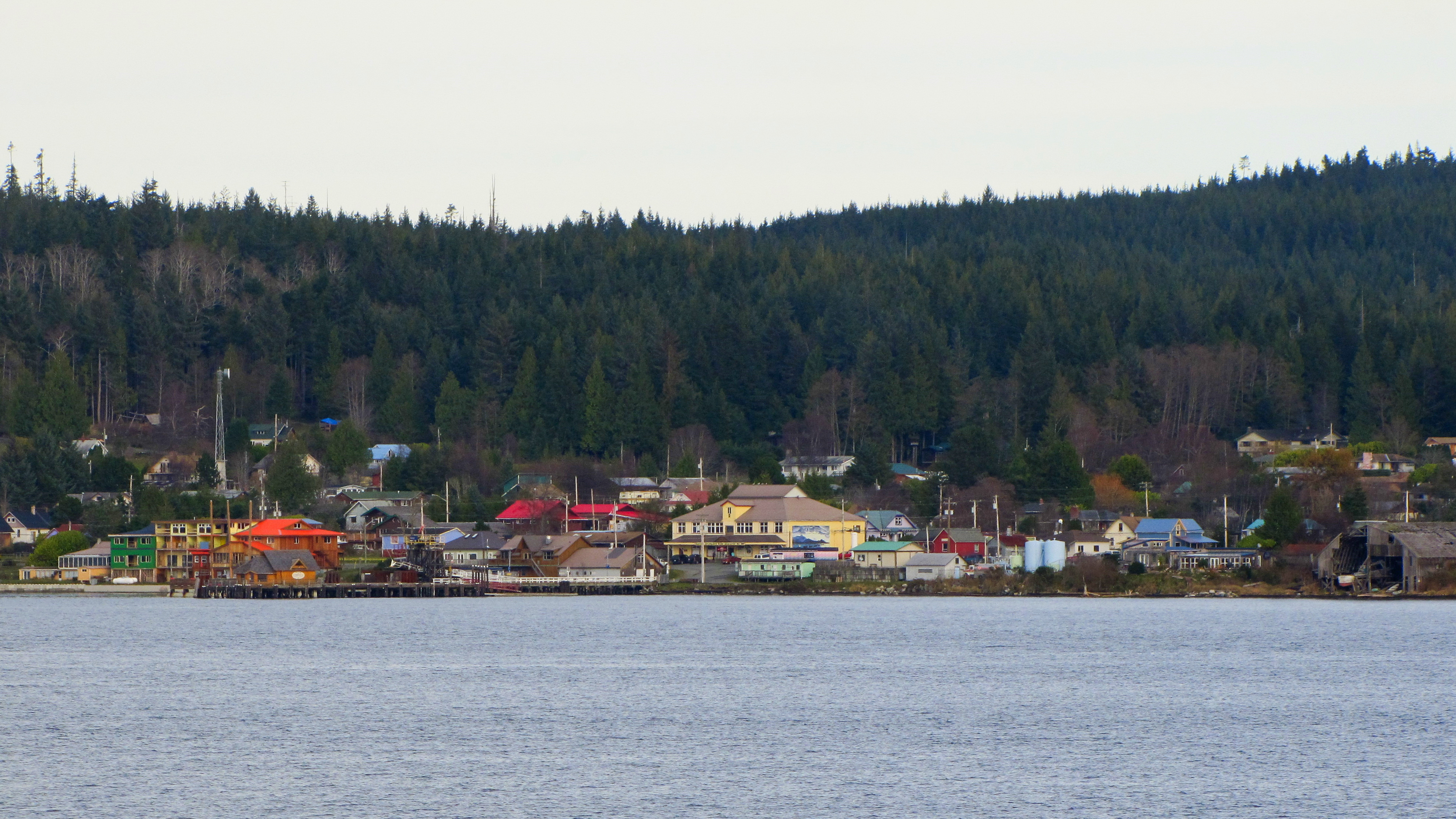
- The community of Sointula on Malcolm Island

- Location within British Columbia

Geography
- Coordinates: 50°38′37″N 126°59′33″W
- Adjacent to: Queen Charlotte Strait
- Area: 81.9 km^{2} (31.6 sq mi)
- Length: 24 km (14.9 mi)
- Width: 3 km (1.9 mi)
- Highest elevation: 189 m (620 ft)

Administration
- Canada
- Province: British Columbia
- Regional district: Mount Waddington

Demographics
- Population: 684 (2016)
- Pop. density: 8.4/km^{2} (21.8/sq mi)

Malcolm Island is an island along the northeast coastline of Vancouver Island in the Canadian province of British Columbia. Located in the Queen Charlotte Strait, it is separated from Vancouver Island by the Broughton Strait, with Haddington Island and Cormorant Island situated in the middle. It has ferry access from the Vancouver Island community of Port McNeill. The island is located within the Mount Waddington Regional District.

Malcolm Island has daily BC Ferry service for both vehicles and passengers. The ferry schedule is available at BCFerries.com, there are approximately 6 daily sailings.

The main community on Malcolm Island is Sointula.

Malcolm Island was named for Admiral Sir Pulteney Malcolm.
