= ʼNamgis First Nation =

First Nations government in British Columbia, Canada

The ʼNamgis First Nation (styled ʼNa̱mǥis) is a First Nations band government on northern Vancouver Island in British Columbia, Canada, and on adjoining islands in the southern Queen Charlotte Strait region.

The territory of the ʼNamgis First Nation spans the islands of the southern Queen Charlotte Strait (Malcolm Island and Cormorant Island), which include the town of Alert Bay and the former utopian community of Sointula, established by Finnish immigrants. Both communities are offshore across Broughton Strait from the town of Port McNeill, which is on Vancouver Island. The majority of ʼNamgis First Nation territory, however, spans the basin of the Nimpkish River and Nimpkish Lake and adjoining parts of the interior of northern Vancouver Island.

The main village of the ʼNamgis is ʼYalis, on Cormorant Island adjacent to Alert Bay. The original village site was at a place called Xwalkw on the north side of the mouth of the Nimpkish River, which in the Kwakʼwala language is called Gwani.

== Indian reserves ==
Indian reserves under the governance of the ʼNamgis First Nation are:

- Alert Bay IR No. 1, on the east shore of Alert Bay on Cormorant Island, 74.60 ha.
- Alert Bay IR No. 1A, a west portion of Cormorant Island, 161.60 ha.
- Ar-ce-wy-ee IR No. 4, on the left bank of the Nimpkish River, 3 miles south of its mouth, 16.70 ha.
- Ches-la-kee IR No. 3, at the mouth of the Nimpkish River, 118.20 ha.
- Ksui-la-das IR No. 6, on Ksuiladas Island, the most southerly of the Plumper Group of islands, 25.80 ha.
- Kuldekuma IR No. 7, on Kuldekuma Island, the most northerly of the Pearse Group just east of Cormorant Island, 22.0 ha.
- Nimpkish Indian Reserve No. 2, on Cormorant Island on the east shore of Alert Bay, south of Alert Bay IR No. 1, 2.70 ha.
- O-tsaw-las IR No. 5, on the right bank of the Nimpkish River, north of Nimpkish Lake, 20.40 ha.

== See also ==
- Alert Bay, British Columbia
- Kwakwakaʼwakw
