= Regional District of Mount Waddington =

Regional district in British Columbia, Canada

Mount Waddington
- Regional district
- Regional District of Mount Waddington
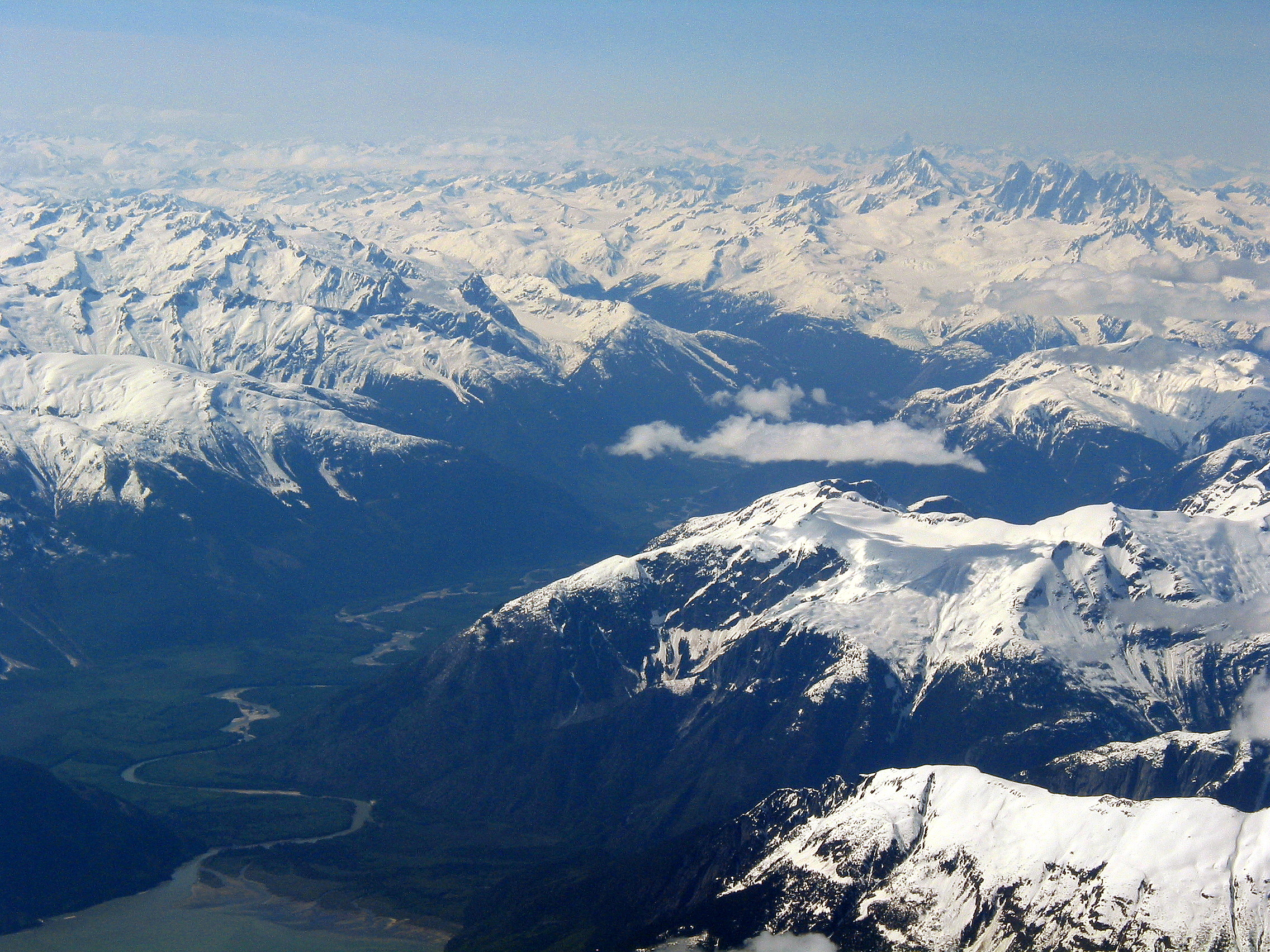
- Mount Waddington

- Location in British Columbia
- Country: Canada
- Province: British Columbia
- Administrative office location: Port McNeill

Government
  - Type: Regional district
  - Body: Board of directors
  - Chair: Andrew Hory (B)
  - Vice chair: Gaby Wickstrom (Port McNeill)
  - Electoral areas: A; B; C; D

Area
  - Land: 20,244.27 km^{2} (7,816.36 sq mi)

Population (2021)
  - Total: 10,839
  - Density: 0.535/km^{2} (1.39/sq mi)
- Website: www.rdmw.bc.ca

The Regional District of Mount Waddington (RDMW) is a regional district in British Columbia. It takes in the lower Central Coast region centred on the Queen Charlotte Strait coast of northern Vancouver Island and the adjoining parts of mainland British Columbia. It has a total land area of 20,288.4 km^{2} (7,833.4 sq mi) and a 2016 census population of 11,035 people, most of which is in towns on Vancouver Island and adjoining islands. The administrative centre is in the town of Port McNeill. Other municipalities include the district municipality of Port Hardy, the village of Port Alice, and the village of Alert Bay.

== Demographics ==
As a census division in the 2021 Census of Population conducted by Statistics Canada, the Regional District of Mount Waddington had a population of 10,839 living in 4,876 of its 5,743 total private dwellings, a change of −1.8% from its 2016 population of 11,035. With a land area of 20,186.47 km^{2} (7,794.04 sq mi), it had a population density of 0.5/km^{2} (1.4/sq mi) in 2021.

Panethnic groups in the Mount Waddington Regional District (1996−2021)
Panethnic group	2021		2016		2011		2006		2001		1996	
Panethnic group	Pop.	%	Pop.	%	Pop.	%	Pop.	%	Pop.	%	Pop.	%
European (Note: Statistic includes all persons that did not make up part of a visible minority or an indigenous identity.)	7,075	66.06%	7,070	65.04%	7,935	69.79%	8,530	73.41%	10,245	78.3%	11,545	79.13%
Indigenous	3,135	29.27%	3,340	30.73%	3,045	26.78%	2,730	23.49%	2,570	19.64%	2,460	16.86%
Southeast Asian (Note: Statistic includes total responses of "Filipino" and "Southeast Asian" under visible minority section on census.)	150	1.4%	125	1.15%	130	1.14%	60	0.52%	50	0.38%	155	1.06%
East Asian (Note: Statistic includes total responses of "Chinese", "Korean", and "Japanese" under visible minority section on census.)	145	1.35%	150	1.38%	55	0.48%	150	1.29%	120	0.92%	235	1.61%
South Asian	70	0.65%	25	0.23%	60	0.53%	40	0.34%	30	0.23%	40	0.27%
Middle Eastern (Note: Statistic includes total responses of "West Asian" and "Arab" under visible minority section on census.)	20	0.19%	10	0.09%	0	0%	25	0.22%	0	0%	0	0%
Latin American	55	0.51%	55	0.51%	65	0.57%	30	0.26%	15	0.11%	40	0.27%
African	40	0.37%	80	0.74%	25	0.22%	30	0.26%	30	0.23%	70	0.48%
Other (Note: Statistic includes total responses of "Visible minority, n.i.e." and "Multiple visible minorities" under visible minority section on census.)	15	0.14%	15	0.14%	45	0.4%	20	0.17%	50	0.38%	35	0.24%
Total responses	10,710	98.81%	10,870	98.5%	11,370	98.82%	11,620	99.73%	13,085	99.8%	14,590	99.92%
Total population	10,839	100%	11,035	100%	11,506	100%	11,651	100%	13,111	100%	14,601	100%

- Note: Totals greater than 100% due to multiple origin responses.

== Municipalities ==
- Alert Bay
- Port Alice
- Port Hardy
- Port McNeill

== Geography ==
The region is named for Mount Waddington, which lies on its northeastern boundary and is the highest peak entirely within British Columbia (Fairweather Mountain, on the Alaska boundary, is the highest). Also within the regional district is Silverthrone Mountain, the highest volcano in Canada, located in the remote Ha-Iltzuk Icefield. The eastern land boundary of the regional district is largely the divide of the Coast Mountains, inland from which is the Chilcotin District, which is part of the Cariboo Regional District. The northern land boundary with the Central Coast Regional District follows a watershed boundary, separating streams that flow into Queen Charlotte Sound north of Cape Caution from those that flow into the Sound to the south or that flow into Queen Charlotte Strait.

The RDMW is relatively underpopulated in comparison to other regional districts, due largely to the fact that most of its land area is rugged mountainscape or remote islands. Within its boundaries are the traditional territories of the Kwakwaka'wakw, who form a significant minority in the region and are the majority in many smaller communities. Band governments and reserve lands are not part of the governance system of the regional district, which is formed of the mayors of the towns and representatives from its electoral areas (though First Nations people living inside municipalities are eligible voters). Sointula, on Malcolm Island, is a historic Finnish Canadian settlement which began life as a cooperative; a similar Danish experiment at Cape Scott was a failure, although the Danish name Holberg remains in the area. Logging and fishing and associated transport and other services, in addition to tourism, are the mainstays of the economic life of the communities of the regional district.

== See also ==
- Mount Waddington
