= Alert Bay =

- Village
- The Corporation of the Village of Alert Bay
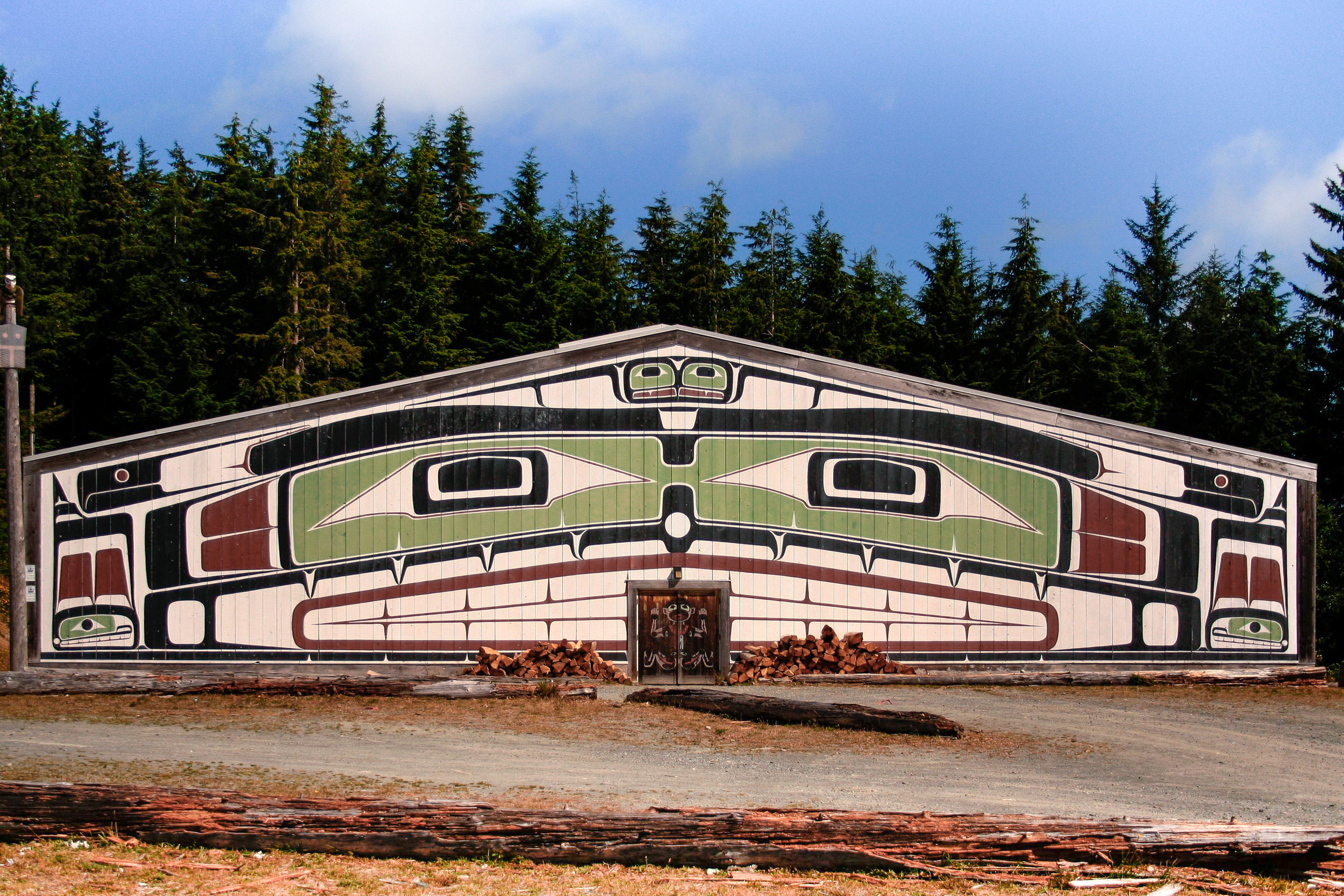
- The big house near Alert Bay.

- Location within British Columbia Alert Bay (Canada)
- Coordinates: 50°35′02″N 126°55′40″W
- Country: Canada
- Province: British Columbia
- Region: British Columbia Coast
- Regional district: Mount Waddington
- Incorporated: 1946

Government
  - Governing body: Alert Bay Village Council: Casey Chapman; Kane Gordon; Lisanne Granger; Sandra McGregor
  - Mayor: Dennis Buchanan
  - MP: Aaron Gunn
  - MLA: Anna Kindy

Area (2021)
  - Total: 1.69 km^{2} (0.65 sq mi)
- Elevation At the weather station: 54.9 m (180 ft)

Population (2021)
  - Total: 449
  - Density: 265.7/km^{2} (688/sq mi)
- Time zone: UTC−07:00 (PT)
- Highways: BC Ferries to Port McNeill and Sointula
- Waterways: Johnstone Strait, Broughton Strait, Cormorant Channel
- Climate: Cfb
- Website: alertbay.ca

Alert Bay, also known as ʼYalis in Kwakʼwala, is a village on Cormorant Island, near the town of Port McNeill on northeast Vancouver Island, in the Regional District of Mount Waddington, British Columbia, Canada.

== Demographics ==
In the 2021 Canadian census conducted by Statistics Canada, Alert Bay had a population of 449 living in 219 of its 266 total private dwellings, a change of −6.3% from its 2016 population of 479. With a land area of 1.69 km^{2} (0.65 sq mi), it had a population density of 265.7/km^{2} (688.1/sq mi) in 2021.

Up to half of the village's residents are First Nations people. The village is in traditional Kwakwakaʼwakw territory. Two Indian Reserves take up the rest of Cormorant Island, Alert Bay 1 on the east side of the island, Alert Bay 1A on the west.

== Facilities and features ==
Alert Bay has a credit union, grocery store, museums, a traditional "big house", a hospital, a Royal Canadian Mounted Police station, a drug store, a post office, four restaurants and retail gift shops, a BC liquor store, a Royal Canadian Legion, a pub, doctors' offices, a drug and alcohol treatment centre, and three automated teller machines (one in the bank, one outside the drug store and one outside Bayside Pub).

The town has two airports (Alert Bay Airport, and the Alert Bay Water Aerodrome). There is a boat harbour and a BC Ferries terminal with service to Sointula and Port McNeill.

There is Alert Bay Elementary School, part of School District 85 Vancouver Island North, for children in kindergarten and grades 1 to 7 and the T'lisalagi'lakw School (independent) owned and operated by the ʼNamgis First Nation for children in nursery, kindergarten and grades 1 to 7. Students in grades 8 to 12 travel by foot or ferry / water taxi to a school in nearby Port McNeill on Vancouver Island, along with students from Sointula on nearby Malcolm Island and others on North Island.

Alert Bay has a campground, located on Alder Road.

Alert Bay Ecological Park, formerly known as Gator Gardens, consists of boardwalks over a marsh and some forest trails. Cedar, pine, and hemlock trees populate the marsh. Many of the trees in the park are covered in Witch's Hair lichen. The water in the marsh comes from an underground fresh water spring. A dam was built in 1886 to collect fresh water for a fish cannery, and the resulting flooding of fresh water killed the trees in this area. The resulting cedar snags are a distinctive feature of this marshy area.

Alert Bay was home to the world's tallest totem pole, which represented unity between the local Indigenous nations. It was raised in 1973 and taken down in 2026 due to foundational instability caused by natural decay.

== U'mista Cultural Centre ==
In 1921, the Government of Canada, in an effort to stop the potlatch custom of dance, song, and wealth distribution under Section 116 of the Indian Act, confiscated many items including wooden masks, copper shields, and dance regalia. During the 1970s and 80s, the Kwakwakaʼwakw regained their possessions after long negotiations. The returned artifacts are housed in a museum at the U'mista Cultural Centre.

== Origin of the name ==
The settlement was named c.1860 after the Royal Navy ship HMS Alert, which conducted survey operations in the area.

== Climate ==
Alert Bay has an oceanic climate (Köppen Cfb) with a strong drying tendency in summer. Alert Bay is heavily moderated by the proximity to the Pacific Ocean and being located in the pathway of low-pressure systems from said ocean, heavy annual rainfall ensues. Winter is the wettest season, but snowfall is rare due to the average lows above freezing.

Climate data for Alert Bay Climate ID: 1020270; coordinates 50°35′N 126°56′W; elevation: 59.4 m (195 ft); 1971–2000 normals
Month	Jan	Feb	Mar	Apr	May	Jun	Jul	Aug	Sep	Oct	Nov	Dec	Year
Record high humidex	13.6	16.1	19.5	23.3	38.9	30.6	35.0	35.1	29.5	31.8	18.3	14.4	38.9
Record high °C (°F)	13.9 (57.0)	16.7 (62.1)	18.7 (65.7)	23.5 (74.3)	35.2 (95.4)	30.0 (86.0)	29.4 (84.9)	33.3 (91.9)	27.9 (82.2)	23.9 (75.0)	17.8 (64.0)	15.6 (60.1)	35.2 (95.4)
Mean daily maximum °C (°F)	5.4 (41.7)	6.8 (44.2)	8.9 (48.0)	11.3 (52.3)	14.1 (57.4)	15.7 (60.3)	17.9 (64.2)	18.2 (64.8)	16.1 (61.0)	11.9 (53.4)	7.5 (45.5)	5.6 (42.1)	11.6 (52.9)
Daily mean °C (°F)	3.5 (38.3)	4.4 (39.9)	5.8 (42.4)	7.6 (45.7)	10.1 (50.2)	12 (54)	14 (57)	14.3 (57.7)	12.3 (54.1)	9 (48)	5.4 (41.7)	3.7 (38.7)	8.5 (47.3)
Mean daily minimum °C (°F)	1.5 (34.7)	2 (36)	2.6 (36.7)	3.9 (39.0)	6.1 (43.0)	8.3 (46.9)	10 (50)	10.4 (50.7)	8.4 (47.1)	6 (43)	3.3 (37.9)	1.7 (35.1)	5.4 (41.7)
Record low °C (°F)	−11.1 (12.0)	−13.6 (7.5)	−7.8 (18.0)	−1.7 (28.9)	0.0 (32.0)	2.2 (36.0)	1.1 (34.0)	5.6 (42.1)	1.1 (34.0)	−3.9 (25.0)	−12.6 (9.3)	−13.3 (8.1)	−13.6 (7.5)
Record low wind chill	−21.5	−26.5	−22.0	−4.0	0.0	0.0	0.0	0.0	0.0	−9.2	−24.8	−23.0	−26.5
Average precipitation mm (inches)	209.2 (8.24)	147.7 (5.81)	125.6 (4.94)	94.5 (3.72)	73.7 (2.90)	81 (3.2)	50.5 (1.99)	65.4 (2.57)	91.3 (3.59)	191.4 (7.54)	251.5 (9.90)	209.6 (8.25)	1,591.5 (62.66)
Average rainfall mm (inches)	189.3 (7.45)	134.7 (5.30)	116.7 (4.59)	93 (3.7)	73.7 (2.90)	81 (3.2)	50.5 (1.99)	65.4 (2.57)	91.3 (3.59)	191 (7.5)	244.2 (9.61)	195.9 (7.71)	1,526.6 (60.10)
Average snowfall cm (inches)	20.7 (8.1)	13.1 (5.2)	8 (3.1)	1.3 (0.5)	0 (0)	0 (0)	0 (0)	0 (0)	0 (0)	0.4 (0.2)	6.6 (2.6)	12.5 (4.9)	62.6 (24.6)
Average precipitation days (≥ 0.2 mm.)	20.5	18.1	19.5	17.7	17	15.6	12.5	12.5	14.5	19.8	22.2	21.7	211.8
Average rainy days (≥ 0.2 mm.)	18.3	17	18.8	17.7	17	15.6	12.5	12.5	14.5	19.7	21.7	20.4	205.5
Average snowy days (≥ 0.2 cm)	4.6	3.4	2	0.52	0	0	0	0	0	0.1	1.1	3.4	15.1
Source: Environment and Climate Change Canada Canadian Climate Normals 1971–2000

== Geology ==
Volcanic features in the geography around Alert Bay are part of the Alert Bay Volcanic Belt. It appears to have been active in Miocene and Pliocene times. No Holocene eruptions are known, and volcanic activity in the belt has likely ceased.

== Notable people ==
- Gloria Cranmer Webster (1931–2023) – activist and writer
- Brothers Bing Chew Wong and Frank Bing Wong – Chinese Canadian Second World War veterans raised in Alert Bay and Vancouver; Bing was a Vancouver accountant who helped Chinese and First Nations clients with accounting needs.
