= Cormorant Island (British Columbia) =

Island in the country of Canada

Coordinates: 50°35′00″N 126°55′00″W

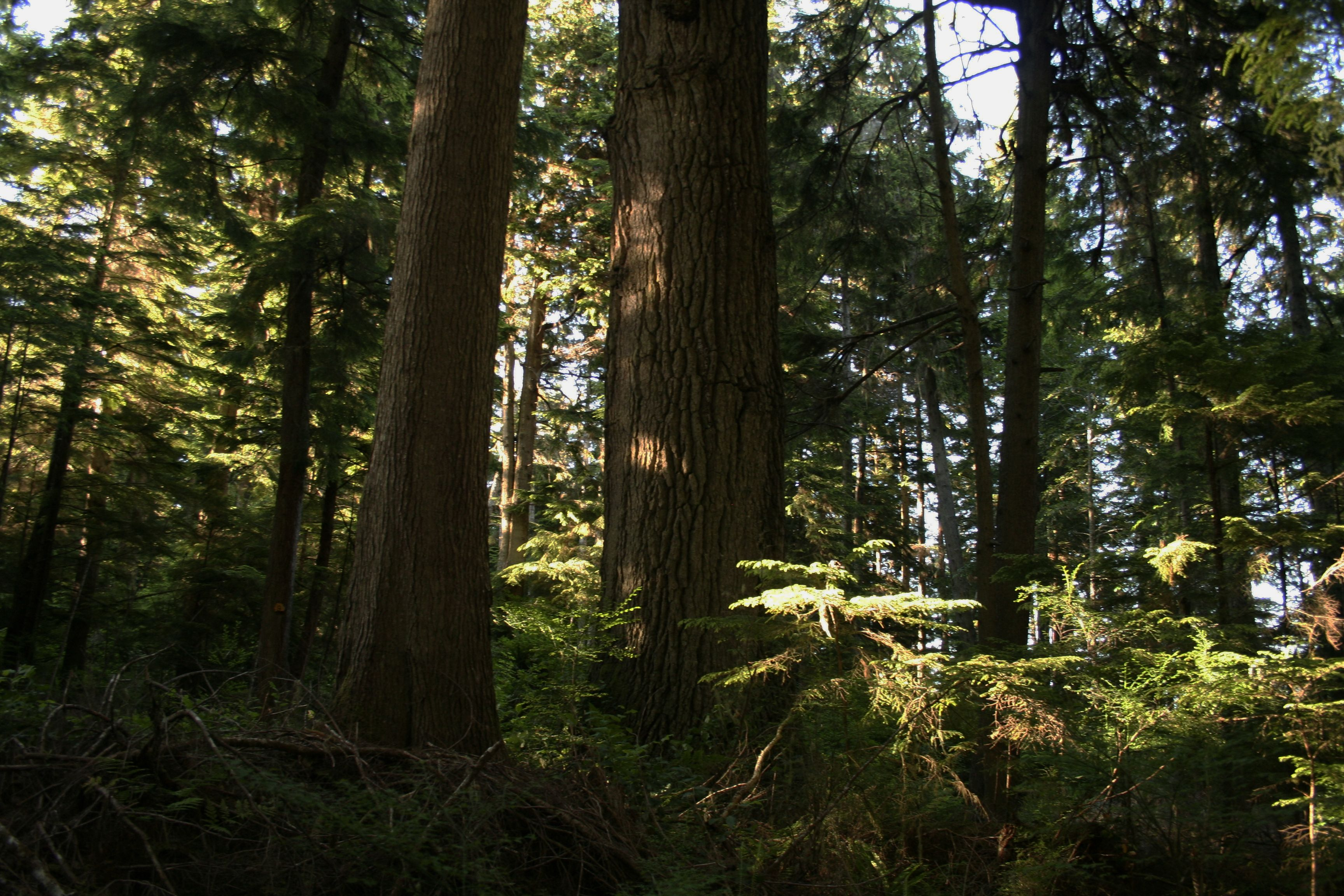
Cormorant Island is heavily forested.

Cormorant Island is an island in Queen Charlotte Strait on the Central Coast of British Columbia, Canada. It has a total land area of about 4 square km and is located south of Malcolm Island and east of Port McNeill.

Approximately 954 people (2016 census) live on the island, primarily in the village of Alert Bay and the 'Namgis First Nation. Approximately 60% of persons on the island live on one of the reserves, which together occupy about 30% of the island's land area.

The island is accessible by boat or by air. BC Ferries runs a passenger and car ferry between Cormorant Island, Malcolm Island, and Port McNeill which departs from Cormorant Island approximately every three hours during the day. There are two airports on the island: Alert Bay Water Aerodrome allows for access via floatplane, while Alert Bay Airport allows for conventional airplanes.

== Name origin ==
The island was named for the paddle sloop HMS Cormorant in 1846, by that vessel's commander, George T. Gordon. The Cormorant was assigned to the Royal Navy's Pacific Station from 1844 to 1850, and was the first naval steam vessel in the waters of the Pacific Northwest Coast.
