= Port McNeill =

- Town
- Town of Port McNeill
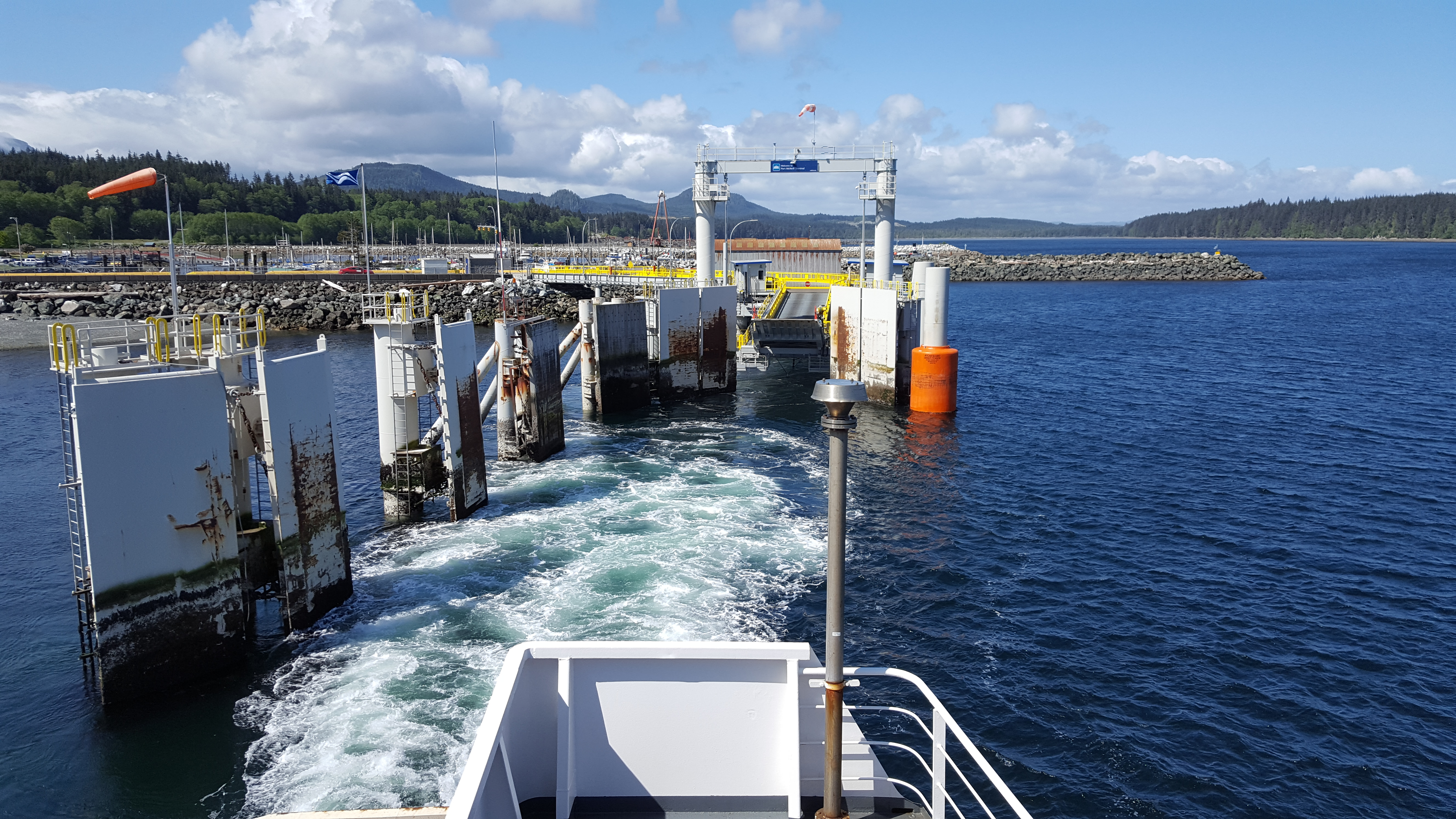

- Location within Vancouver Island Location within British Columbia
- Coordinates: 50°35′25″N 127°05′05″W
- Country: Canada
- Province: British Columbia
- Region: Vancouver Island
- Regional district: Mount Waddington
- Founded: 1936
- Incorporated: 1966

Government
  - Governing body: Port McNeill Town Council
  - Mayor: James Furney

Area
  - Total: 13.77 km^{2} (5.32 sq mi)
- Elevation: 10 m (33 ft)

Population (2021)
  - Total: 2,356
  - Density: 171.1/km^{2} (443.1/sq mi)
- Time zone: UTC−07:00 (PT)
- Postal code: V0N 2R0
- Area codes: 250, 778
- Highways: 19
- Waterways: Johnstone Strait, Queen Charlotte Strait
- Climate: Cfb
- Website: portmcneill.ca

Port McNeill is a town in the North Island region of Vancouver Island, British Columbia, Canada on Vancouver Island's northeast shore, on Queen Charlotte Strait. Originally a base camp for loggers, it became a settlement in 1936. It was named after Captain William Henry McNeill of the Hudson's Bay Company.

== Demographics ==
In the 2021 Census of Population by Statistics Canada, Port McNeill's population was 2,356, living in 1,019 of its 1,111 total private dwellings, 0.8% higher than its 2016 population of 2,337. With a land area of 13.77 km^{2} (5.32 sq mi), it had a population density of 171.1/km^{2} (443.1/sq mi) in 2021.

=== Religion ===
According to the 2021 census, religious groups in Port McNeill included:

- Irreligion (1,545 persons or 65.9%)
- Christianity (730 persons or 31.1%)
- Buddhism (10 persons or 0.4%)

== Tourism and location ==
Along with housing the headquarters of the Regional District of Mount Waddington, Port McNeill is the gateway to the Broughton straight. It offers the only access to the villages of Alert Bay (Cormorant Island) and Sointula (Malcolm Island) via BC Ferries. Port McNeill Airport is five minutes to the south on highway 19.

The town is also a popular summer tourism destination. There is a large population of wildlife including black bear, cougar, elk and deer. The town has a museum and a history centred on the area's logging history.

== Other information ==
Logging remains the primary employer in Port McNeill, accounting for 25.7% of the labour force and contributing about 8% of the total BC timber harvest. The main contractors are Western Forest Products and LeMare Lake Logging. Port McNeill is also the home to the remains of the world's largest burl.

Orca Sand & Gravel LP, the largest sand and gravel quarry in the northern hemisphere, opened here in February 2007. Material is shipped via 70,000 tonne container ships to ports in California and Hawaii and via 7000 tonne barges to Vancouver.

Kwagis Power, owned by Brookfield Renewable Power and the 'Namgis First Nation, built a 45-megawatt hydroelectric facility on the Kokish River near Port McNeill. The Steelhead Society of B.C. and the Western Canada Wilderness Committee opposed the project. The project was finished in early 2014.

Port McNeill is the hometown of Willie Mitchell, a former NHL defenceman, and the birthplace of former NHL defenceman Clayton Stoner. It is also the hometown of Thomas Symons, Canada's rookie representation at the 2022 STIHL World Timbersports Championship, which began May 27 in Vienna, Austria.

The first, second and fourth seasons of the History channel television show Alone were filmed in the forest outside Port McNeill. The third season filmed in Patagonia and featured local resident Megan Hanacek.
