= List of dolphinariums =

This is a non-exhaustive list of known dolphinariums worldwide. Many of these places are more than just dolphinariums; the list includes themeparks, marine mammal parks, zoos or aquariums that may also have more than one species of dolphin. The current status of parks marked with an asterisk (*) is unknown; these parks may have closed down, moved, changed names or no longer house any dolphins. Due to the large number of facilities worldwide, this list may not be complete. Facilities only housing porpoises are not listed.

Though Egypt and Russia are transcontinental countries, for the sake of keeping information together they have been listed under Africa and Europe respectively.

== Africa ==
=== South Africa ===
- uShaka Marine World

=== Tunisia ===
- Friguia Park

== East Asia ==
=== China mainland ===
- Beijing Aquarium
- Chengdu Haichang Polar Ocean World
- Chimelong Ocean Kingdom
- Grandview Mall Aquarium
- Nanjing Underwater World
- Shanghai Haichang Ocean Park
- Shenzhen Safari Park

=== Hong Kong ===
- Ocean Park Hong Kong

=== Japan ===
- Adventure World (Japan)
- Aqua World – Oarai, Ibaraki
- Asamushi Aquarium – Aomori, Aomori
- Inubōsaki Marine Park, Choshi
- Kamogawa Sea World
- Marine World Uminonakamichi
- Marinepia Matsushima Aquarium
- Notojima Aquarium
- Okinawa Churaumi Aquarium
- Osaka Aquarium Kaiyukan
- Aqua Park Shinagawa
- Notojima Aquarium
- Port of Nagoya Public Aquarium
- Sendai Umino-Mori Aquarium
- Toba Aquarium
- Yokohama Hakkeijima Sea Paradise
- Kagoshima Aquarium
- Umi Kirara Saikai National Park Aquarium

=== South Korea ===
- Aqua Planet Jeju
- Dolphinarium at Seoul Grand Park

=== Taiwan ===
- Yehliu Ocean World
- Farglory Ocean Park

== Europe ==
=== Belarus ===
- The Nemo dolphinarium in Minsk is located inside the Minsk Zoo

=== Belgium ===
- Boudewijn Seapark Dolphinarium, Bruges

=== Bulgaria ===
- Varna Dolphinarium

=== France ===
- Planète Sauvage
- Moorea dolphin center (InterContinental Moorea Resort & Spa, Moorea Island, French Polynesia)

=== Georgia ===
- Batumi dolphinarium

=== Germany ===
- Duisburg Zoo
- Nuremberg Zoo

=== Italy ===
- Aquarium of Genoa
- Oltremare
- Zoomarine

=== Lithuania ===
- Lietuvos jūrų muziejus

=== Malta ===
- Mediterraneo Marine Park

=== Netherlands ===
- Dolfinarium Harderwijk

=== Portugal ===
- Jardim Zoológico de Lisboa
- Zoomarine Algarve

=== Romania ===
- Delfinariu Constanța

=== Russia ===
- Moskvarium

=== Spain ===
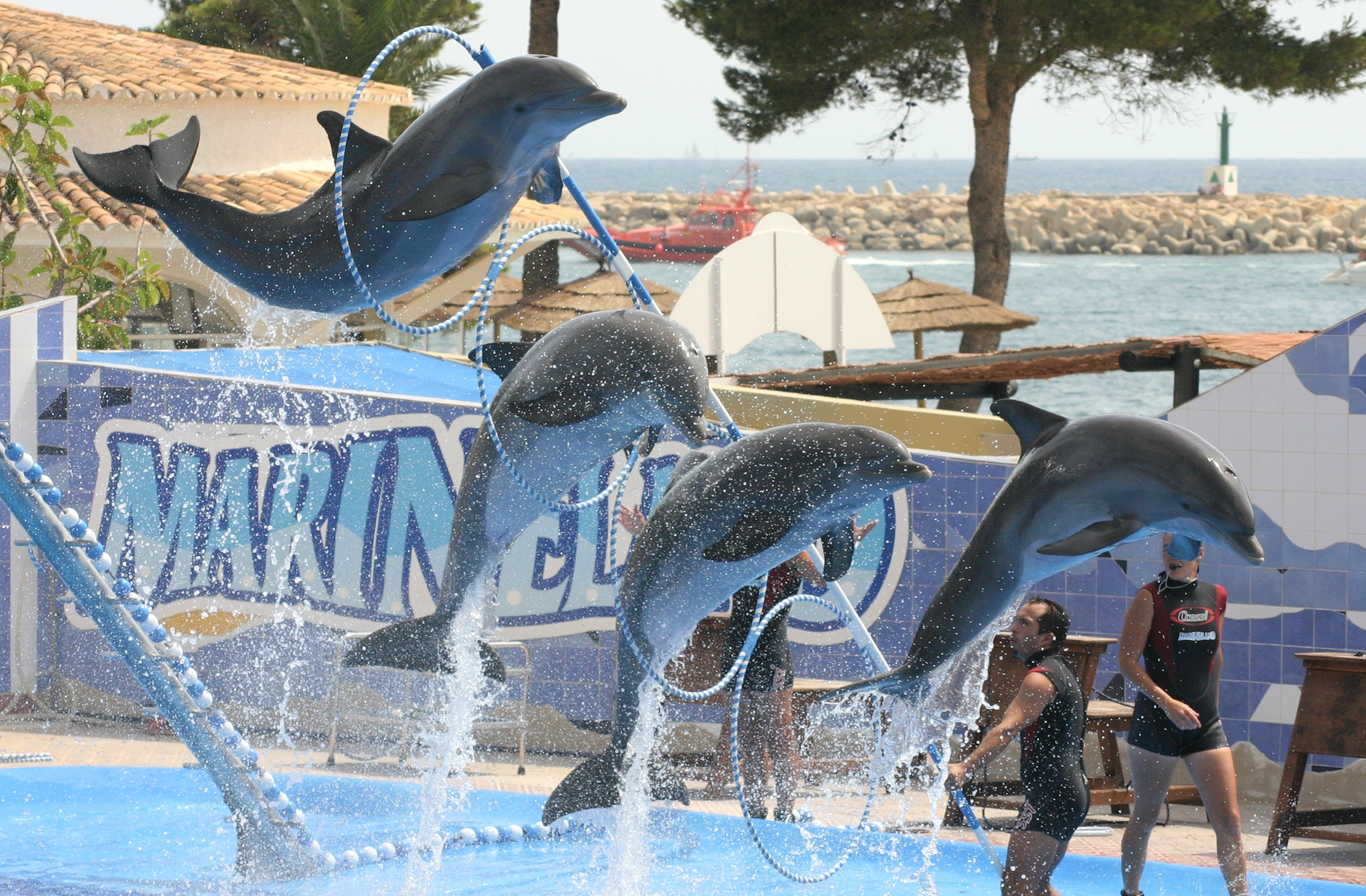
Bottlenose dolphins performing at Marineland Mallorca

- Aqualand, Costa Adeje, Tenerife
- Loro Parque, Tenerife
- Mundomar, Costa Blanca
- L'Oceanogràfic, Valencia
- Palmitos Park, Gran Canaria
- Marineland, Mallorca

=== Sweden ===
- Kolmården Wildlife Park, Bråviken bay

Ukraine

• Kharkiv Dolphinarium Nemo

https://nemo.kh.ua/

• Odesa Dolphinarium Nemo

https://www.nemo.od.ua/

== North America ==
=== Canada ===
- Marineland of Canada (defunct)

=== Mexico ===
- Delphinus Xcaret
- Delphinus Xel-Ha

=== United States ===
- Aquatica, Orlando
- Brookfield Zoo, Illinois
- Clearwater Marine Aquarium
- Discovery Cove
- Dolphin Research Center
- Georgia Aquarium
- Gulf World Marine Park
- Indianapolis Zoo
- Long Marine Laboratory / Institute of Marine Sciences

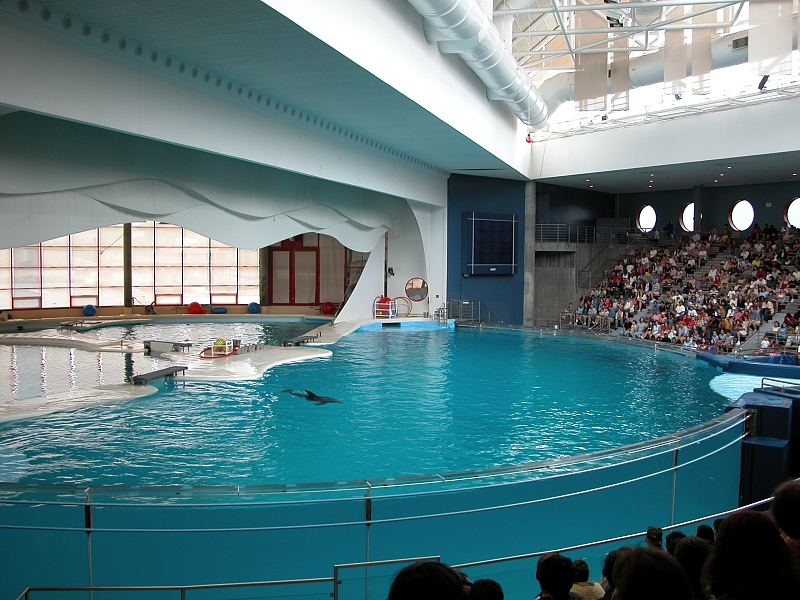
National Aquarium in Baltimore dolphinarium

- Marineland of Florida
- Miami Seaquarium
- Mississippi Aquarium
- Mystic Aquarium (only Beluga whales)*
- National Aquarium in Baltimore
- Sea Life Park Hawaii
- SeaWorld Orlando, Florida
- SeaWorld San Antonio, Texas
- SeaWorld San Diego, California
- Shedd Aquarium, Illinois
- Six Flags Marine World's Dolphin Harbor (also known as Merlin's Dolphin Harbor), Vallejo
- Texas State Aquarium
- Theater of the Sea
- Walt Disney World's The Seas with Nemo & Friends pavilion
- Ocean Adventures Marine Park, Mississippi
- Institute for Marine Mammal Studies, Mississippi

== Pacific ==
=== Australia ===
- Sea World
- Coffs Coast Wildlife Sanctuary

== South / Central America and the Caribbean ==
=== Argentina ===
- Mundo Marino

=== Bahamas ===
- Atlantis Paradise Island, Dolphin Cay
- Dolphin Encounters Blue Lagoon Island

=== Colombia ===
- Rodadero Sea Aquarium and Museum

=== Cuba ===
- Acuario Nacional de Cuba *
- Baconao Park
- Cayó Coco delfinarium

=== Jamaica ===
- Dolphin Cove Jamaica

== Southeast Asia ==
=== Indonesia ===
- Gelanggang Samudra at Ancol Dreamland

=== Philippines ===
- Misamis Occidental Aquamarine Park, Libertad Bago, Sinacaban, Misamis Occidental
- Ocean Adventure, Morong, Bataan

=== Singapore ===
- Dolphin Island at Resorts World Sentosa

=== Thailand ===
- Safari World dolphinarium, Bangkok
- Pattaya dolphinarium
- Oasis Seaworld,(Chantaburi)

== West Asia ==
=== Iran ===
- Aqua Lion, Namakabrood
- Dolphinarium, Tabriz
- Kish Island Dolphin Park, Kish Island
- Milad Tower Dolphinarium, Tehran

=== Israel ===
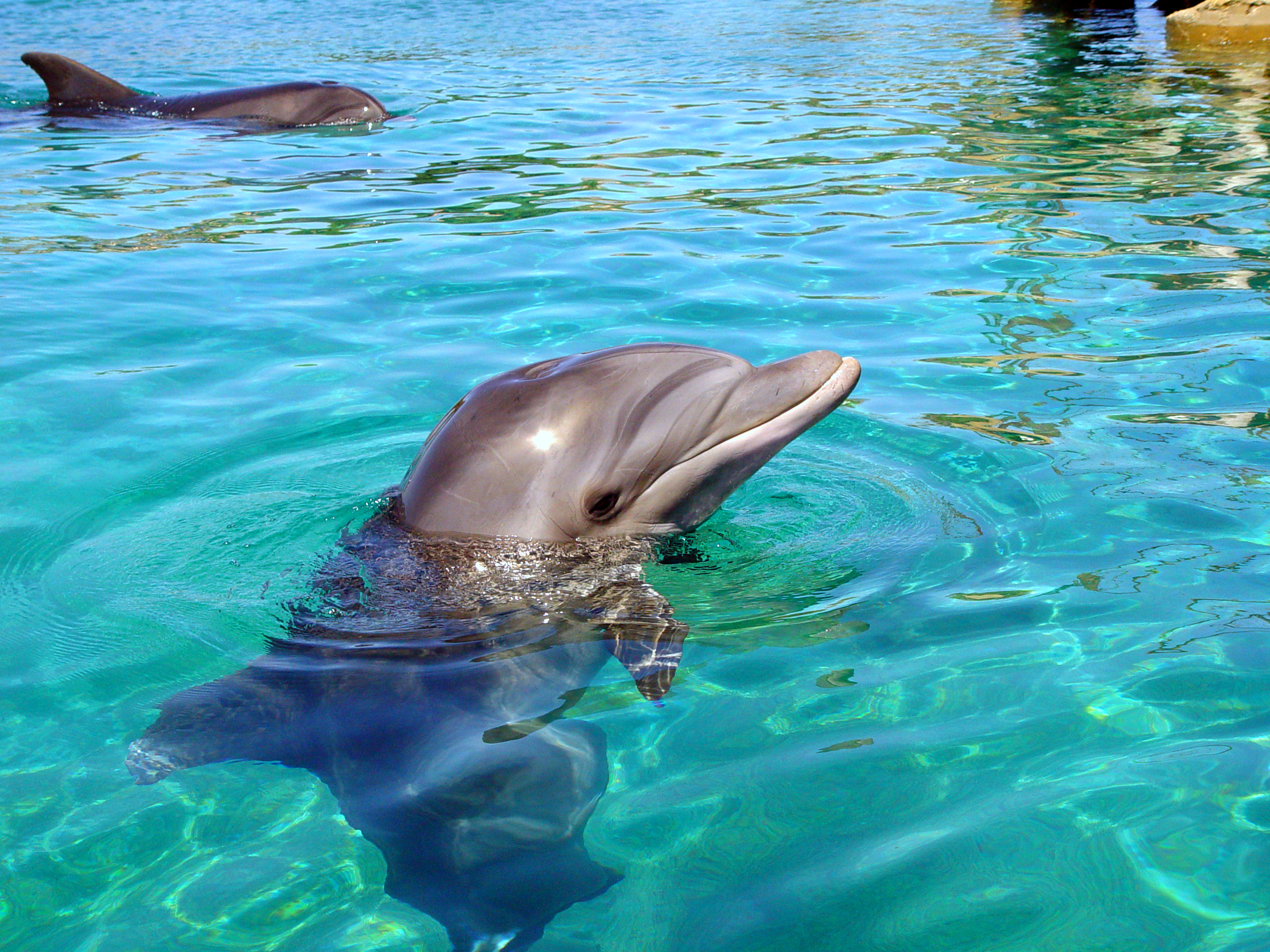
Dolphin at Dolphin Reef, Eilat

- Dolphin Reef, Eilat

=== United Arab Emirates ===
- Atlantis, The Palm (dolphin bay)
- Dubai Dolphinarium

Seaworld Abu Dhabi

== See also ==
- List of aquaria
- List of zoos
- List of captive orcas
