= Captivity (disambiguation) =

Captivity is a state wherein humans or other animals are confined to a particular space and prevented from leaving or moving freely.

Captivity may also refer to:

- Captivity (animal), the keeping of either domesticated animals (livestock and pets) or wild animals
- Captivity (film), a 2007 U.S.-Russia thriller film by Roland Joffe and starring Elisha Cuthbert
- Babylonian captivity of Judah, as described in the Bible
- HMS Captivity, two ships

== See also ==
- Babylonian captivity (disambiguation)
- Captive (disambiguation)
- The Captive (disambiguation)
- Captive company, a subsidiary
- Captivity narrative, genre of stories about people being captured by "uncivilized" enemies
- Hostage, a person or entity which is held by one of two belligerent parties
- Imprisonment, restraint of a person's liberty
