= Animal theme park =

Combination of a theme park and a zoo

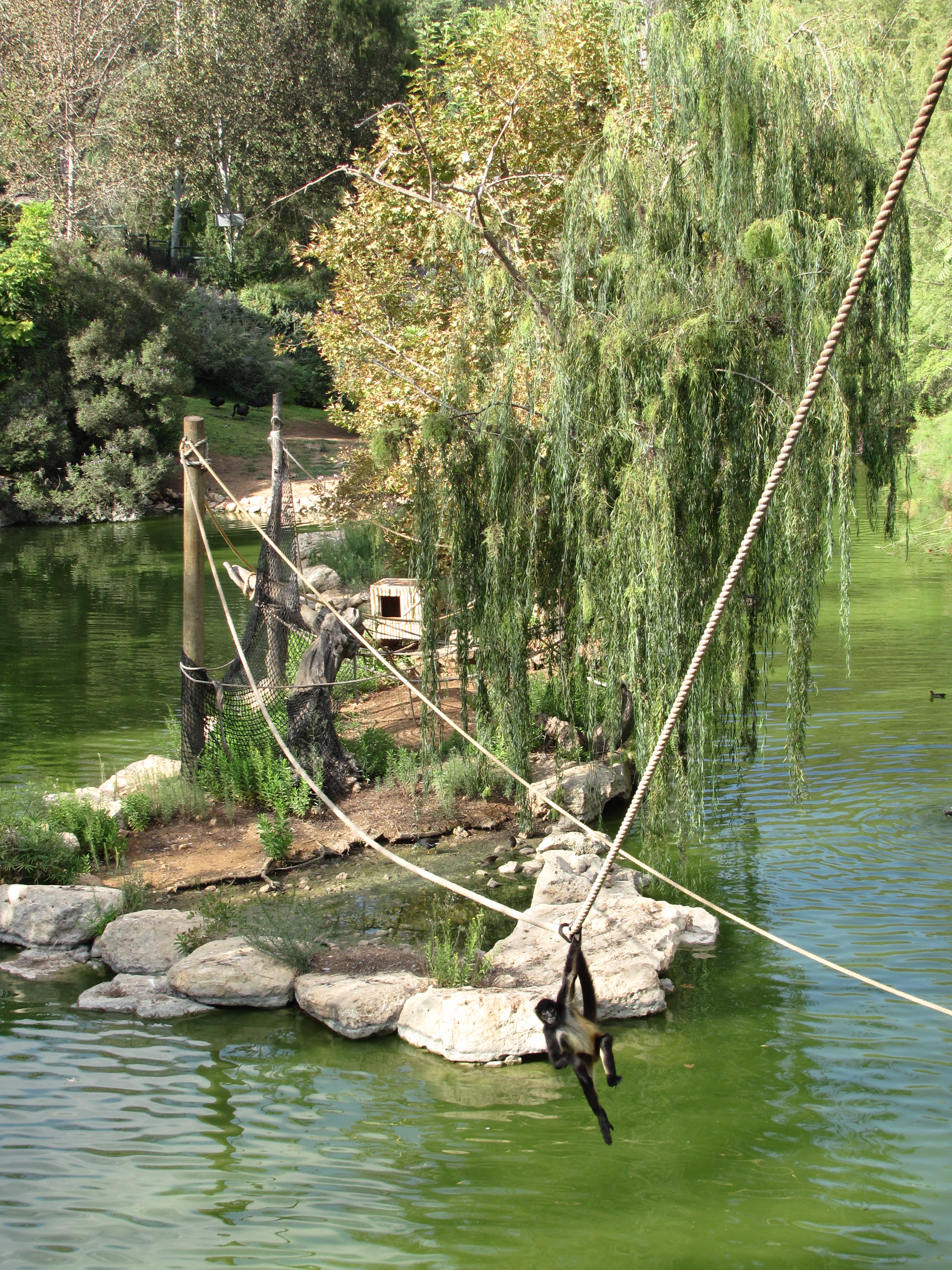
A black-handed spider monkey in the Jerusalem Biblical Zoo, Jerusalem

An animal theme park, also known as a zoological theme park, is a combination of an amusement park and a zoo, mainly for entertainment, amusement, and commercial purposes. Many animal theme parks combine classic theme park elements, such as themed entertainment and amusement rides, with classic zoo elements such as live animals confined within enclosures for display. Many times, live animals are utilized and featured as part of amusement rides and attractions found at animal theme parks.

Two examples of animal theme parks are Disney's Animal Kingdom in Orlando, Florida (580 acres or 2.3 square kilometres) and Busch Gardens Tampa Bay in Tampa, Florida (335 acres or 1.36 square kilometres). These commercial parks are similar to open-range zoos and safari parks according to size, but different in intention and appearance, containing more entertainment and amusement elements (stage shows, amusement rides, etc.).

The term "animal theme park" can also be used to describe certain marine mammal parks, oceanariums, and more elaborate dolphinariums, such as SeaWorld, which offers amusement rides and additional entertainment attractions, and are also where marine animals such as whales are kept, contained, put on display, and are sometimes trained to perform in shows.

In 2010 the practice of keeping animals as trained show performers in theme parks was heavily criticized when a trainer was killed by an orca whale at SeaWorld Orlando in Florida.

== List of animal theme parks ==
=== Zoological theme parks ===
- Adventure World in Wakayama, Wakayama Prefecture, Japan
- Bayern Park, Reisbach, Bavaria, Germany
- Bali Safari and Marine Park in Bali, Indonesia
- Beto Carrero World in Santa Catarina, Brazil
- Bellewaerde in Zonnebeke, Belgium
- Big Rivers Waterpark & Adventures, in New Caney, Texas
- Busch Gardens Tampa Bay in Tampa Bay, Florida
- Busch Gardens Williamsburg in Williamsburg, Virginia
- Chessington World of Adventures in Surrey, England
- Clark's Bears in Lincoln, New Hampshire
- Conny-Land in Lipperswil, Thurgau, Switzerland
- Debrecen Zoo and Amusement Park in Debrecen, Hungary
- Disney's Animal Kingdom in Lake Buena Vista, Florida
- Dreamworld in Gold Coast, Australia
- Drusillas Zoo Park in Alfriston, England
- Eifelpark, Gondorf, Rhineland-Palatinate, Germany
- Emerald Park in County Meath, Ireland
- Erlebnispark Tripsdrill in Cleebronn, Baden-Württemberg, Germany
- Flamingo Land in North Yorkshire, England
- Fun Spot America in Orlando, Florida
- Gatorland in Orlando, Florida
- Granby Zoo in Granby, Quebec
- Happy Hollow Park & Zoo in San Jose, California
- Hersheypark in Hershey, Pennsylvania
- Higashiyama Zoo and Botanical Gardens in Chikusa-ku, Nagoya, Japan
- Jaderpark in Wesermarsch, Lower Saxony, Germany
- Kalahari Resorts in Sandusky, Ohio
- Kemah Boardwalk in Kemah, Texas
- Knoebels in Elysburg, Pennsylvania
- Le Pal in Saint-Pourçain-sur-Besbre, France
- Leofoo Village Theme Park in Guanxi, Hsinchu, Taiwan
- Lion Country Safari in Loxahatchee, Florida
- Öland Zoo and Amusement Park in Färjestaden, Öland, Sweden
- Panorama-Park Sauerland Wildpark in Rinsecke, North Rhine-Westphalia, Germany
- Parc Safari in Hemmingford, Quebec
- Safariland Stukenbrock in Stukenbrock, North Rhine-Westphalia, Germany
- Santa's Village in Jefferson, New Hampshire
- Seregeti Park in Hodenhagen, Lower Saxony, Germany
- Six Flags Discovery Kingdom in Vallejo, California
- Six Flags Great Adventure in Jackson, New Jersey
- Taman Safari in Bogor, Indonesia
- Tier- und Freizeitpark Thüle near Friesoythe, Lower Saxony, Germany
- Tobu Zoo in Miyashiro, Saitama, Japan
- Wild Adventures in Valdosta, Georgia
- Wildlands Adventure Zoo Emmen in Emmen, Netherlands
- Wildlife World Zoo in Litchfield Park, Arizona
- Wild- und Freizeitpark Klotten in Klotten, Rhineland-Palatinate, Germany
- Wild- und Freizeitpark Willingen in Willingen (Upland), Hesse, Germany
- York's Wild Kingdom in York Beach, Maine

=== Marine theme parks (marine mammal parks and oceanariums) ===
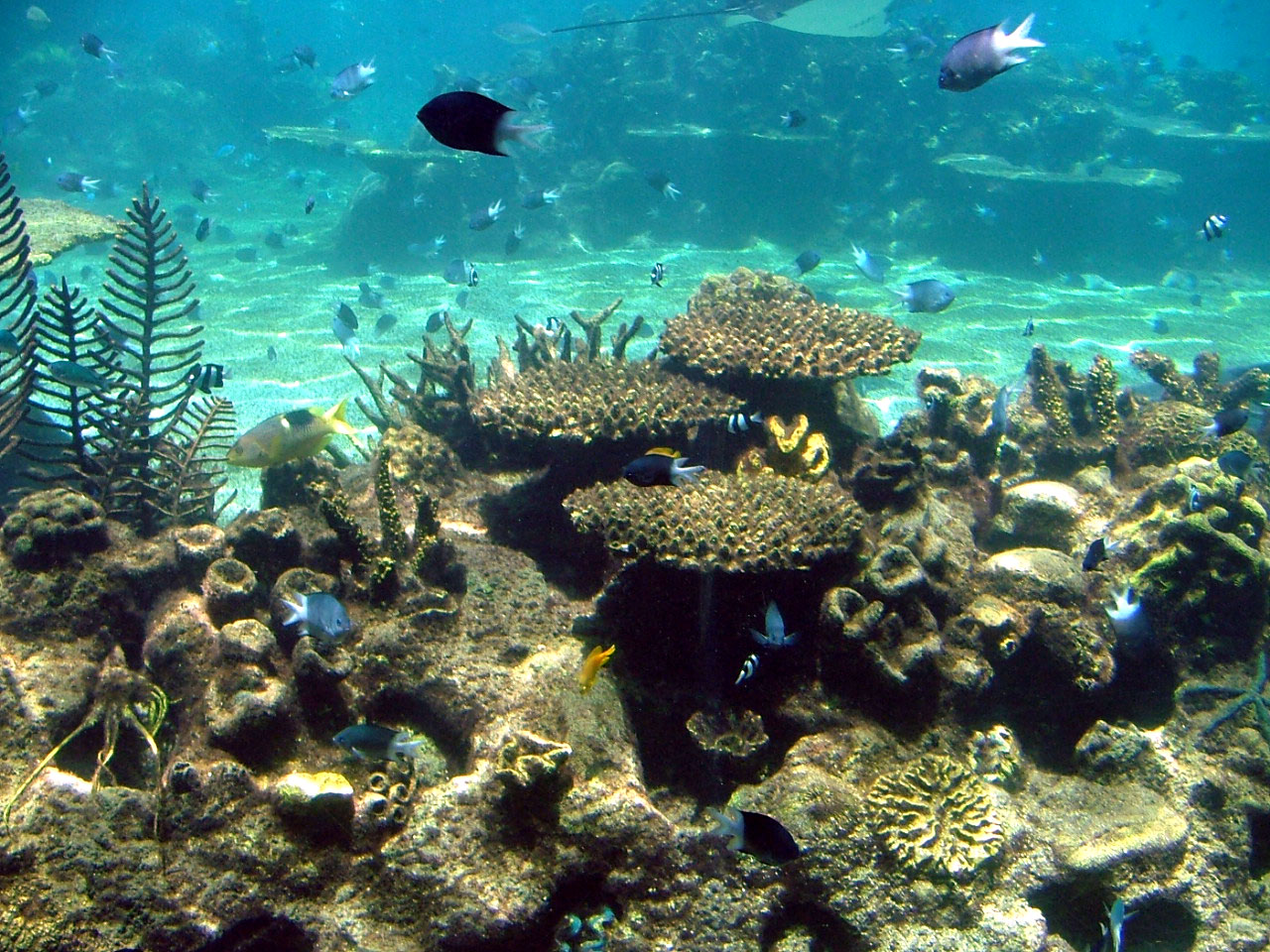
Sea World, Gold Coast, Australia

- Adventure World in Wakayama, Wakayama Prefecture, Japan
- Aquatica in Orlando, Florida and San Antonio, Texas
- Bali Safari and Marine Park in Bali, Indonesia
- Boudewijn Seapark in Sint-Michiels, Bruges, Belgium
- Conny-Land in Lipperswil, Thurgau, Switzerland
- Discovery Cove in Orlando, Florida
- Dolfinarium Harderwijk in Harderwijk, Netherlands
- Epcot in Walt Disney World, Lake Buena Vista, Florida
- Higashiyama Zoo and Botanical Gardens in Chikusa-ku, Nagoya, Japan
- Kemah Boardwalk in Kemah, Texas
- Legoland Deutschland in Günzburg, Germany
- Ocean Park Hong Kong in Hong Kong, China
- Sea World in Gold Coast, Australia
- SeaWorld San Antonio in San Antonio, Texas
- SeaWorld San Diego in San Diego, California
- SeaWorld Orlando in Orlando, Florida
- Six Flags Discovery Kingdom in Vallejo, California
- Story Land in Glen, New Hampshire
- Yokohama Hakkeijima Sea Paradise in Yokohama, Kanagawa Prefecture, Japan

=== Zoos with amusement attractions ===
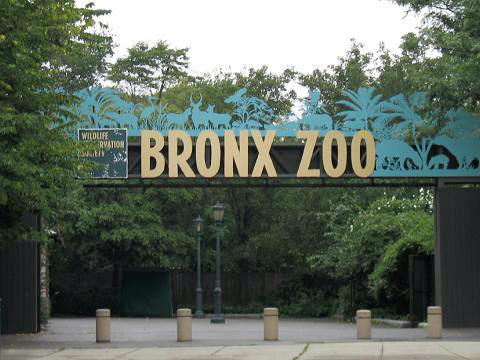
Bronx Zoo, New York City, United States

Most zoos have a carousel and/or Safari Train, but some zoos have more amusement attractions than that.

- Affen- und Vogelpark Eckenhagen in Reichshof, North Rhine-Westphalia, Germany
  - Features an indoor hall with playgrounds, carousels, trampolines, swing boats and a climbing wall
- Bronx Zoo in New York City
  - Features a monorail attraction, bug carousel, zip-line course, and obstacle course for children
- Chester Zoo in Upton-by-Chester, Cheshire, England
  - Features a tow boat ride
- Columbus Zoo and Aquarium in Powell, Ohio
  - Features a carousel, boat ride (like an Old Mill ride but entirely outside), North American Wilderness Train, 3D cinema, two children's playgrounds, and it is combined with Zoombezi Bay and Rides At Adventure Cove
- Fort Wayne Children's Zoo in Fort Wayne, Indiana
  - Features a jungle carousel, safari train, log ride (like a log flume but with no lift hills or splash drops), and safari sky ride
- Granby Zoo in Granby, Quebec
  - Features a pony ride, camel ride, monorail, 3D cinema, carousel, Ferris wheel, roller coaster, pirate ship, bumper cars, indoor kids' playground, and water park
- Hanover Zoo in Hanover, Lower Saxony, Germany
  - Features a tow boat ride
- Hovatter's Wildlife Zoo in Kingwood, West Virginia
  - Features a kiddie roller coaster, kiddie ferris wheel, and a kids' playground
- Idaho Falls Zoo at Tautphaus Park
  - Combined with Funland amusement park
- Kolmården Wildlife Park in Norrköping, Östergötland County, Sweden
  - Features three roller coasters, an aerial lift and a little amusement park themed after the cartoon character Bamse
- Loro Parque in Puerto de la Cruz, Tenerife, Spain
  - Features a kiddie roller coaster
- Metro Richmond Zoo in Chesterfield County, Virginia
  - Features a Safari Sky Ride, Jungle Carousel, Safari Train, kids' playground, and zip line
- Natur- und Tierpark Brüggen in Brüggen, North Rhine-Westphalia, Germany
  - Features a big playground with a monorail, a summer toboggan, a mini golf course and an electric horse riding track
- Oakland Zoo in Oakland, California
  - Features a Jungle Carousel, doughnut ride, plane ride, safari jeep ride, sky ride, Outback Train, family roller coaster, and kids' playground
- San Diego Zoo in San Diego, California
  - Features a "Sky Safari" attraction, motion simulator experience, and double decker bus tour
- San Diego Zoo Safari Park in Escondido, California
  - Features a safari vehicular tour, hot air balloon experience, jungle carousel, and zip line course
- Singapore Zoo in Singapore
  - Features a vehicular tour, jungle carousel, pony ride, horse carriage ride, kids' playground, and water park
- Toledo Zoo in Toledo, Ohio
  - Features a Jungle Carousel, Safari Train, kids' playground, splash pad, and obstacle course
- Wild- & Erlebnispark Daun in Daun, Rhineland-Palatinate, Germany
  - Features an 800 m-long (2,600 ft) summer toboggan and a playground
- Wild- und Freizeitpark Ostrittrum in Ostrittrum, Lower Saxony, Germany
  - Features a fairytale forest, two playgrounds, a lake with paddle boats and a local museum
- Zoo Miami in Miami, Florida
  - Features a camel ride, kids’ playground, splash pad, monorail, and flume ride.
- ZOOM Erlebniswelt Gelsenkirchen in Gelsenkirchen, North Rhine-Westphalia, Germany
  - Features a simulator ride, a tow boat ride and a huge indoor playground
- ZooTampa at Lowry Park in Tampa, Florida
  - Features a Shoot the Chute, jungle carousel, family roller coaster, bus tour, Outback Train, and miscellaneous rides for young children

== See also ==
- Marine mammal park
- List of amusement parks
