= Sea-Arama Marineworld =

Marine park in Texas, U.S.

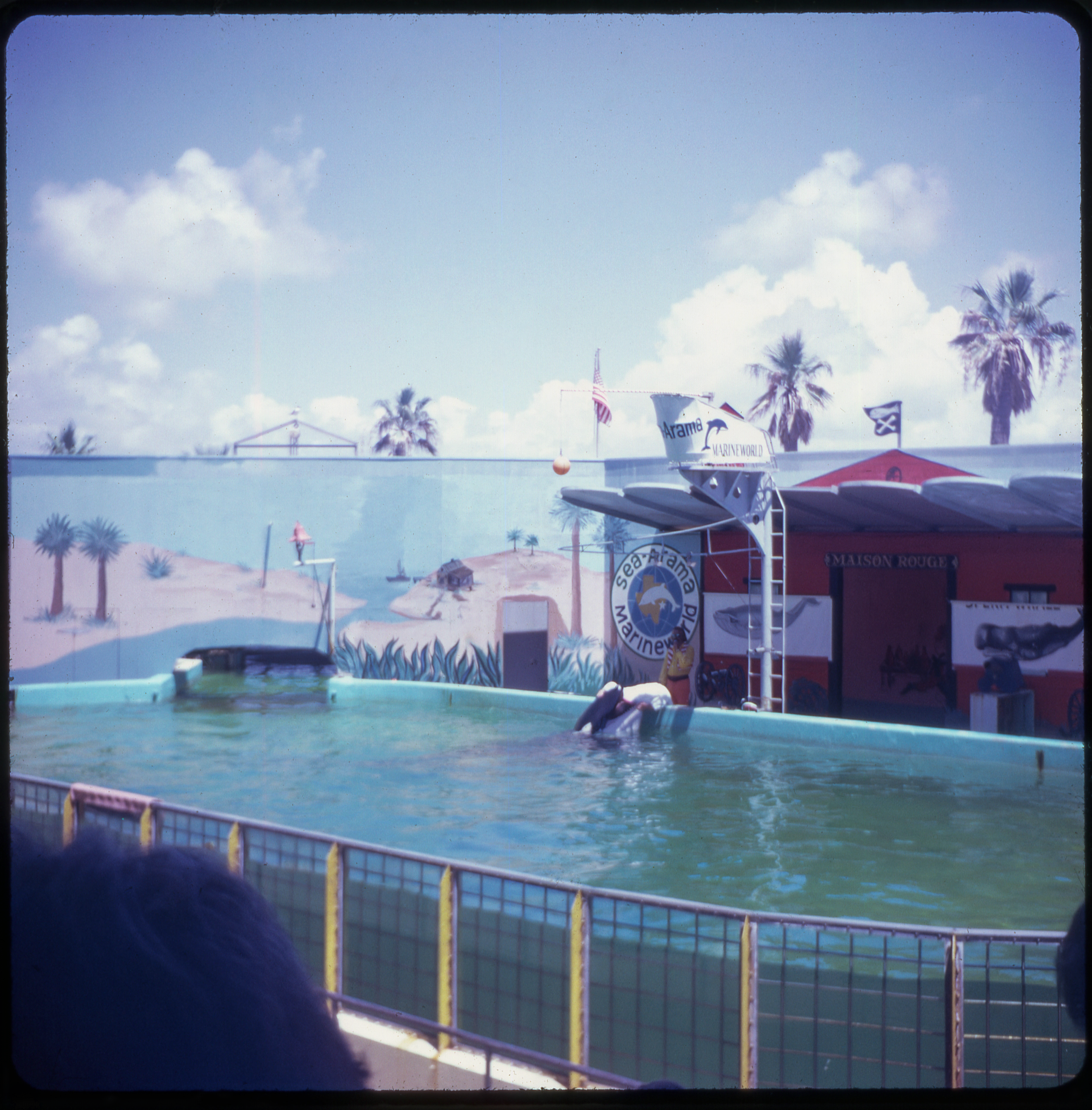
- Sea-Arama Marineworld TX, Orca Whale (Mamuk) Show, Circa 1973
- Interactive map of Sea-Arama Marineworld
- Location: 91st & Seawall/West Beach, Galveston Island, Texas, USA 29°15'08.06"N 94°51'28.64"W
- Coordinates: 29°15′08.06″N 94°51′28.64″W
- Opened: 1965; 61 years ago
- Closed: January 1990
- Theme: Wildlife
- Operating season: Year Round

Sea-Arama Marineworld was a marine mammal park located on the Gulf Coast in Galveston Island, Texas. Opening in 1965, the park was an animal-focused oceanarium, zoo, and aquarium that attracted hundreds of thousands of attendees each year. The park worked with wildlife experts to study Ridley sea turtles, support brown pelican nesting, and treat/rehabilitate marine life.

After the opening of SeaWorld San Antonio in 1988, Sea-Arama’s popularity began to wane and attendance declined. The park closed in January 1990. Animals and marine life from Sea-Arama were relocated to SeaWorld San Antonio and similar parks in the area. After several plans to revitalize the space failed to come to fruition, the park was torn down in 2006. In 2008, the former site of Sea-Arama was used to provide a temporary debris holding station after Hurricane Ike.

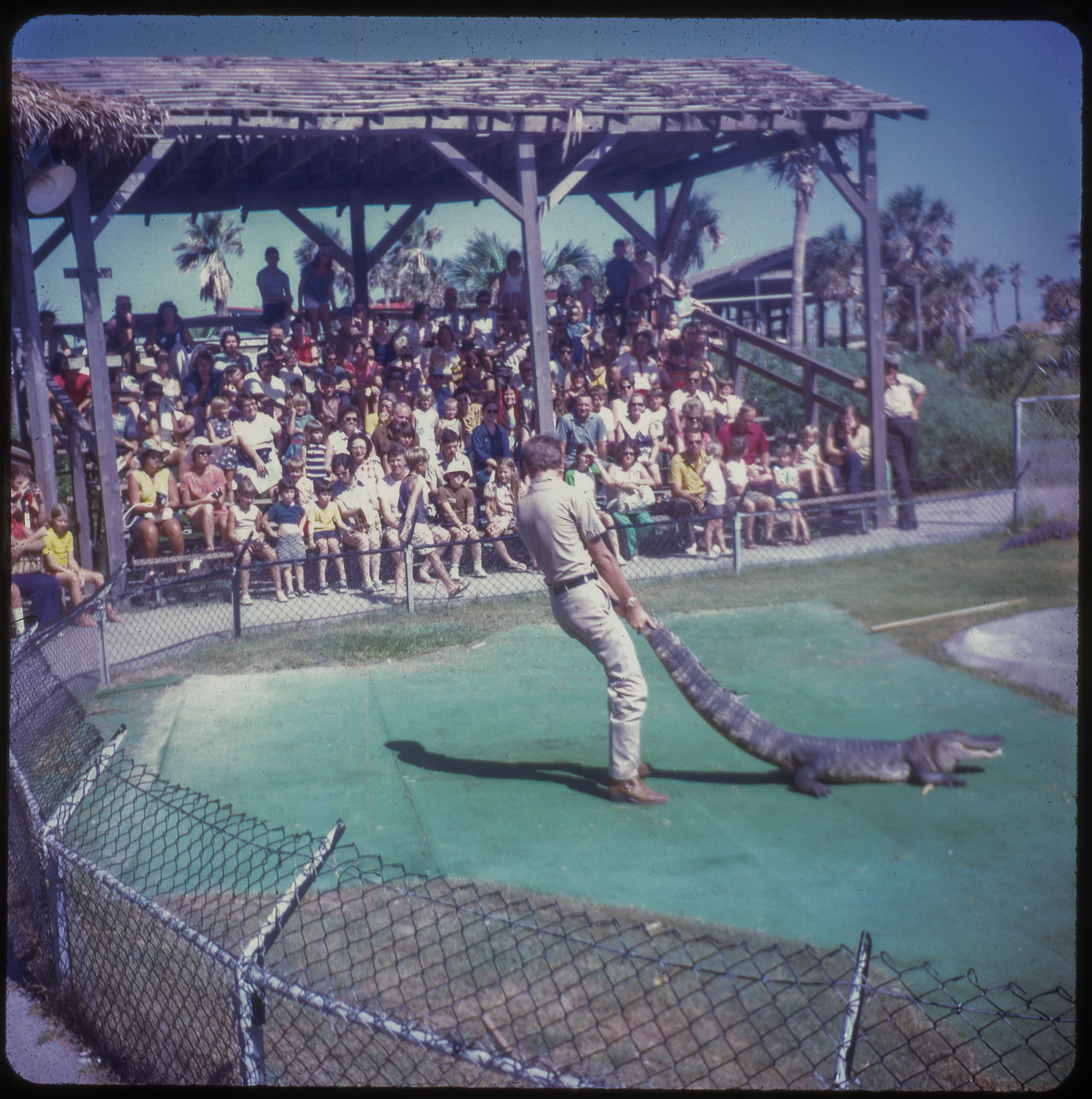
Sea-Arama Marineworld Texas, Alligator Wrestling Show, Circa 1973

== Attractions ==
- Orca Whale Shows featuring Mamuk (1968–†1974) and Lil'Nooka (†1970). The live events would have the whales leaping 13 feet into the air and other shows would have a staff member place their head in the mouth of the whale. Director of training Ken Beggs claimed Mamuk once attempted to bite him.
- Dolphin Show
- Sea Lion Show
- Marine Animal Training Workshop
- Dive to the Deep Adventure Seven Seas Aquarium Tour
- Water Ski Show
- Puppet Show
- Petting Zoo
- Shark Lagoon
- Exotic Bird Show
- Rattlesnake Show (featuring an event known as the "Kiss of Death' between a snake and handler).
- Animal Exhibitions including false killer whales, tortoises, kangaroos, pelican display, piranhas, spoonbill & wading Birds, river otters, seal & sea lion exhibit, Australian black swans, and alligators (with wrestling shows).
