= Captive =

Captive or Captives may refer to:

== Arts, entertainment, and media ==
=== Films ===
- Captive (1980 film), a sci-fi film, starring Cameron Mitchell and David Ladd
- Captive (1986 film), a British-French film starring Oliver Reed
- Captive (1991 film), a television film starring Joanna Kerns and Barry Bostwick
- Captive (1998 film), a film starring Erika Eleniak and Michael Ironside
- Captive (2003 film), an Argentine film starring Bárbara Lombardo
- Captive (2008 film), a Russian-Belgian film
- Captive (2012 film), a Filipino-French film directed by Brillante Mendoza, starring Isabelle Huppert
- Captive (2015 film), an American thriller film starring Kate Mara and David Oyelowo
- Captive (2021 film), a Canadian documentary film
- Captives, a 1994 British romantic crime drama film

=== Television ===
- Captive (2004 TV series), a 2004 New Zealand show
- Captive (2016 TV series), a 2016 Netflix documentary series
- Captive (Fear the Walking Dead), an episode of the television series Fear the Walking Dead

=== Other uses in arts, entertainment, and media ===
- Captive (soundtrack), an album by The Edge, guitarist of U2
- Captive (video game), a 1990 computer role-playing game
- Captive!, a novel in World of Adventure series by Gary Paulsen

== Business ==
- Captive insurance, insurance companies established with the specific objective of financing risks emanating from their parent group
- Captive service, a type of business process outsourcing where an organization will use a wholly owned subsidiary instead of a third-party vendor

== Computing and technology ==
- Captive NTFS, an open-source project
- Captive portal, a technique that forces an HTTP client on a network to see a special web page

== See also ==
- Captivity (disambiguation)
- The Captive (disambiguation)
