= Acuario Nacional de Cuba =

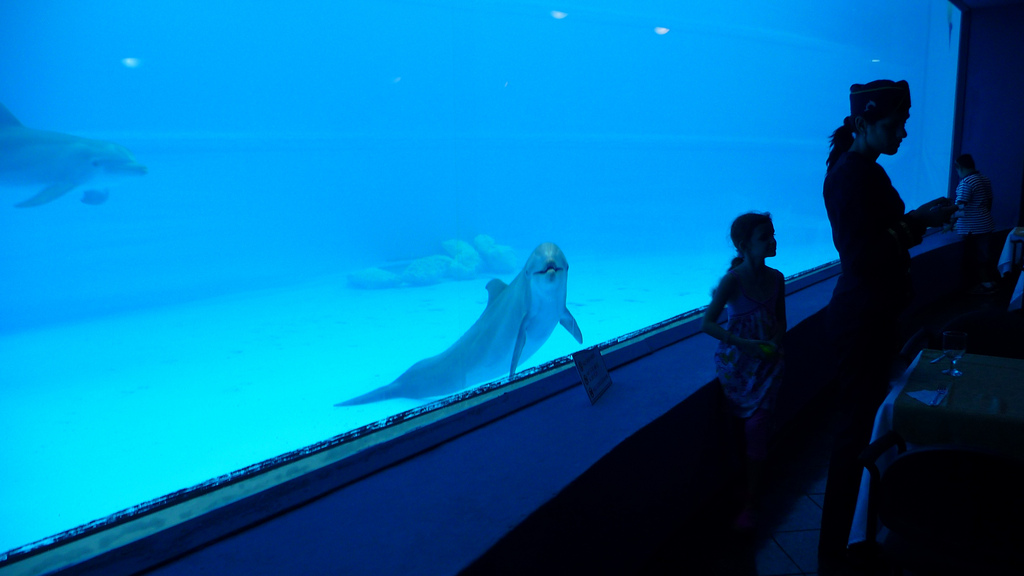
- Interactive map of Acuario Nacional de Cuba
- 23.1155949°N 82.4366426°W
- Date opened: January 23, 1960
- Location: Havana, Cuba
- No. of animals: 2700
- No. of species: 350
- Major exhibits: Tropical Island, Marine Grotto, Mangrove, Marine Landscapes, Fish and Invertebrates, Commercial Species, Seal and Sea Lion Exhibits, Dolphinarium
- Website: Official website

The Acuario Nacional de Cuba (National Aquarium of Cuba) is an aquarium in Havana, Cuba established in 1960 to focus on "research and environmental education". Displays include those of coral and other tropical species, as well as a dolphinarium and sea lion shows.

== History ==
In 1998, the original dolphin show stadium was damaged by a hurricane. A new stadium was built and opened in 2000.
