= The Captive =

The Captive may refer to:

== Films ==
- The Captive (1915 film), a drama film directed by Cecil B. DeMille
- The Captive, the English title of La Prisonnière, a 1968 film, the final work of French director Henri-Georges Clouzot
- The Captive (2000 film), a drama film directed by Chantal Akerman
- The Captive (2014 film), a film directed by Atom Egoyan
- The Captive (2025 film), a Spanish-Italian period film

== Literature ==
- The Captive (1769 play), a work by the Irish writer Isaac Bickerstaffe
- The Captive, the English title of La Prisonnière, part of In Search of Lost Time, a 1927 novel in seven volumes by Marcel Proust
  - The Captive (play), a 1926 English-language adaptation by Arthur Hornblow, Jr. of the play La prisonnière by Édouard Bourdet

== Other arts, entertainment, and media ==
- The Captive (album), an album by former Dispatch member Braddigan
- The Captive (painting), by Joseph Wright of Derby, c. 1778
- The Captive (Ralli), painting by Théodore Jacques Ralli, c. 1885

== See also ==
- Captive (disambiguation)
- Captivity (disambiguation)
