= Babylonian captivity (disambiguation) =

The Babylonian captivity was the period in Jewish history during which the Jews of the ancient Kingdom of Judah were captives in Babylon.

Babylonian captivity may also refer to:

- Babylonian Captivity of the Papacy, the Papacy's sojourn in Avignon between 1309 and 1378
- On the Babylonian Captivity of the Church, a tract written by Martin Luther in 1520 examining the seven sacraments of the medieval Church in the light of the Bible
- History of the Captivity in Babylon, a pseudepigraphical text of the Old Testament that supposedly provides omitted details concerning the prophet Jeremiah
- The Babylonian Captivity (painting), a ceiling painting by Eugene Delacroix
