= Captivity (animal) =

Animal being held by humans

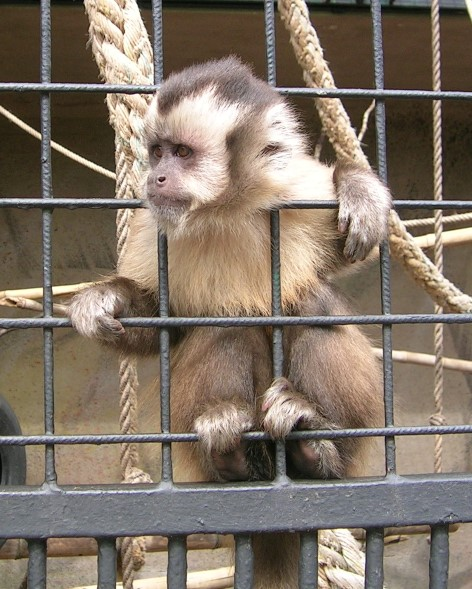
Monkey in a cage

Animal captivity is the confinement of domestic and wild animals. More specifically, animals that are held by humans and prevented from escaping are said to be in captivity. The term animal captivity is usually applied to wild animals that are held in confinement, but this term may also be used generally to describe the keeping of domesticated animals such as livestock or pets. This may include, for example, animals in farms, private homes, zoos, aquariums, public aquariums and laboratories. Animal captivity may be categorized according to the particular motives, objectives, and conditions of the confinement.

== History ==
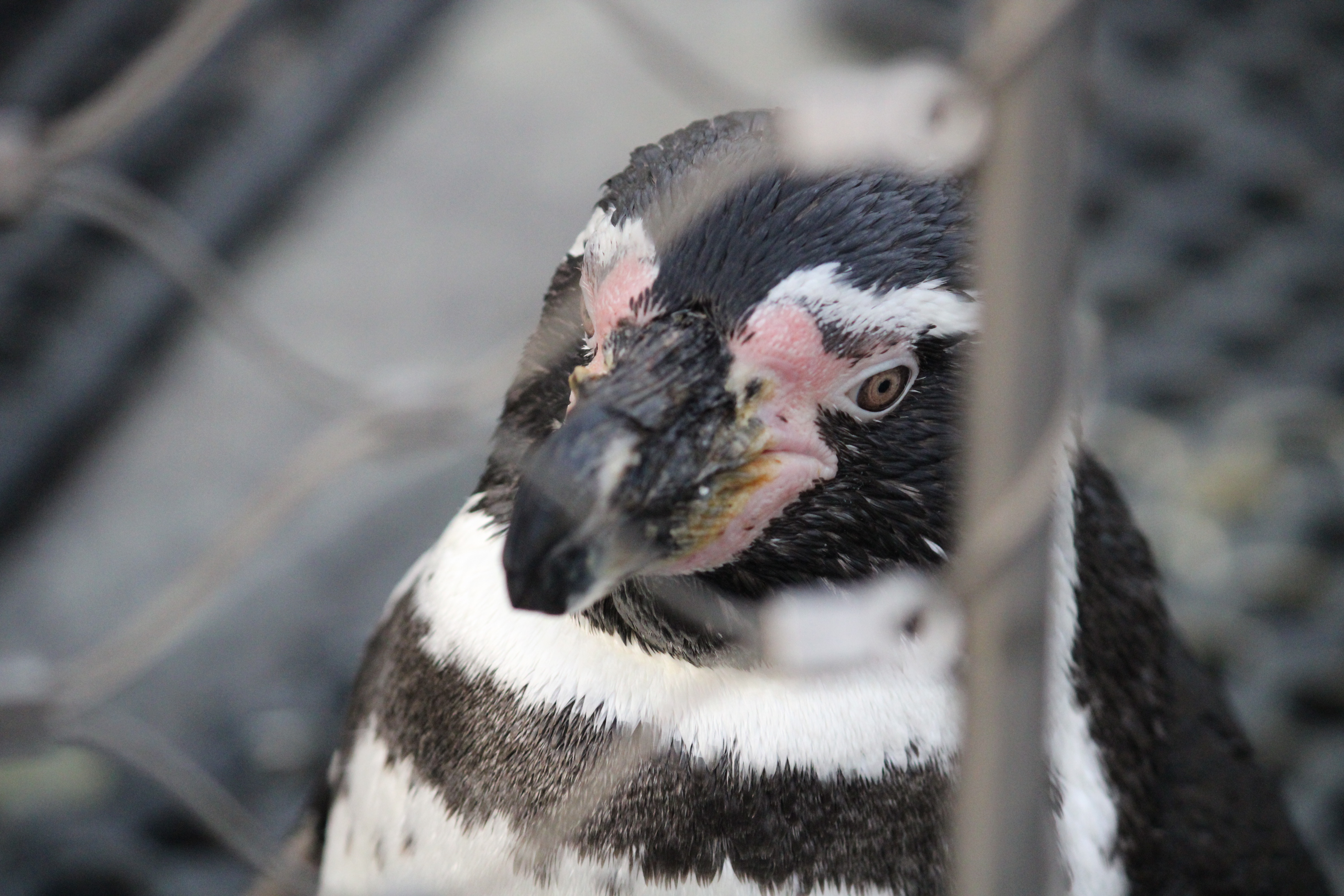
Humboldt penguin at Copenhagen Zoo, Denmark

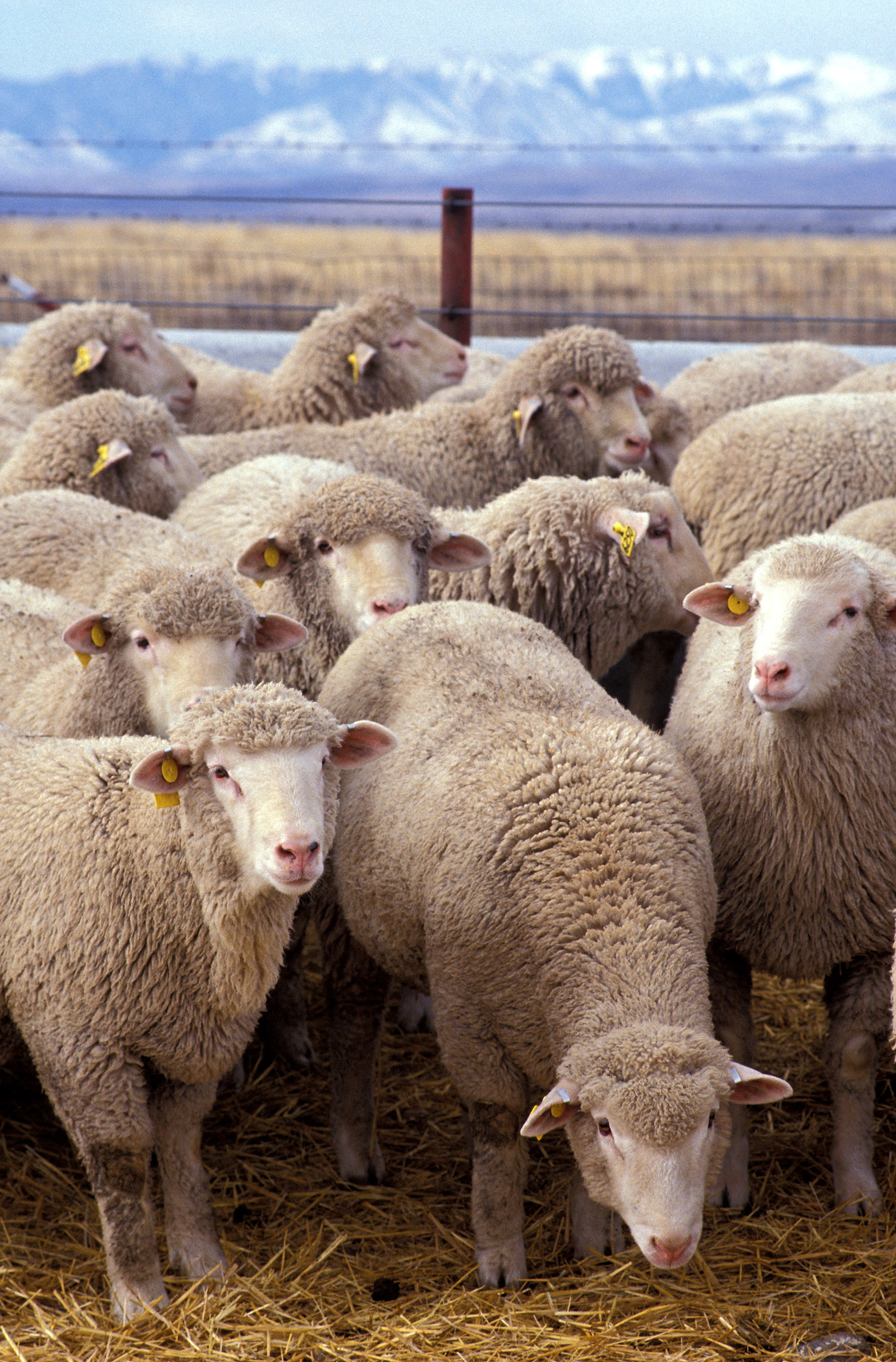
Animal husbandry

All throughout history, domestic animals like pets and livestock were kept in captivity and tended by humans. However, pets and livestock were not the only animals to be put in captivity and receive human care because wild animals had this as well. Despite the fact that wild animals have been harbored by humans for thousands of years, this captivity has not always come close to present zoos. Some were failed domestication attempts. Furthermore, the wealthy, predominantly the aristocrats and kings, collected wild animals for various reasons. The affluent built the first zoos as personal collections to demonstrate their dominance and wealth. These private collections of animals were known as menageries. Contrary to domestication, the ferociousness and natural behaviour of the wild animals were preserved and exhibited. Today, zoos claim to have other reasons for keeping animals under human care: conservation, education and science.

== Behavior of animals in captivity ==
Captive animals, especially those not domesticated, sometimes can develop abnormal behaviours.

One type of abnormal behaviour is stereotypical behaviors, i.e. repetitive and apparently purposeless motor behaviors. Examples of stereotypical behaviours include pacing, self-injury, route tracing and excessive self-grooming. These behaviors are associated with stress and lack of stimulation.

Many who keep animals in captivity attempt to prevent or decrease stereotypical behavior by introducing stimuli, a process known as environmental enrichment. The goals of environmental enrichment are to make environments more complex and fluid, offer more engaging and complex processes, and give animals more chances to make decisions. Techniques that are commonly used to provide environmental enrichment include social, occupation, physical, sensory, and nutritional.

Another type of abnormal behavior shown in captive animals is self-injurious behavior (SIB). Self-injurious behavior indicates any activity that involves biting, scratching, hitting, hair plucking, or eye poke that may result in injuring oneself. Although its reported incidence is low, self-injurious behavior is observed across a range of primate species, especially when they experience social isolation in infancy. Self-bite involves biting one's own body—typically the arms, legs, shoulders, or genitals. Threat bite involves biting one's own body—typically the hand, wrist, or forearm—while staring at the observer, conspecific, or mirror in a threatening manner. Self-hit involves striking oneself on any part of the body. Eye poking is a behavior (widely observed in primates) that presses the knuckle or finger into the orbital space above the eye socket. Hair plucking is a jerking motion applied to one's own hair with hands or teeth, thus resulting in its excessive removal.

The proximal causes of self-injurious behavior have been widely studied in captive primates; either social or nonsocial factors can trigger this type of behavior. Social factors include changes in group composition, stress, separation from the group, approaches by or aggression from members of other groups, conspecific male individuals nearby, separation from females, and removal from the group. Social isolation, particularly disruptions of early mother-rearing experiences, is an important risk factor. Studies have suggested that, although mother-reared rhesus macaques still exhibit some self-injurious behaviors, nursery-reared rhesus macaques are much more likely to self-abuse than mother-reared ones.

Nonsocial factors include the presence of a small cut, a wound or irritant, cold weather, human contact, and frequent zoo visitors. For example, a study has shown that zoo visitors density positively correlates with the number of gorillas banging on the barrier, and that low zoo visitors density caused gorillas to behave in a more relaxed way. Captive animals often cannot escape the attention and disruption caused by the general public, and the stress resulting from this lack of environmental control may lead to an increased rate of self-injurious behaviors.

There are studies that suggest the many abnormal captive behaviors, including self-injurious behavior, can be successfully treated by pair housing. Pair housing provides a previously single-housed animal with a same-sex social partner. This method is especially effective with primates, which are widely known to be social animals. Social companionship provided by pair housing encourages social interaction, thus reducing abnormal and anxiety-related behavior in captive animals as well as increasing their locomotion.

== Why animals are placed in captivity ==
Wild animals may be placed in captivity for conservation, studies, exotic pet trade, and farming. Places of captivity that are connected with the AZA, (Association of Zoos and Aquariums), may hold animals' captive as a means to save them from extinction. For example, the AZA SAFE, (Save Animals From Extinction), promotes well-being and care of animals, conservation, and additional disciplines in order to protect and aid the wildlife. The organization focuses on creating recovery plans, cooperation between AZA workers, and advancement of conservation. Furthermore, the AZA and the zoos and aquariums accredited with the AZA use the help of educators, veterinarians, and people doing research. With their assistance, zoos and aquariums are able to have the proper necessities needed in recovery programs to prevent animals from going extinct.

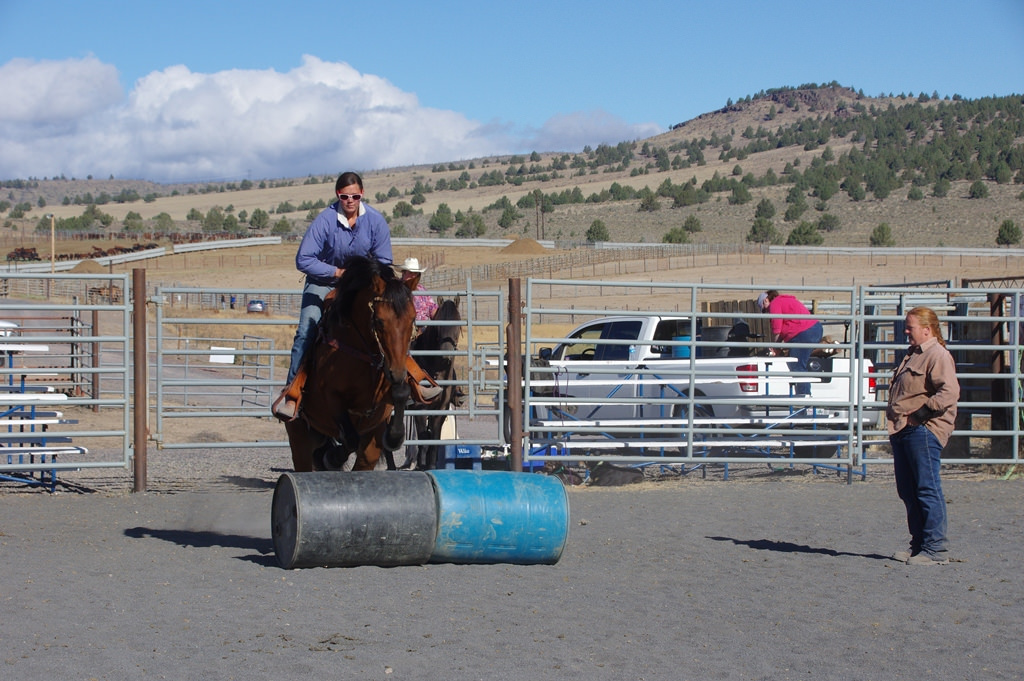
Kiger wild horse auction.

Annually, it is subjected that thousands of wild animals end up in captivity due to the wild animal trade. These animals can be held in captivity because of the overabundance of their population in roadside zoos. Additional reasons as to why animals may end up in captivity is because animals are captured from their original habitat, come from animal breeders, or come from the black market. When wild animals are captured and held in captivity, then they may be sold in pet stores, auction sales, or the World Wide Web.

== Zoos' impact on animal captivity ==
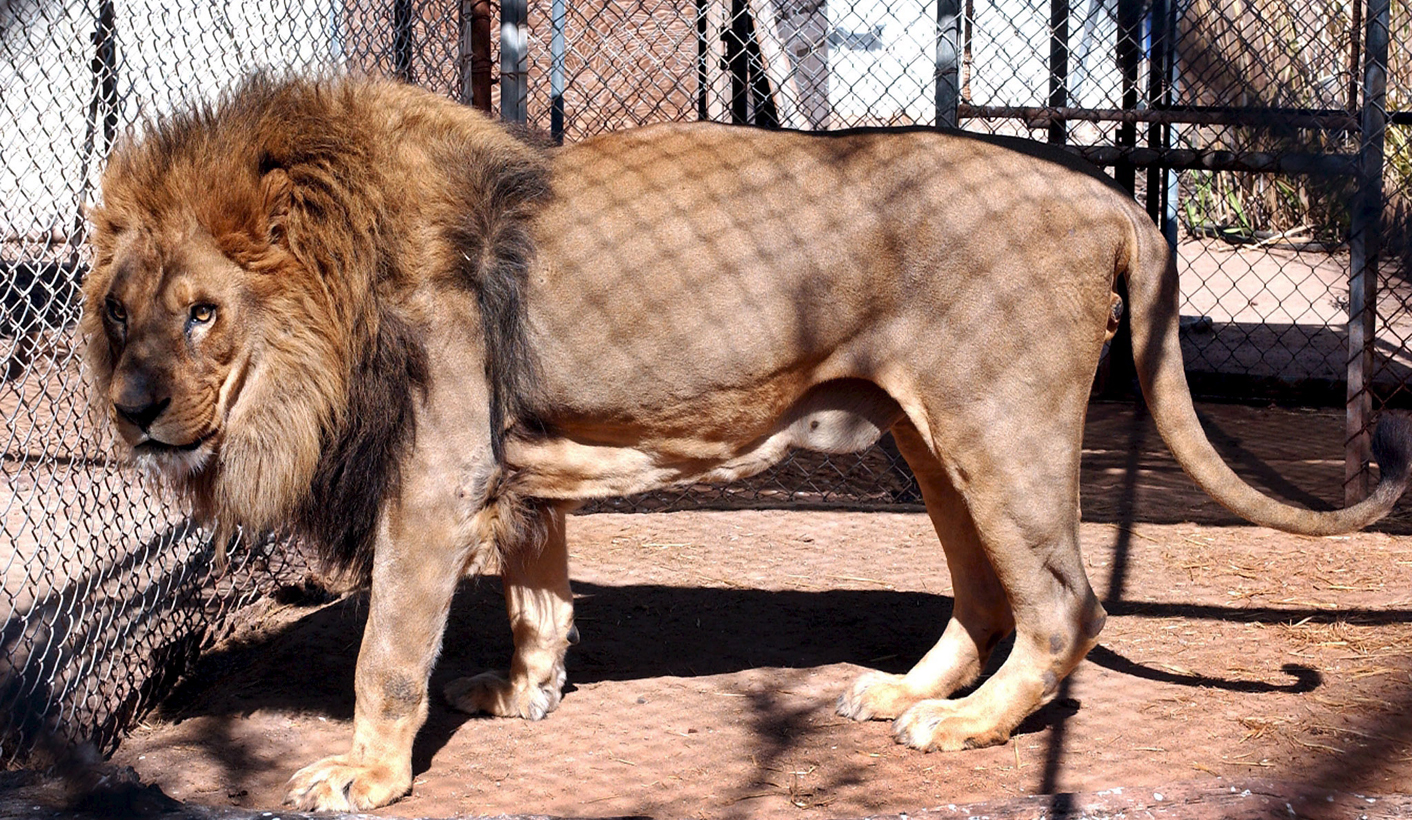
Photo of a lion at a captive breeding center.

Zoos are known as a place where visitors come in to see wild animals. This means zoos may keep animals in confinement. For example, zoos may keep animals captive as a means to save them from going extinct. More specifically, in 2020 the Science Advances published a study where they concluded that the work and population of human beings has affected the growth of animals going extinct around the world. The uproar of animals going extinct has caused zoos to use their captive breeding programs on endangered animals in an effort to create a stronger population. It is said that zoos are responsible for reducing the number of animals on the endangered species list and from extinction.

Zoos could also be known as a place where animals are put into after they are taken out of their natural habitat. When animals are pulled out from their native habitat and taken to a location they are unfamiliar with, then it is said that animals may experience shock and poor mental health. Furthermore, some wild animals have died inside zoos due to the shock of being placed in an unknown setting. To be more specific, this can also mean that taking animals away from their native habitat can possibly disrupt their way of living.

== List of wild animals in America commonly held in captivity ==
Name of animal and classification	Animal description	Lifespan in the wild	Lifespan in captivity	Photo of animal
Alligators: reptile	The American alligators are considered to be crocodilians. Alligators may grow longer than 12 feet and weigh around 1,000 pounds (454 kg). This creature may be found in the southeastern area of the United States. More specifically, places such as Florida, Southern Virginia Border, Rio Grande (Texas), and west of the Gulf Coast. Alligators live in areas such as lakes, rivers, swamps, and wetlands. Furthermore, alligators' bodies are covered with scutes (scales) or osteoderms (bone skin)	35–50 years	65–80 years	Photo of the American alligator.
Bears: mammalia (mammals)	Bears come in all different shapes and sizes due to where they live and how much food they have in their environment. For example, the panda can weigh around 300 pounds (136 kg) and the male polar bear can weigh from 550-1700 pounds (249 to 771 kg). The range of bear heights can go from the panda who can be 4 feet tall to the polar bear who can be up to 11 feet tall.	20–30 years	Around 40 years	Photo that includes the bear subspecies.
Cougars: mammalia (mammals)	Cougars are considered to be mountain lions or pumas. The cougars' appearance is said to look like a larger version of a cat. The adult male cougar may weigh 200 pounds (91 kg) and the adult female may weigh 120 pounds (54 kg). The range of length for an adult cougar is said to be from 42 to 54 inches, including the tail that is 3 feet long.	Around 12 years	Up to 20 years	Photo of a cougar.
Chimpanzees: mammalia (mammals)	Chimpanzees are said to be social animals and their habitat is in the forests of Central Africa. In terms of appearance, chimpanzees have long black or brown hair that covers their body. Additionally, chimpanzees can be 3 feet tall. The females may weigh from 70 to 100 pounds (32 to 45 kg) and the males may weigh from 90 to 120 pounds (41 to 54 kg).	About 33 years	31.7 years for males and 38.7 years for females	Photo of a chimpanzee.
Lions: mammalia (mammals)	Lions are considered to be muscular and have broad bodies. In terms of their appearance, male lions have a mane of hair that surrounds the neck area. Lions also tend to have a yellow to gold coat. Additionally, male lions tend to be 10 feet in length and weigh around 330 to 550 pounds (150 kg to 249 kg). On the other hand, female lions, also known as lionesses, tend to be 9 feet in length and weigh between 265 and 395 pounds (120 kg to 179). Moreover, lions can be found in continents such as Africa, Asia, and Europe. More specifically, lions live in places such as Benin, Botswana, Cameroon, India, Kenya, Mozambique, Namibia, South Africa, Tanzania, and Zambia.	12 to 16 years	Around 25 years	Photo of Lion (right) and Lioness (left) together.
Ocelots: mammalia (mammals)	Ocelots are medium-sized animals. They have golden brown to silver colored fur as well as brown and black spots. Also, ocelots have stripes that starts at the inner edges of their eyes. Without the tail, ocelots are 3 feet long and weigh about 30 pounds (14 kg). This animal can be found in Arizona, Southern Texas and Northern Argentina. Furthermore, ocelots are night time animals. This is because they rest during the day and hunt during the night.	About 12 years	Around 20 years	Photo of an ocelot in the zoo.
Servals: mammalia (mammals)	Servals, a slender wild cat, has stripes and spots on its body. Serval can be small to medium-sized in length. To be more specific, this animal is approximately between 1 and 2 meters long. In terms of weight, Servals weigh around 20 to 40 pounds (9 to 19 kg). This animal lives close to the savannas in the central and south area of Africa. More specifically, servals live where there are rivers and streams.	10 to 12 years	Up to 20 years and higher	Photo of a serval.
Tigers: mammalia (mammals)	Tigers have many subspecies and are known as one of the largest cats in the world. More specifically, Amur tigers are 10 feet long and weigh around 660 pounds (300 kg). In contrast, the Sumatran tigers, the smaller subspecies of tigers, are about 8 feet long and weigh around 310 pounds (141 kg). The female tigers for every subspecies are stated to be smaller in size and lighter in weight compared to the males. Furthermore, tigers may be found in South and Southeast Asia, Eastern Russia, and China.	10 to 25 years	Up to 20 years	Photo of amur tigers (largest subspecies in tigers) in the zoo. In the image, there appears to be the mother tiger with one of her cubs. Photo of sumatran tiger (smallest subspecies in tigers).
Wolves: mammalia (mammals)	There are different subspecies of wolves such as grey, timer, or canines. In terms of looks, the grey wolves stated to look similar to the German shepherd. In terms of sizes, where they live impacts how big or small they are. For example, wolves in the north are considered to be bigger in contrast to the wolves in the south. Additionally, for length, wolves tend to be 3 to 5 feet long. Their tails often are one to two feet long in length. The male wolves can weight anywhere around 70 to 145 pounds (32 to 66 kg) and the female wolves can weigh anywhere from 60 to 100 pounds (27 to 45 kg). The gray wolf can be found in serval American states such as Alaska, North Idaho, North Michigan, North Wisconsin, Northeast Oregon, West Montana, and in Yellowstone park which is located in Wyoming.	Typically no more than 10 years	Up to 20 years	Photo of the gray wolf.
Honey Badgers: mammalia (mammals)	Mellivora capensis, commonly known as honey badgers, are considered small mammals that weigh from 11 to 35 pounds. Mellivora Capensis have been observed to defend themselves against Leopards, Pythons, and Crocodiles. Honey Badgers can be found in dry areas, grasslands, and forests in Africa, Asia, and the Indian Subcontinent. Honey Badgers are considered solitary mammals and have black and white fur with large sharp claws as distinctive features.	7-8 years in the wild	Approximately 24 years (longest recorded 31 years)	Photo of a Honey Badger within an enclosure at a zoo.
Giraffes: mammalia (mammals)	Giraffes are the tallest land animals, native to Africa, known for their long necks, spotted coats, and graceful gait. They feed on leaves, primarily from acacia trees, using their long tongues and necks to reach high branches. Social and gentle, giraffes live in loose herds and are a keystone species in their ecosystems.	Up to 25 years	20-27 years	photo of a giraffe
Meerkats: mammalia (mammals)	Meerkats are small, social mammals native to southern Africa. They are known for their upright stance and cooperative behavior. Living in groups called mobs, they share tasks like foraging, babysitting, and watching for predators. These diurnal creatures primarily eat insects but also small animals and plants.	15 years	20.6 years	photo of a meerkat

== See also ==
Animal husbandry

- Agriculture
- Animal husbandry
- Animal testing
- Domestication
- Intensive animal farming
- Free-range
- Livestock
- Working animal

Animal rights

- Animal–industrial complex
- Animal rights
- Animal sacrifice
- Animal welfare
- Blood sport
- Cruelty to animals
- List of animal welfare and animal rights groups
- Personhood § Non-human animals
- Testing cosmetics on animals
- World Animal Protection

Wild animal keeping

- Animal sanctuary
- Aquarium
- Behavioral enrichment
- Beluga whale § Captivity
- Captive elephants
- Captive killer whales
- Circus § Animal acts
- Dolphinarium
- Game reserve
- Human-animal communication
- Marine mammal park
- Menagerie
- Oceanarium
- Public Aquarium
- Safari Park
- Species reintroduction
- Wildlife trade
- Zoological garden
- Insectarium
