= Sint-Michiels =

Sub-municipality of the city of Bruges, Belgium

- Sub-municipality of Bruges
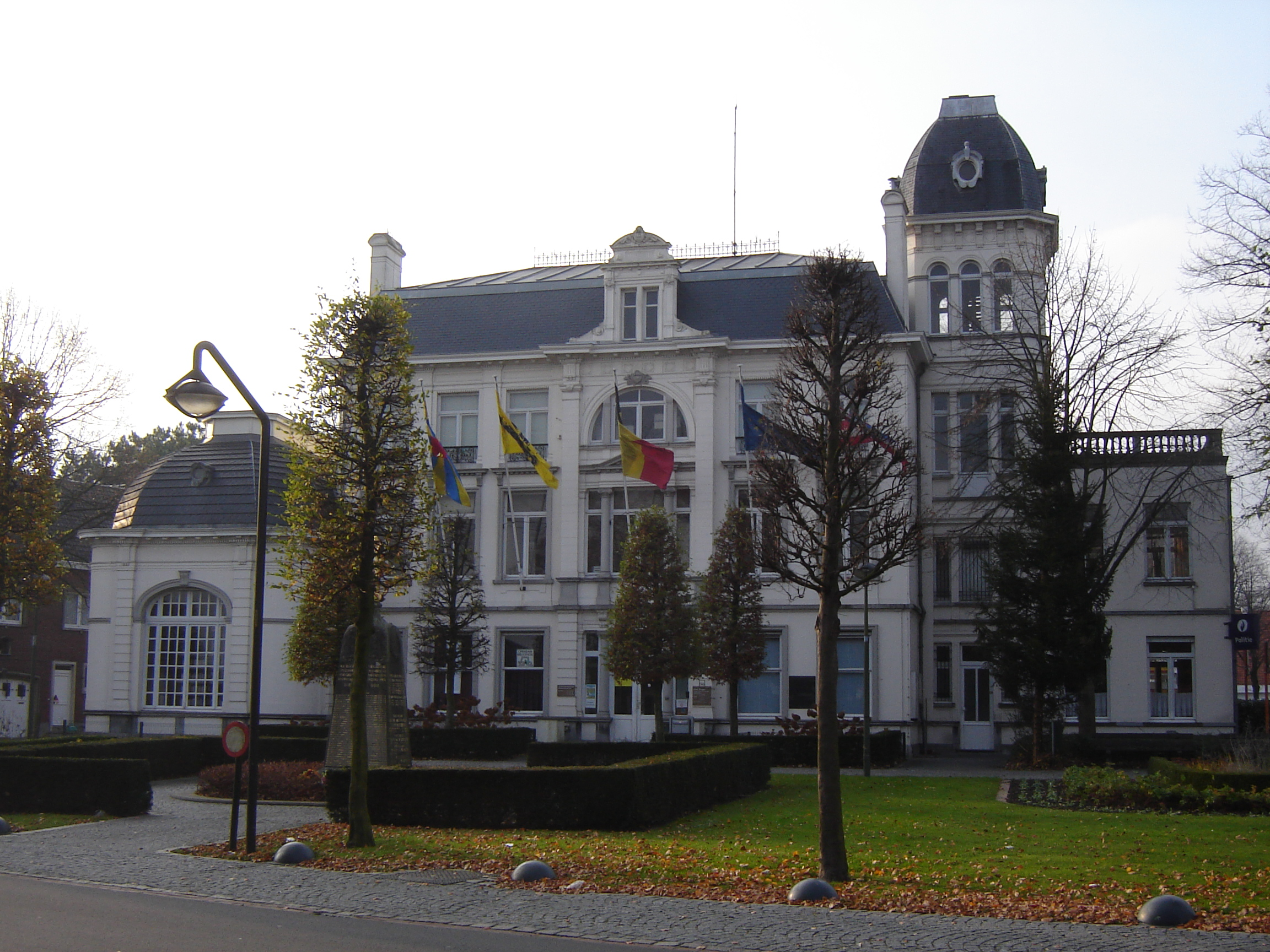
- Former castle "Bloemenoord" and former town hall of Sint-Michiels

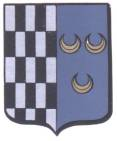
- Coat of arms
- Interactive map of Sint-Michiels
- Location within Belgium Location within West Flanders
- Coordinates: 51°11′19″N 3°12′42″E
- Country: Belgium
- Community: Flemish Community
- Region: Flemish Region
- Province: West Flanders
- Arrondissement: Bruges
- Municipality: Bruges

Area
  - Total: 14.02 km^{2} (5.41 sq mi)

Population (2014-12-31)
  - Total: 12,045
  - Density: 859.1/km^{2} (2,225/sq mi)
- Postal codes: 8200
- Area codes: 050

Sint-Michiels (Dutch pronunciation: [sɪnt mɪˈxils]) is a sub-municipality of the city of Bruges located in the province of West Flanders, Flemish Region, Belgium. It was a separate municipality until 1971. On 1 January 1971, it was merged into Bruges.

The amusement park Boudewijn Seapark with the dolphinarium is situated in Sint-Michiels.

== Bus & Car ==
In 1959 the American long distance bus (coach) operator Continental Trailways made an agreement with the Belgian firm of La Brugeoise et Nivelles to assemble 85 highway coaches, named NEW Silver Eagles, for the American market. The parts and tooling for this venture were supplied by Kässbohrer-SETRA of Germany. SETRA had a contract with Continental to produce the buses but wanted out so it could use all of its production capacity to serve its European customers. La Brugeoise et Nivelles, primarily a maker of railway equipment, agreed to assemble the buses with parts and tooling from SETRA, which arrived in 1960. BN also agreed to help Continental set up its own factory and train its original workers. The BN-built buses were based on the last SETRA Silver Eagles made in 1958. After the contract was fulfilled, BN kept the assembly line open in its factory and it was then operated under the name of Bus & Car, N.V. (Inc.). By the mid-1970s the US dollar had lost significant value on world markets, making production in Belgium uneconomic for customers in the USA. Continental sold its Belgian assets to MOL N.V. of Hooglede, Belgium and the factory closed around 1980. La Brugeoise et Nivelles changed its name to BN and was later bought out by Bombardier of Canada. BN's longtime specialty was railway equipment. BN also made several hundred PCC streetcars or trams for the cities of Brussels, Antwerp and Gent in Belgium plus the Dutch capital of The Hague. BN recently started production in 2018 of a large order of double deck passenger equipment for the Belgian Railways. The factory is expected to close when the order is completed in about three more years. The former Bus & Car factory building still exists and is presently a large shopping center.

== Gallery ==
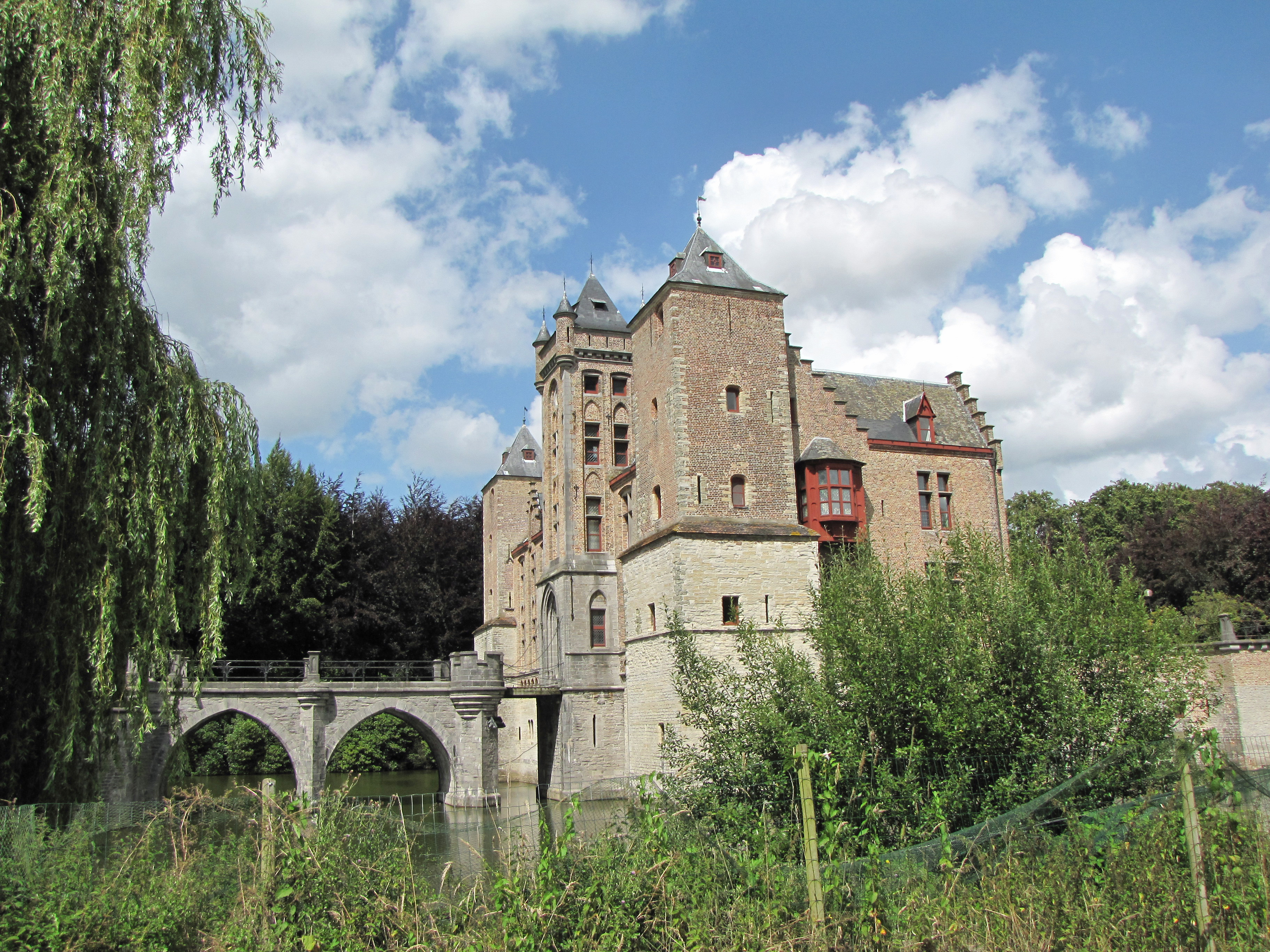
Tillegem Castle

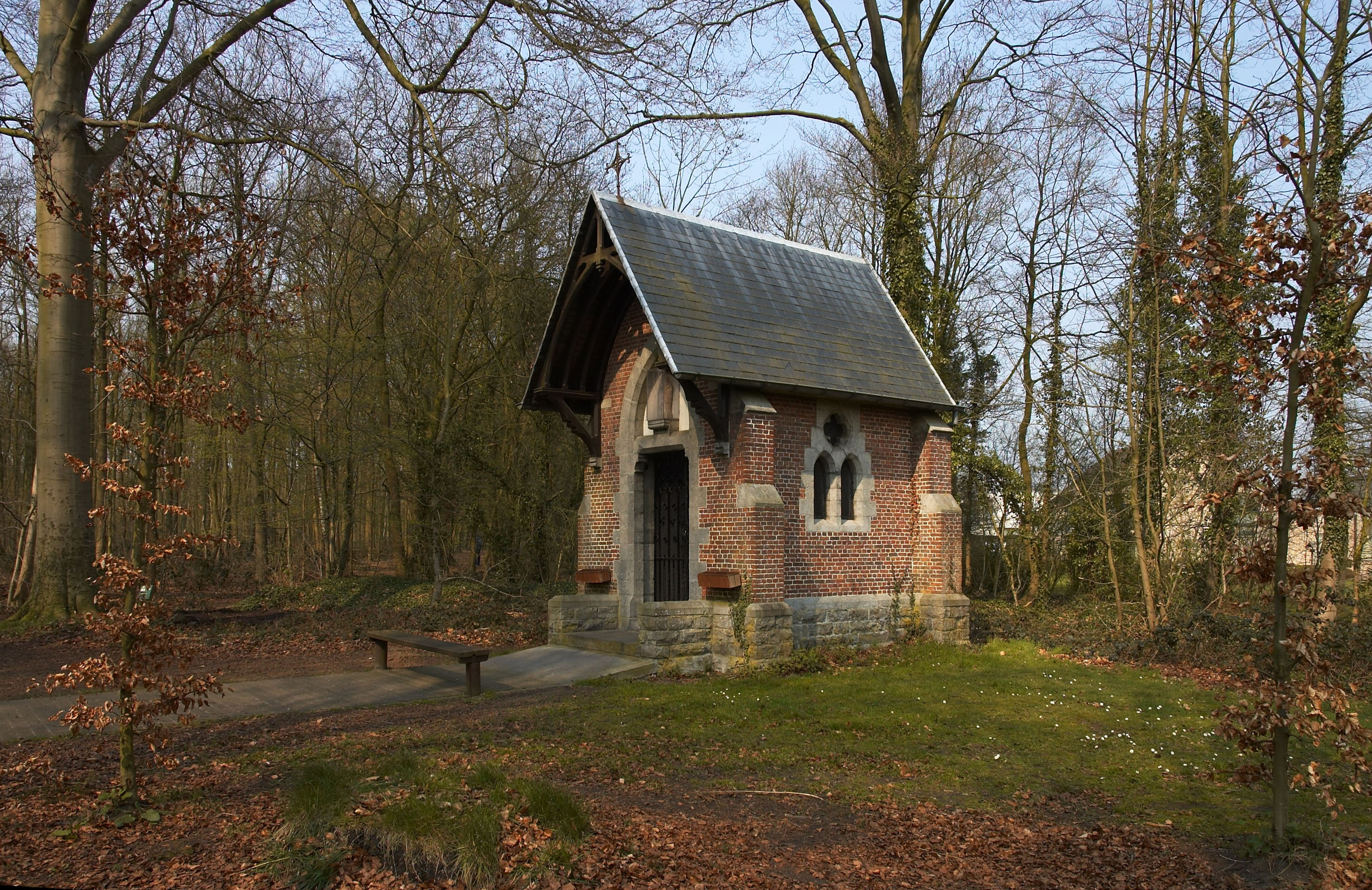
Small chapel in Tillegembos

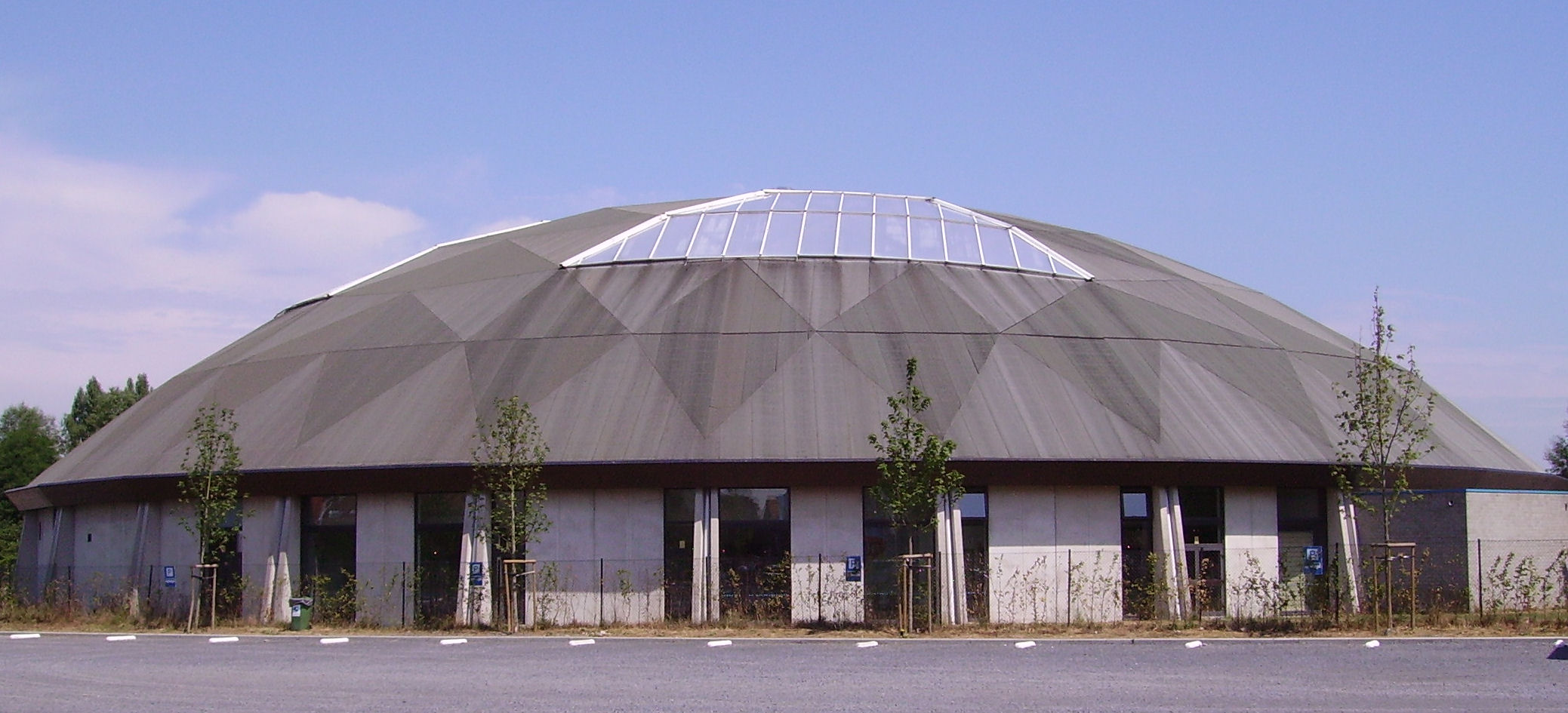
The exterior of the Boudewijn Seapark dolphinarium

== See also ==
- Eagle Bus
- Etienne Vermeersch (1934 – 2019), philosopher
- Sint-Michiels agreement
