= HMS Captivity =

Two ships of the Royal Navy have borne the name HMS Captivity. In both cases they were old ships that had been renamed after their conversion to prison ships:

- HMS Captivity was a former 64-gun third rate launched in 1772 as HMS Monmouth. She became a prison ship and was renamed HMS Captivity in 1796. She was broken up in 1816.
- HMS Captivity was a former 74-gun third rate launched in 1786 as HMS Bellerophon. She became a prison ship in 1815 and was renamed HMS Captivity in 1824. She was sold in 1836.
