= Theater of the Sea =

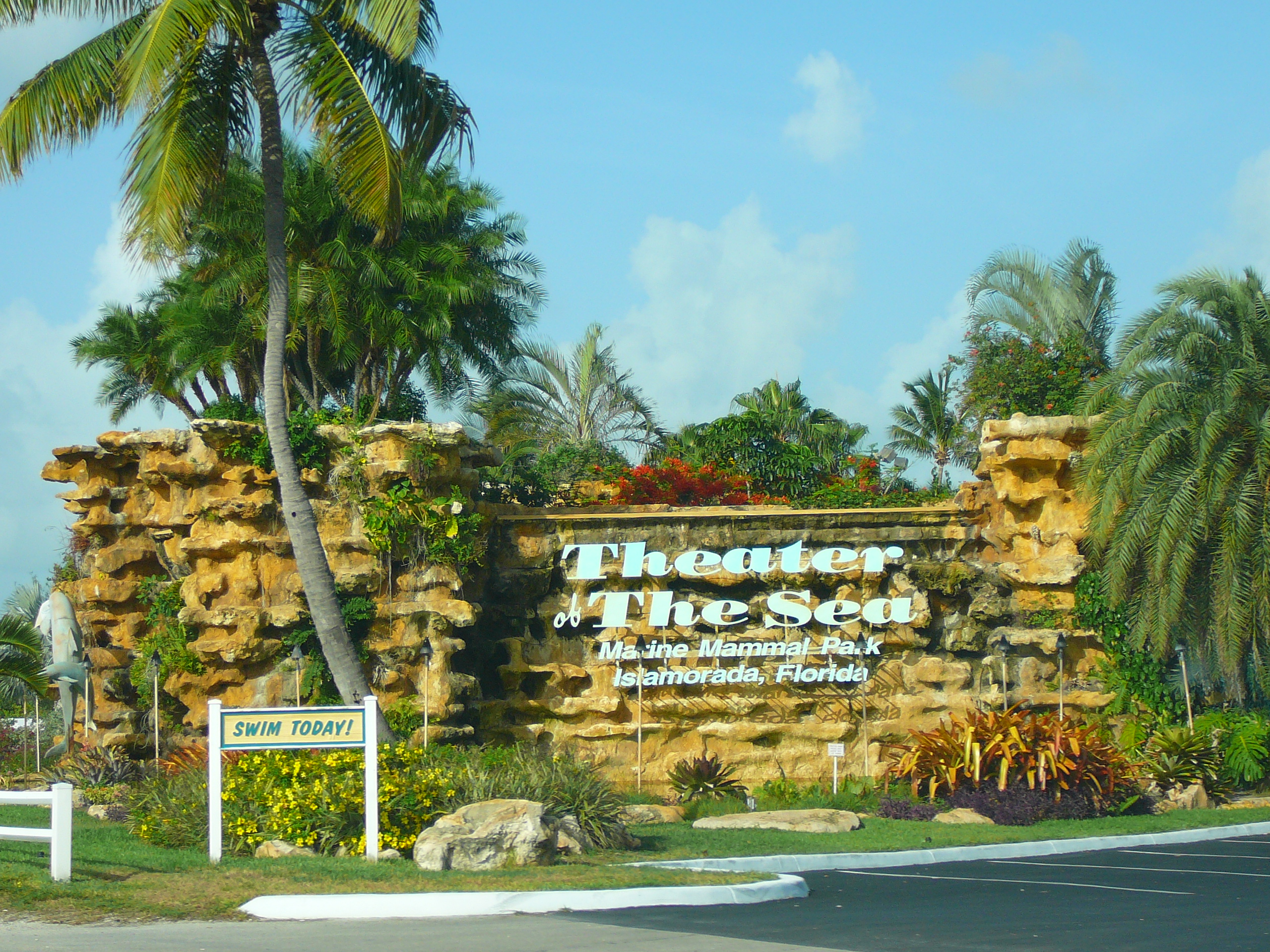
- Front entrance
- Interactive map of Theater of the Sea
- 24.944575°N 80.603685°W
- Date opened: 1946
- Location: Islamorada, Florida, United States
- Land area: 17 acres (6.9 ha)
- Website: theaterofthesea.com

Theater of the Sea, established in 1946, is a marine mammal park located in the Village of Islamorada, Florida, United States.
