= The Babylonian Captivity (painting) =

1838–1847 painting by Eugène Delacroix

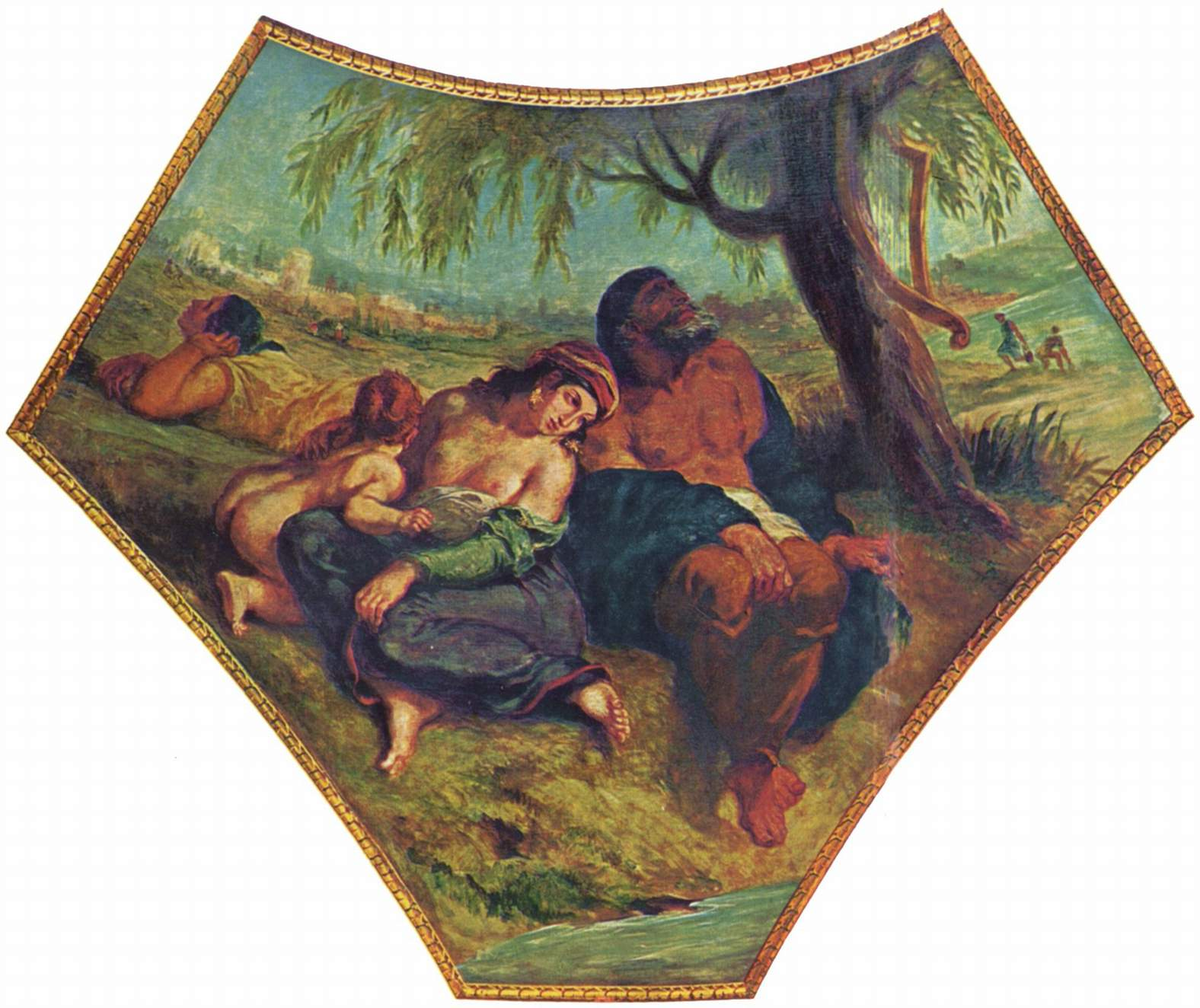
Eugène Delacroix: The Babylonian Captivity, 1838/1847; Palais Bourbon, Paris

The Babylonian Captivity is an 1838–1847 painting by Eugène Delacroix for the ceiling of the Assemblée nationale's library in the Palais Bourbon in Paris.

It interprets Psalm 137: 1-2 but is an allegorical Romantic interpretation rather than a religious one - Delacroix (an admirer of the Theist Voltaire) uses it as a motif of longing and nostalgia with figures lost in thought and sees its setting in Babylon on the Euphrates through an Orientalising lens.

== History ==
Between 1838 and 1847 Delacroix was commissioned to create oil paintings for the ceiling of the Chamber of Deputies in the Palais Bourbon, including the five domes of the 42-metre-long main hall and two half domes above the apses, each closing off the 10-metre-wide apses. He created an allegorical cycle on the theme of European civilization, inspired by the location and the room's function. Each of the five domes showed a scene based on the seven ancient liberal arts (Poetry, Theology, Law and Oratory, History and Philosophy, and Science), each surrounded by related pendentives. Captivity, Adam and Eve, The coin in the fish's mouth and The Beheading of John the Baptist are the four pendentives to Theology. Each has a medallion on it with the scene's title.

== Bibliography ==
- (in French) Yves Sjöberg: La décoration monumentale. Palais Bourbon. In: ders.: Pour comprendre Delacroix. Beauchesne 1963; S. 134–151 Online (unvollständig)
