= Captive (game show) =

- Genre: Reality/quiz show
- Created by: Rose Bay
- Presented by: John Aiken
- Country of origin: New Zealand
- Original language: English

Production
- Executive producers: Darryl McEwen; Jonathan Glazier; Julie Christie

Original release
- Network: TV2
- Release: 2003 – 2004

Captive is a New Zealand reality TV show that was broadcast on TV2 at 7 pm on week nights, the timeslot usually occupied by Shortland Street, in early 2004.

== Format ==
The show put five strangers together in an apartment and forced them to perform challenges, with one house-mate replaced every week.

The contestants were captive in a complex for the duration of their time on the show. They competed for prize money of nearly forty thousand New Zealand dollars by answering pop culture questions. If they correctly answered the question, they stole money from other captives. If they answer wrongly, they lost money. Whoever had the most money after a round was given the option to leave captivity or to take their winnings. However, the person who had the lowest sum of money after the final round had to leave empty-handed.

== Contestants ==
Liz Shaw appeared on Captive for one episode. She would later go on to feature on New Zealand Idol as the "anti Idol" in 2005.
