= Marine mammal park =

Type of amusement park

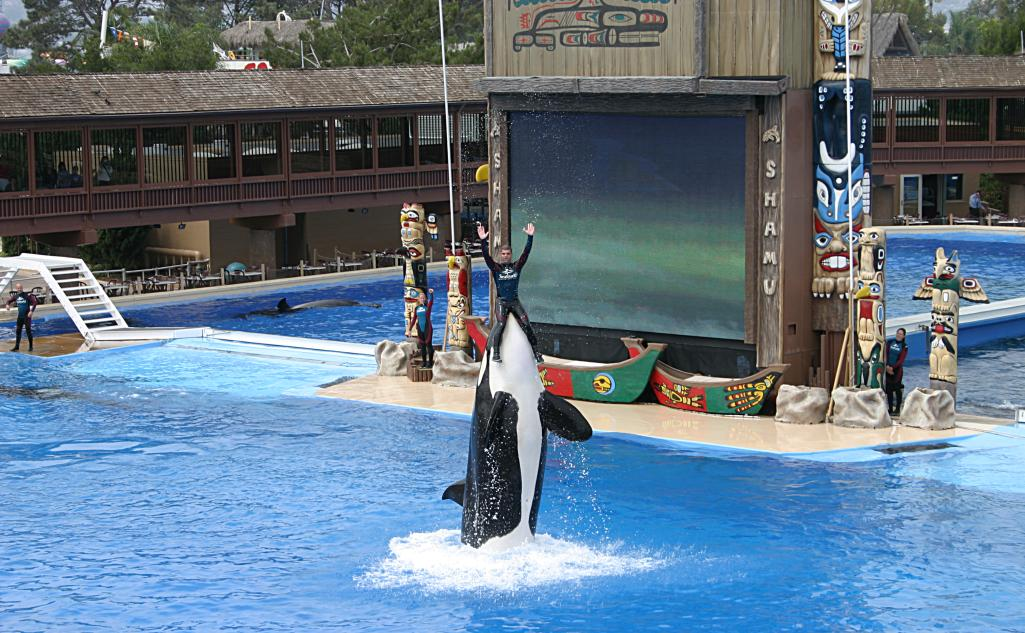
An orca (Kasatka) performs as Shamu at SeaWorld San Diego

A marine mammal park (also known as marine animal park and sometimes oceanarium) is a commercial theme park or aquarium where marine mammals such as dolphins, beluga whales and sea lions are kept within water tanks and displayed to the public in special shows. A marine mammal park is more elaborate than a dolphinarium, because it also features other marine mammals and offers additional entertainment attractions. It is thus seen as a combination of a public aquarium and an amusement park. Marine mammal parks are different from marine parks, which include natural reserves and marine wildlife sanctuaries such as coral reefs, particularly in Australia.

== History ==
Sea Lion Park opened in 1895 at Coney Island in Brooklyn, New York with an aquatic show featuring 40 sea lions. It closed in 1903.

The second marine mammal park, then called an oceanarium, was established in St. Augustine, Florida in 1938. It was initially a large water tank used to exhibit marine mammals for filming underwater movies, and only later became a public attraction. Today Marineland of Florida claims to be "the world's first oceanarium."

In November 1961, Marineland of the Pacific on the Palos Verdes Peninsula near Los Angeles became the first park to display an orca in captivity, although the orca named Wanda died after two days. The Vancouver Aquarium had the second orca held alive in captivity, Moby Doll, for three months in 1964.

Between the 1970s and the 1990s, technical advances and the public's increasing interest in aquatic environments prompted a shift to large marine mammal parks with cetaceans (mostly orcas and other species of dolphin) as attractions. Within this time, SeaWorld USA emerged, with operations in Orlando, Florida, San Diego, California, San Antonio, Texas and Aurora, Ohio (the Ohio location has since ceased operations).

On July 13, 1865, P. T. Barnum's museum in New York City caught fire and killed two captive beluga whales, which were boiled alive in their tank.

== List of parks ==
=== Asia ===
Name	Location
Ocean Park Hong Kong	Wong Chuk Hang (Hong Kong)

=== Australia ===
Name	Location
Coffs Coast Wildlife Sanctuary	Coffs Harbour (Australia)
Sea World	Gold Coast, Queensland (Australia)
Sea Life Sunshine Coast	Mooloolaba, Queensland (Australia)

=== Europe ===
Name	Location
Dolfinarium Harderwijk	Harderwijk (Netherlands)
Marineland (Catalunya)	Palafolls (Spain)
Marineland (Mallorca)	Costa d'en Blanes (Spain)
Mediterraneo Marine Park	Malta
Loro Parque	Puerto de la Cruz, Tenerife (Spain)
Onmega Dolphintherapy Center	Marmaris, Mediterranean (Turkey)

=== North America ===
Name	Location
Miami Seaquarium	Miami, FL (USA)
Discovery Cove	Orlando, FL (USA)
Delphinus Dreams Cancún	Cancún, Q.Roo (Mexico)
Delphinus Riviera Maya	Riviera Maya, Q.Roo (Mexico)
Delphinus Xcaret	Riviera Maya, Q.Roo (Mexico)
Delphinus Xel-Ha	Riviera Maya, Q.Roo (Mexico)
Delphinus Costa Maya	Costa Maya, Q.Roo (Mexico)
Dolphin Discovery	Isla Mujeres, Q. Roo (Mexico)
Dolphin Discovery	Cozumel, Q. Roo (Mexico)
Dolphin Discovery	Riviera Maya, Q. Roo (Mexico)
Dolphin Research Center	Marathon, FL (USA)
SeaWorld	San Diego, California (United States)
SeaWorld	Orlando, Florida (United States)
SeaWorld	San Antonio, Texas (United States)
Sea Life Park Hawaii	Oahu, Hawaii (USA)
Sea Life Park Vallarta	Nuevo Vallarta, Nayarit (Mexico)
Marineland of Florida	St. Augustine, Florida (United States)
Marineland of Canada	Niagara Falls, Ontario (Canada)
Six Flags Discovery Kingdom	Vallejo, California (USA)
Theater of the Sea	Islamorada, Florida Keys, Florida (United States)

=== South America ===
Name	Location
Mundo Marino	San Clemente del Tuyu (Argentina)

== Criticism and animal welfare ==
World laws on dolphinariums / marine mammal captivity: Nationwide ban on dolphinariums/marine mammal captivity / De facto nationwide ban on dolphinariums/marine mammal captivity due to strict regulations; Some subnational bans on dolphinariums/marine mammal captivity / Dolphinariums/marine mammal captivity are currently being phased out ahead of a nationwide ban; Dolphinariums/marine mammal captivity legal / No data

Many animal welfare groups, such as the WSPA, consider keeping whales and dolphins in captivity a form of abuse. The main argument is that whales and dolphins do not have enough freedom of movement within their artificial environments. The existence of marine mammal parks is thus very controversial.

Although sizable pools for whales and dolphins require an extraordinarily technical and financial expenditure and are thus very difficult to maintain, many marine mammal parks endeavour to improve the conditions of captivity and attempt to engage in public education as well as scientific studies. For that purpose, many marine mammal parks joined the Alliance of Marine Mammal Parks and Aquariums, an international association dedicated to a high standard of care of marine mammals. It was founded in 1987 and established offices near Washington, D.C. in 1992. One report found that there is little objective evidence to indicate that marine mammal parks further public knowledge.

In 2010, the practice of keeping animals in captivity as trained show performers was heavily criticized when a trainer was killed by an orca whale at SeaWorld Orlando in Florida. Orca attacks were documented in the 2013 film Blackfish. In 2015, the California Coastal Commission banned the breeding of captive killer whales.

== Captivity of marine mammals ==
Animal captivity is the capturing and holding of an animal. Animals have been held captive for entertainment purposes and domestication. As of 2016, 63 whales and dolphins who are held captive have significantly less space than they would have in the wild. Marine mammals in captivity have demonstrated behavioral changes in response to the death or separation of a pod mate or family member.

=== Dolphins ===
Captive dolphins are six times more likely to die than those in the wild because of the stress and poor treatment that they endure, living on average 40 years less in captivity than they would in the wild. The stress of captivity prevents dolphin reproduction, with rare exceptions. Dolphins in their natural habitat spend approximately 80% of their time deep underwater and swim about 40 miles per day. Dolphins in captivity spend about 80% of their time above water and swim just a few miles per day.

=== Orcas ===
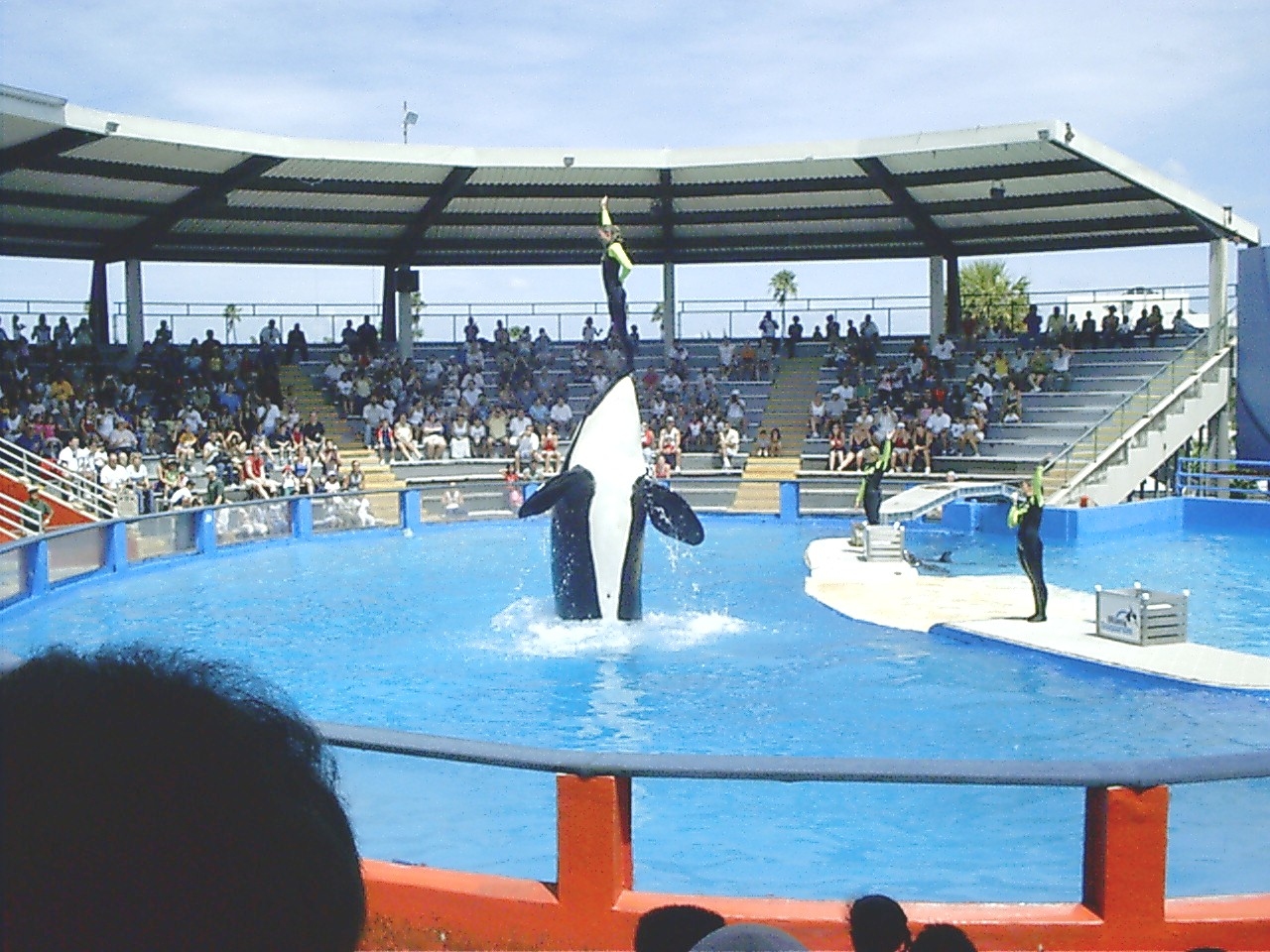
Lolita the Orca performed at Miami Seaquarium for more than 50 years.

In the wild, orcas swim about 100 miles per day and only spend approximately 10% of their lives at the surface of the ocean. In captivity, orcas cannot swim to their necessary depth, causing sunburn and blisters. The extended exposure to open air can cause the dorsal fin to collapse. As of 2016, 63 orcas are in captivity in the U.S. Studies show that nearly all captive orcas die for reasons other than old age. Twelve orcas have died at Sea World since 1970. SeaWorld San Diego has recorded 17 orca deaths since 1971. The orcas often die from pregnancy, disease and stress.

The orca brain is among the largest and most complex of all marine mammals. Orcas appear to understand that they are in captivity under human care, and they depend on their pod mates and family for survival; it is rare for them to survive on their own. An orca named Loita at the Miami Seaquarium, captured at four years old and in captivity for almost 50 years, was set to be released but died in the summer of 2023 before she could be freed.

=== Prevention of captivity ===
The U.S. Congress passed the Animal Welfare Act of 1966 to protect animals who are under human care. The Marine Mammal Protection Act, signed into law in 1972 by President Richard Nixon, prohibits the capture of marine mammals.

== See also ==
- Animal theme park
- List of dolphinariums
- WSPA
- Marine Mammal Protection Act
- Marine mammal training
- Captivity (animal)
- Captivity
