= Boudewijn Seapark =

Marine mammal park in Bruges, Belgium

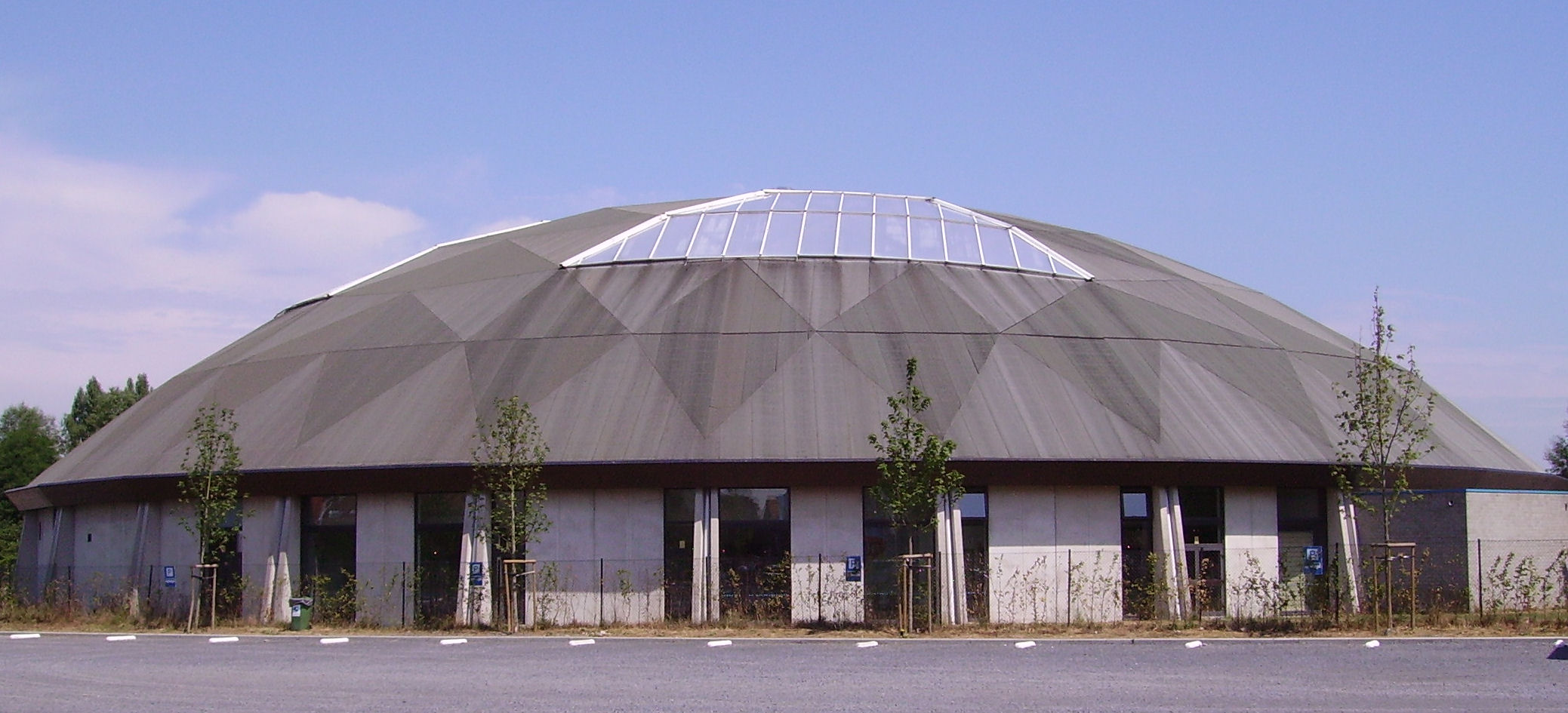
- Exterior of the dolphinarium
- Interactive map of Boudewijn Seapark
- 51°11′0″N 3°12′44″E
- Location: Sint-Michiels, Bruges, Belgium
- Owner: Aspro Parks
- Website: www.boudewijnseapark.be

Boudewijn Seapark is a marine mammal park and theme park located in Sint-Michiels, Bruges, Belgium.

== Dolphins ==
As of 2020 the park has eight bottlenose dolphins: Puck (F-53 years old), Linda (F-43 years old), Roxanne (F-34 years old), Yotta (F-21 years old), Indy (F-16 years old), Kite (M-14 years old), Moana (F-4 years old), and Ori (M-4 years old).
