= Dolphinarium =

Aquarium for dolphins

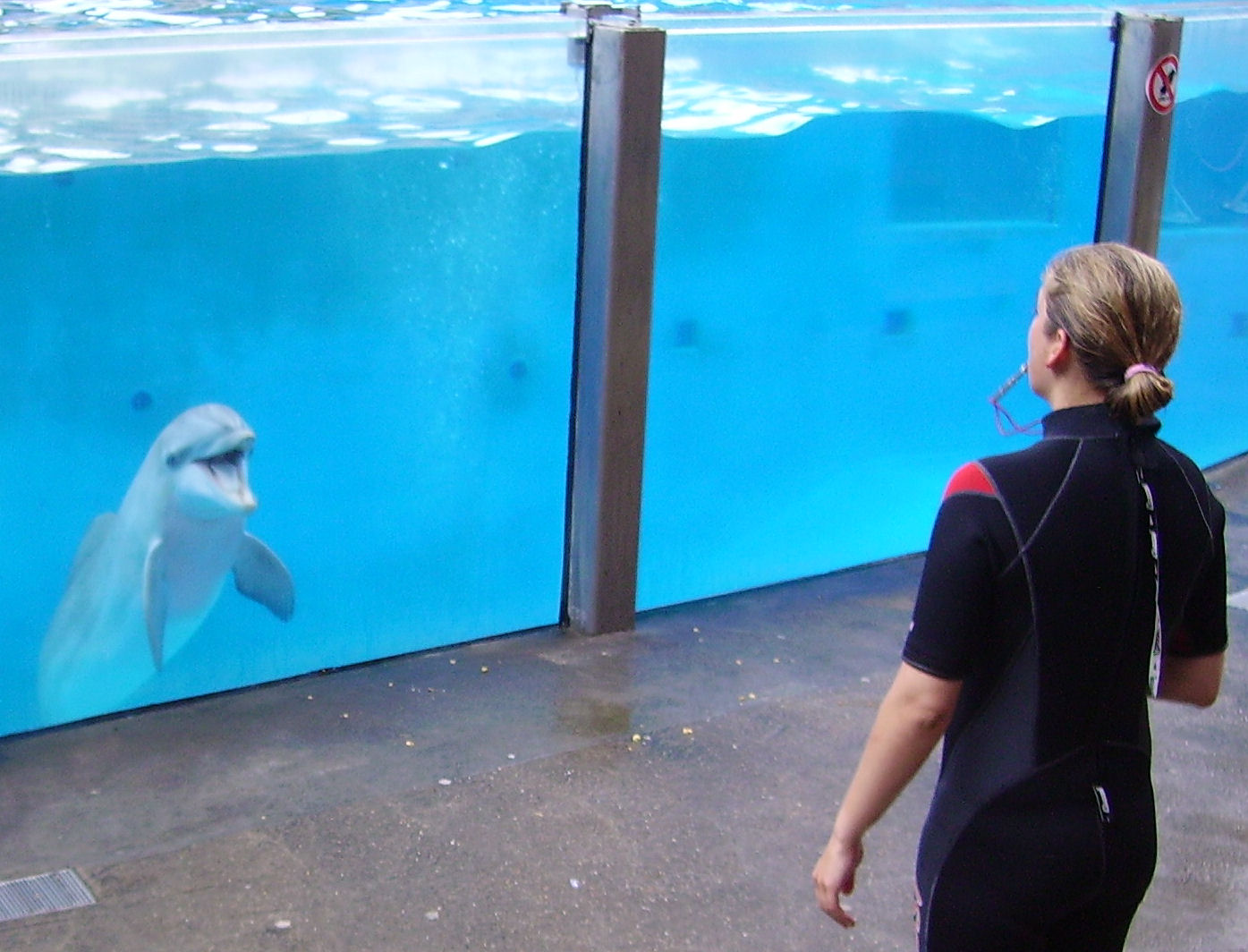
Boudewijn Seapark dolphinarium in Bruges, Belgium

A dolphinarium is an aquarium for dolphins. The dolphins are usually kept in a pool, though occasionally they may be kept in pens in the open sea, either for research or public performances. Some dolphinariums (sometimes called dolphinaria in plural) consist of one pool where dolphins perform for the public, others are part of larger parks, such as marine mammal parks, zoos or theme parks, with other animals and attractions as well.

While cetaceans have been held in captivity since the 1860s, the first commercial dolphinarium was opened only in 1938. Their popularity increased rapidly until the 1960s. Since the 1970s, increasing concern for animal welfare led to stricter regulation, which in several countries ultimately resulted in the closure of some dolphinariums. Despite this trend, dolphinariums are still widespread in Europe, Japan and North America. The most common species of dolphin kept in dolphinariums is the bottlenose dolphin, as it is relatively easy to train and has a long lifespan in captivity. While trade in dolphins is internationally regulated, other aspects of keeping dolphins in captivity, such as the minimum size and characteristics of pools, vary among countries. Though animal welfare is perceived to have improved significantly over the last few decades, many animal rights groups still consider keeping dolphins captive to be a form of animal abuse.

== History ==
Dolphinarium in Harderwijk, the Netherlands, Dutch newsreel from 1966

Though cetaceans have been held in captivity in both North America and Europe by 1860—Boston Aquarial Gardens in 1859 and pairs of beluga whales in Barnum's American Museum in New York City museum— dolphins were first kept for paid entertainment in the Marine Studios dolphinarium founded in 1938 in St. Augustine, Florida. It was here that it was discovered that dolphins could be trained to perform tricks. Recognizing the success of Marine Studios, more dolphinariums began keeping dolphins for entertainment. In the 1960s, keeping dolphins in zoos and aquariums for entertainment purposes increased in popularity after the 1963 Flipper movie and subsequent Flipper television series. In 1966, the first dolphin was exported to Europe. In these early days, dolphinariums could grow quickly due to a lack of legislation and lack of organised animal welfare.

New legislation, most notably the 1972 Marine Mammal Protection Act in the United States, combined with a more critical view on animal welfare, forced many dolphinariums around the world to close. A prominent example is the United Kingdom; in the early 1970s there were at least 36 dolphinariums and traveling dolphin shows, however, the last dolphinarium closed its doors in 1993. The last dolphinarium in Hungary was closed in 1992. In 2005 both Chile and Costa Rica prohibited keeping cetaceans captive. However, around 60 dolphinariums currently exist across Europe, of which 34 are within the EU. Japan, Mexico and the United States are also home to a relatively large number of dolphinariums.

== Design ==
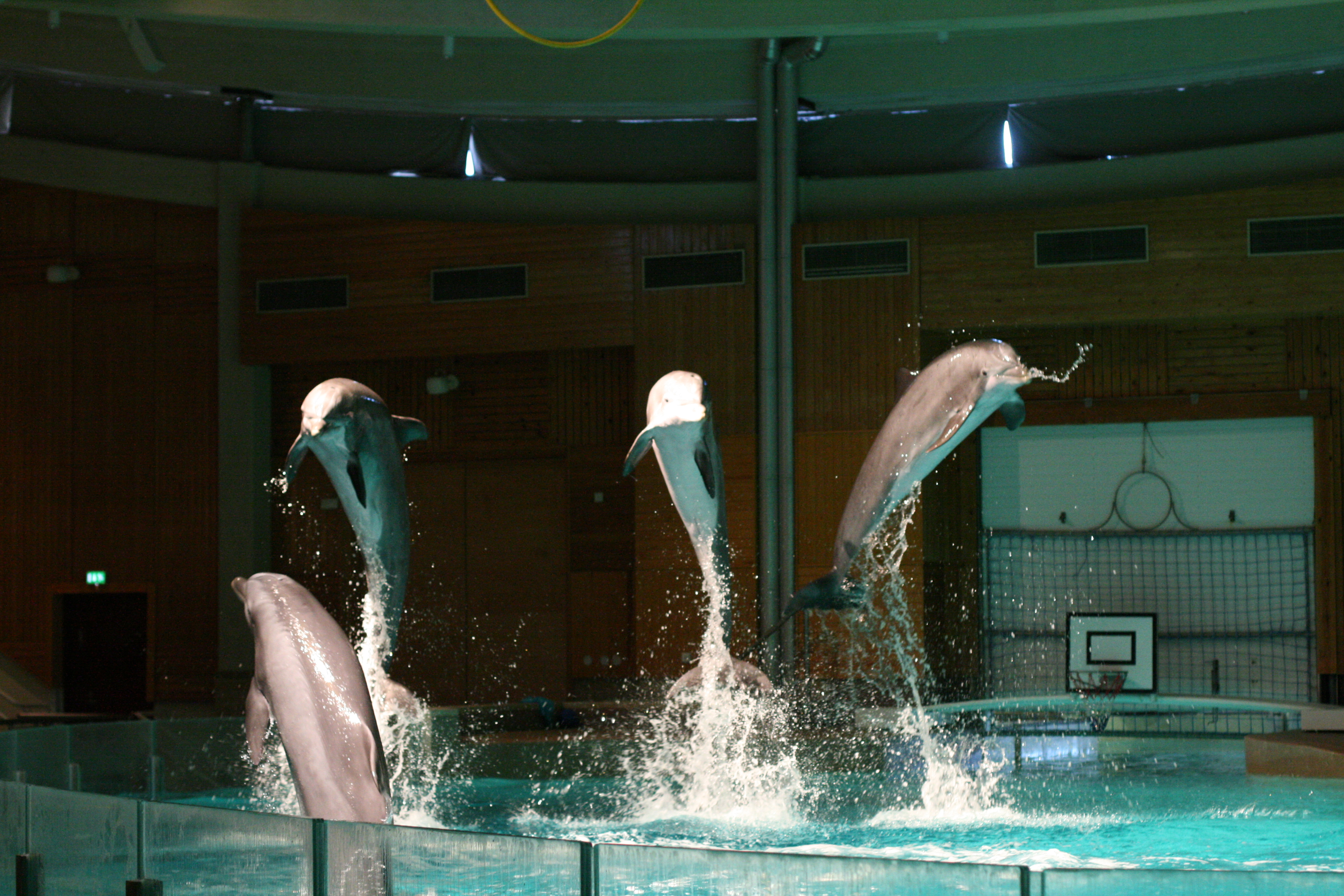
Särkänniemi Dolphinarium at Särkänniemi amusement park in Tampere, Finland, was formerly the most northern dolphinarium in the world. It operated from 1985 to 2016.

The water in the pools has to be constantly filtered to keep it clean for the dolphins and the temperature and composition of the water has to be controlled to match the conditions dolphins experience in the wild. In the absence of a common international regulation, guidelines regarding the minimum size of the pools vary between countries. To give an indication of pool sizes, the European Association for Aquatic Mammals recommends that a pool for five dolphins should have a surface area of 275 m^{2} (2,960 ft^{2}) plus an additional 75 m^{2} (810 ft^{2}) for every additional animal, have a depth of 3.5 m (11 ft) and have a water volume of at least 1,000 m^{3} (35,000 ft^{3}) with an additional 200 m^{3} (7,100 ft^{3}) for every additional animal. If two of these three conditions are met, and the third is not more than 10% below standard, the EAAM considers the pool size to be acceptable.

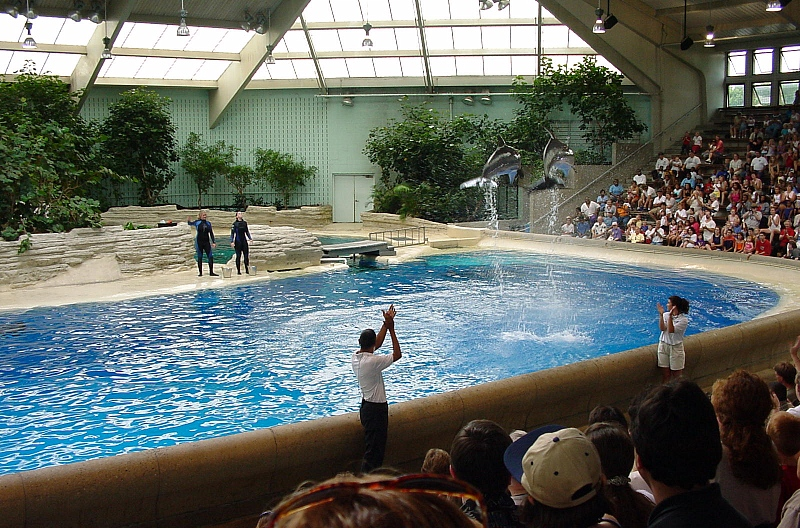
The Brookfield Zoo dolphinarium in Chicago

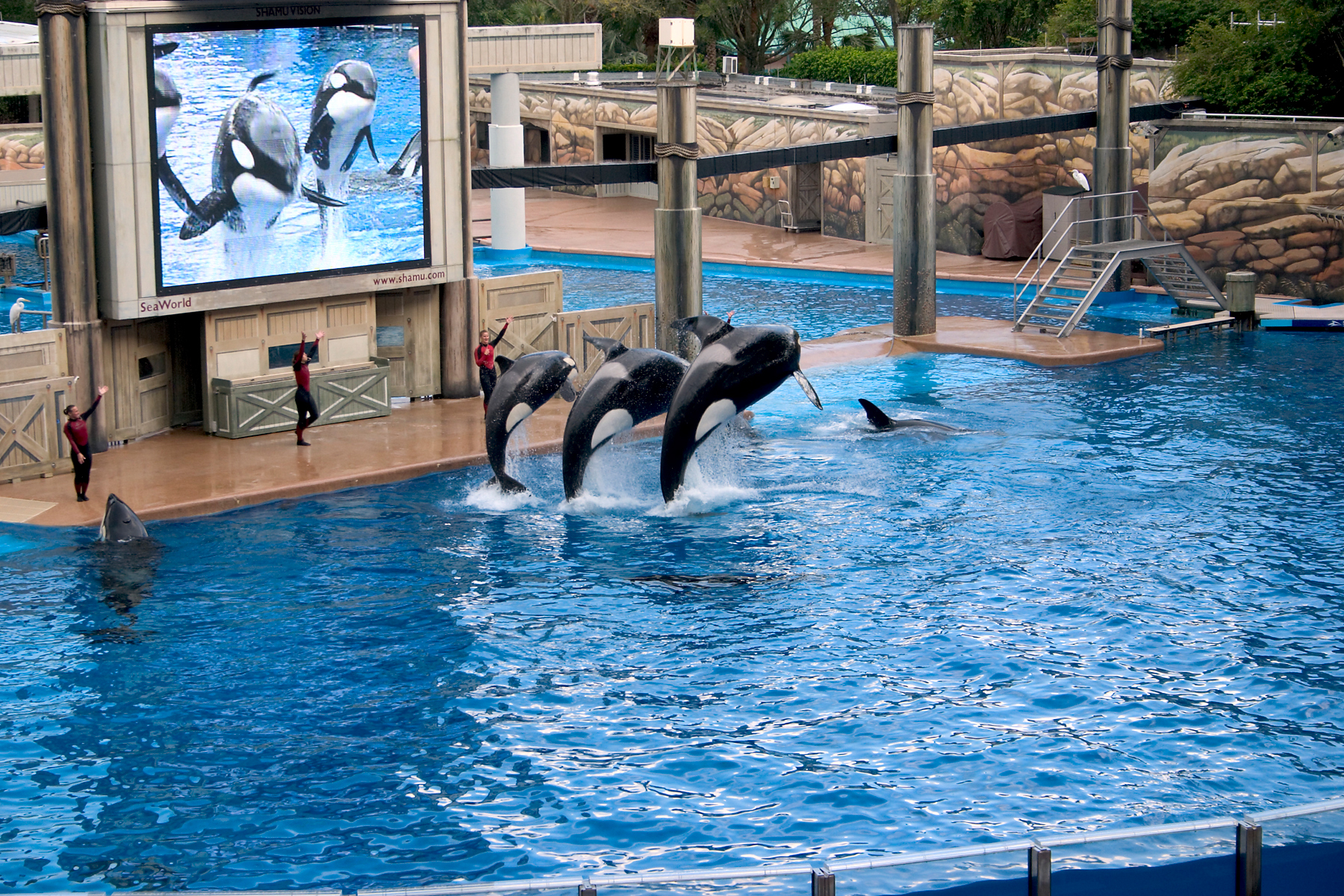
Killer whales performing in Shamu stadium at SeaWorld in Orlando, Florida

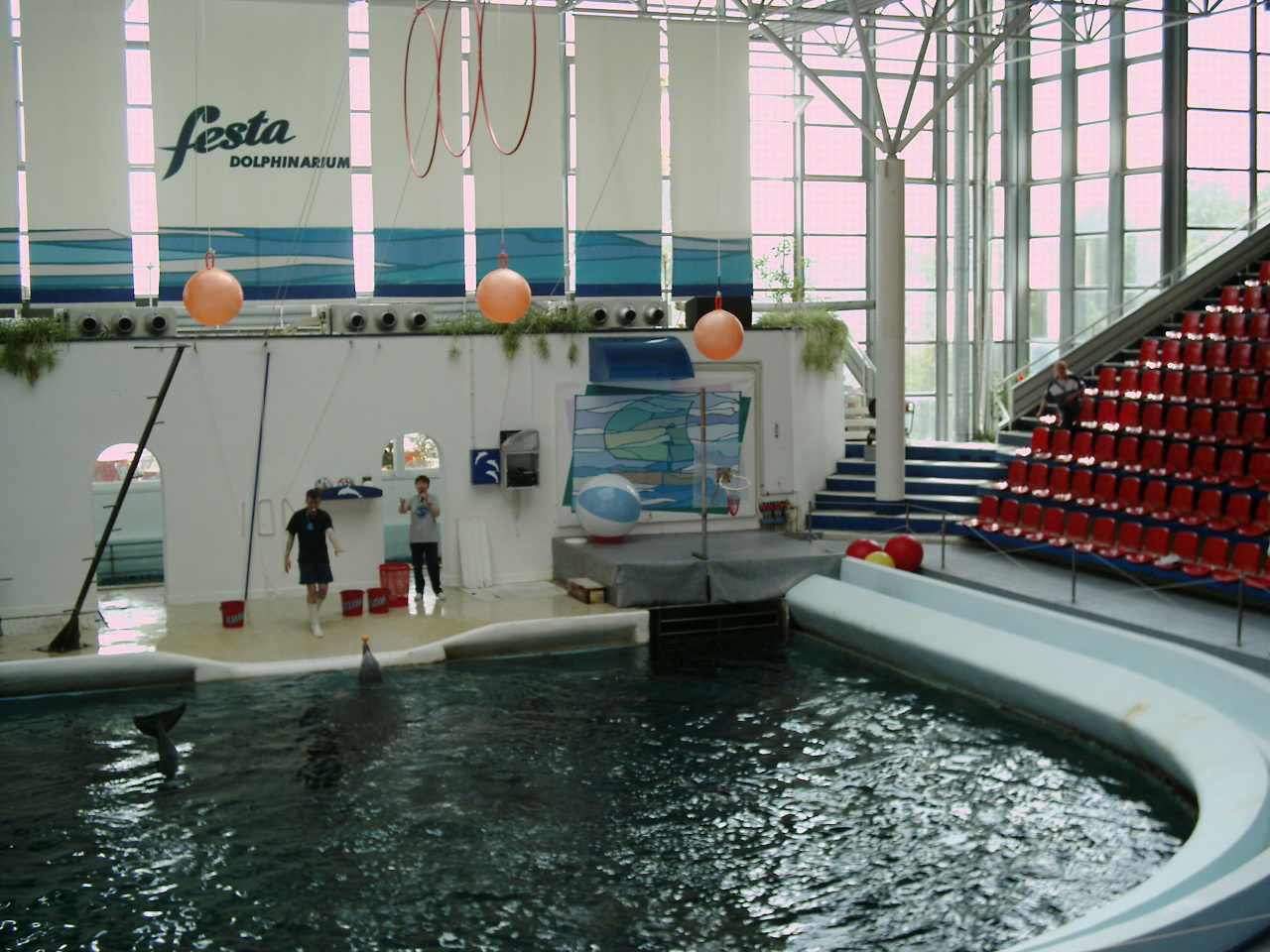
The Festa Dolphinarium in Varna, Bulgaria

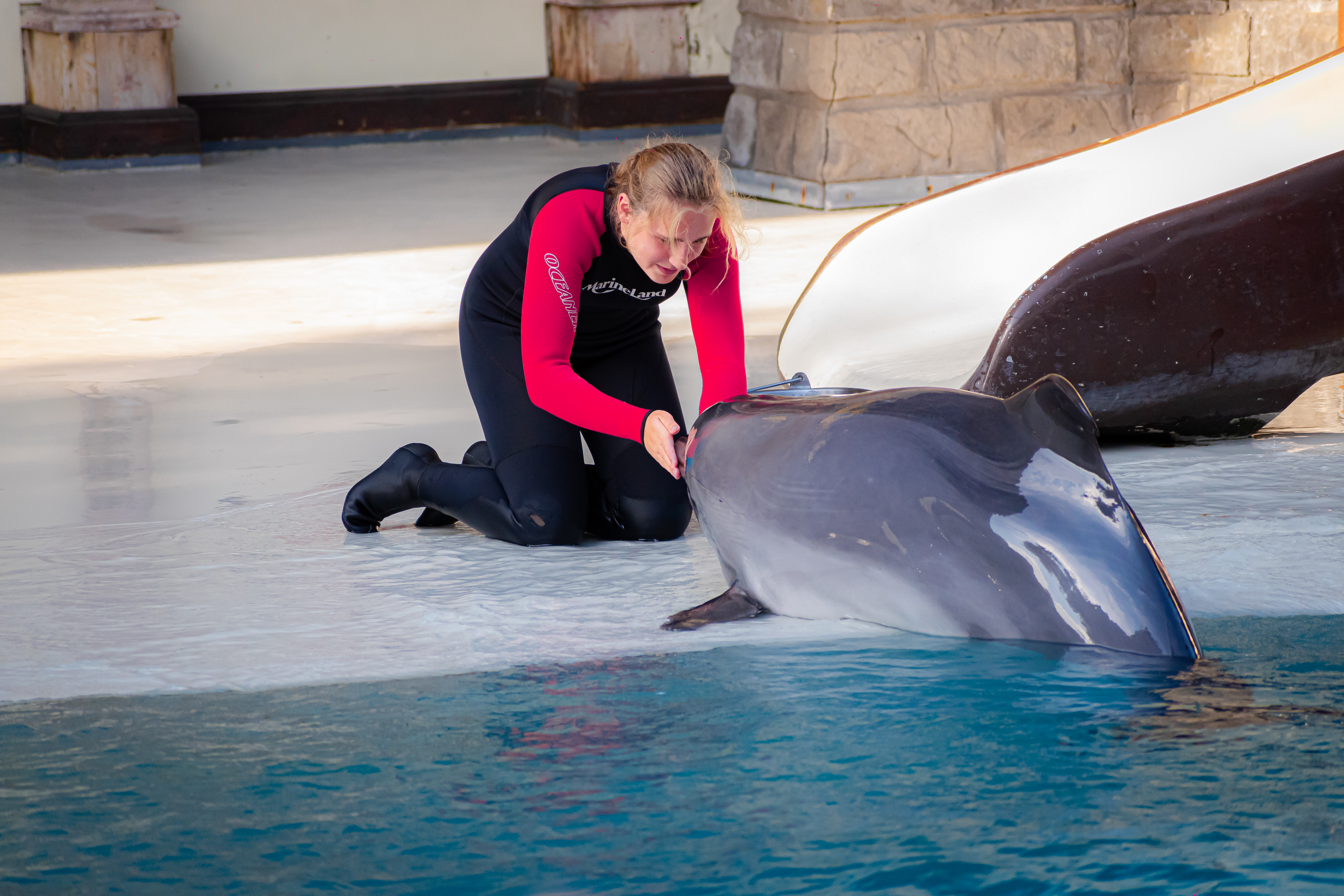
Dolphin show in Marineland, Niagara

== Animals ==
=== Species ===
Various species of dolphins are kept in captivity as well as several other small whale species such as harbour porpoises, finless porpoises and belugas, though in those cases the word dolphinarium may not be fitting as these are not true dolphins. Bottlenose dolphins are the most common species of dolphins kept in dolphinariums as they are relatively easy to train, have a long lifespan in captivity and a friendly appearance. Hundreds if not thousands of bottlenose dolphins live in captivity across the world, though exact numbers are hard to determine. Orcas are well known for their performances in shows, but the number of orcas kept in captivity is very small, especially when compared to the number of bottlenose dolphins, with only 44 captive orcas being held in aquaria as of 2012.

The majority of orcas are located in the various SeaWorld parks in the United States. Other species kept in captivity are spotted dolphins, gray whales, false killer whales, pilot whales and common dolphins, Commerson's dolphins, as well as rough-toothed dolphins, but all in much lower numbers than the bottlenose dolphin. There are fewer than ten Amazon river dolphins, Risso's dolphins, or tucuxi in captivity. Two unusual and very rare hybrid dolphins (wolphins, a cross between the bottlenose dolphin and the false killer whale) are kept at the Sea Life Park in Hawaii. Also two common/bottlenose hybrids reside in captivity: one at Discovery Cove and the other SeaWorld San Diego.

=== Trade and capture ===
Dolphin being loaded onto a truck after having been captured in a drive hunt in Futo, Japan

In the early days, many bottlenose dolphins were wild-caught off the coast of Florida. Though the Marine Mammal Protection Act, established in 1972, allows an exception for the collection of dolphins for public display and research purposes when a permit is obtained, bottlenose dolphins have not been captured in American waters since 1989. In most Western countries, breeding programs have been set up to provide the dolphinariums with new animals. To achieve a sufficient birth rate and to prevent inbreeding, artificial insemination (AI) is occasionally used. The use of AI also allows dolphinariums to increase the genetic diversity of their population without having to bring in any dolphins from other facilities.

The trade of dolphins is regulated by the Convention on International Trade in Endangered Species of Wild Fauna and Flora (also known as the Washington Convention or CITES). Endangered dolphin species are included in CITES' Appendix I, in which case trade is permitted only in exceptional circumstances. Species considered not to be threatened with extinction are included in Appendix II, in which case trade "must be controlled in order to avoid utilization incompatible with their survival". Most cetacean species traded for display in captivity to the public or for use in swimming with dolphins and other interaction programs are listed on Appendix II.

However, the dolphin trade still continues. A live bottlenose dolphin is estimated to be worth between a few thousand to several tens of thousands of US dollars, depending on age, condition and prior training. Captures are reported to be on the rise in the South Pacific and the Caribbean, Cuba has also been an exporter of dolphins in recent years, this being organized by the Acuario Nacional de Cuba. In recent years, the Solomon Islands have also allowed the collection and export of dolphins for public display facilities. A 2005 law banned the export of dolphins, however, this ban was seemingly overturned in 2007 when some 28 dolphins were shipped to Dubai.

== Criticism and legal bans ==
World laws on dolphinariums / marine mammal captivity: Nationwide ban on dolphinariums/marine mammal captivity / De facto nationwide ban on dolphinariums/marine mammal captivity due to strict regulations; Some subnational bans on dolphinariums/marine mammal captivity / Dolphinariums/marine mammal captivity are currently being phased out ahead of a nationwide ban; Dolphinariums/marine mammal captivity legal / No data

=== Animal welfare ===
Many animal welfare groups such as the World Animal Protection consider keeping dolphins in captivity to be a form of animal abuse. The main arguments are that dolphins do not have enough freedom of movement in pools, regardless of pool size, (in the wild, dolphins swim hundreds of miles every day) and do not get enough stimulation. Dolphins often show repetitive behavior in captivity and sometimes become aggressive towards other animals or people. In some cases, the behavior of dolphins in captivity also results in their own death.

The lifespan of dolphins in captivity is another subject of debate. Research has shown that there is no significant difference between wild and captive survival rates for bottlenose dolphins. This does not, however, reflect a global state of affairs: for example, bottlenose dolphins in captive facilities in Jamaica suffer from extremely high mortality rates.

Some scientists suggest that the "unusually high" intelligence of dolphins means that they should be recognized as "non-human persons". In 2013, the Indian Ministry of Environment and Forests prohibited the captivity of dolphins on these grounds, finding it "morally unacceptable to keep them captive for entertainment purpose".

=== Legal bans or restrictions relating to keeping cetaceans in captivity ===
According to animal rights organizations that monitor the subject, the following jurisdictions have full or partial bans on keeping dolphins in captivity: Bolivia, Canada, Costa Rica, Croatia, Cyprus, Greece, Hungary, India, Slovenia, Switzerland, Turkey, and the American states California, New York, and South Carolina. Other countries have laws so restrictive that is virtually impossible to keep cetaceans in captivity: Brazil, Luxembourg, Nicaragua, Norway, and the United Kingdom. France tried to ban keeping or breeding cetaceans in captivity in 2017, but the ban was overturned on technical grounds by the Conseil d'État in 2018. On 29 September 2020, Environment Minister Barbara Pompili announced that France's three remaining dolphinariums would be closed within the next 7 to 10 years, and no new dolphinariums could be opened, and no new marine mammals could be bred or imported.

- Belgium: On 31 August 2020, the Brussels Capital Region (which has no dolphinaria) announced it was working on a ban on any future creation of dolphinariums to safeguard the welfare of any marine mammals that might end up being kept within its territory. In November 2024, following earlier bans in Brussels and Wallonia, the Flanders region (home to the country's last remaining dolphinarium: Boudewijn Seapark in Bruges) followed suit, meaning that a country-wide prohibition on dolphinariums was to be implemented by 2037 at the latest, but possibly sooner. Reportedly, this made Belgium the 7th country in the world, alongside "India, Costa Rica, Chile, Croatia, Slovenia, and Cyprus, which have already implemented strict bans on the captivity of dolphins."
- Canada: In June 2019, the Ending the Captivity of Whales and Dolphins Act became law in Canada. Two facilities would be affected, Marineland of Canada and the Vancouver Aquarium. When passed in June 2019, Marineland was reported to have 61 cetaceans, while the Vancouver Aquarium had just one dolphin remaining. The law has a grandfather clause, permitting those cetaceans already in captivity to remain where they are, but breeding and further acquisition of cetaceans is prohibited, subject to limited exceptions.
- France: Since September 2020, a phaseout of dolphinariums has been in progress in France (to be completed by 2027/30).
- Mexico: The Chamber of Deputies amended the General Wildlife Law in October 2022 to prohibit the use of marine mammals in commercial shows or for subsistence. Animals currently kept in captivity could be kept for the rest of their lives, but using them in shows was no longer permitted. The Mexican Senate confirmed the ban in 2023, but as of February 2024, several theme parks and aquariums were refusing to comply, using legal means to delay the law's implementation, and seeking to overturn the ban.
- Spain: With more than 100 cetaceans in captivity, Spain had the most of any European country in 2023, according to World Animal Protection, and about ten dolphinariums were still operating. In April 2023 the #NoEsPaísParaDelfines campaign, led by the animal rights activist Olivia Mandle, delivered more than 154,000 signatures to the Congress of Deputies calling for a ban on dolphinariums; the animal welfare law passed in March 2023 had left dolphins out of its scope.
- Switzerland: Dolphinariums are not technically prohibited, but there have been no dolphinariums in Switzerland since 2013, and it is practically impossible to set up and run a new one. The Animal Protection Act was amended in May 2012, stipulating: "It is forbidden to import dolphins and other cetaceans (Cetacea)." Therefore, the last facility that still kept cetaceans in Switzerland decided to close its dolphinarium by the end of 2013.

== See also ==
- List of dolphinariums
- Marine mammal park
- Category:Films about dolphins
