= War Bonnet Round Up =

Idaho's oldest professional rodeo

War Bonnet Round Up Idaho's Oldest Rodeo
- Status: Active
- Genre: Rodeo
- Frequency: Annually
- Locations: Idaho Falls, Idaho
- Country: United States of America
- Years active: 114
- Inaugurated: 1911
- Next event: August 4 - August 7, 2027
- Participants: 450
- Attendance: 12,000
- Website: https://www.idahofallsidaho.gov/1923/War-Bonnet-Round-Up

The War Bonnet Round Up is Idaho's oldest professional rodeo. First held in conjunction with the county fair at Tautphaus Park September 5-8, 1911, the events consisted primarily of horse racing, with relay races staged by local Shoshone-Bannock riders from the Fort Hall Indian Reservation. The following year on September 23-27, 1912, the War Bonnet Round Up was officially inaugurated, and events included stagecoach races, four horse chariot races, wild mule riding, bull riding, steer riding, Indian cowboy racing, cowgirl bucking, bulldogging, Roman riding, championship bucking and trick roping and riding.

Aimed at preserving the country's western heritage, the War Bonnet Round Up is held every year the first week end in August. It is a PRCA (Professional Rodeo Cowboys Association) sanctioned event involving over 450 cowboys and cowgirls competing before more than 12,000 spectators. Originally held at Tautphaus Park, known as Reno Park from 1915-1932, it is now held at Sandy Downs Arena, a city-owned facility. Management of the rodeo was taken over by the Chamber of Commerce, followed for a time by the American Legion Department of Idaho Post 56. Today the City of Idaho Falls and its Parks and Recreation Department operate the rodeo. The Shoshone-Bannock tribes of Fort Hall continue to provide the most colorful component of the rodeo.

The War Bonnet Round Up was inducted into the Idaho Rodeo Hall of Fame in 2021. This organization is dedicated to preserving and promoting western American heritage and culture, honoring the people and organizations that have played a prominent role in the state's farming and ranching history.

== History ==
Early rodeos were influenced by Buffalo Bill's Wild West Show, the first of which was held in North Platte, Nebraska in 1882. The concept was to demonstrate and preserve pioneer and ranching lifestyles and to pay tribute to Native Americans. Early rodeos included Cheyenne Frontier Days, founded in 1897, the Pendleton Round Up, founded in 1910, the War Bonnet Round Up founded in 1911 and the Calgary Stampede, founded in 1912. Cowboys and cowgirls gained celebrity and fame as they traveled from one rodeo to the next to win cash and prizes. Town residents looked forward to the annual rodeo event with great excitement and anticipation. By 1913, with hotels filled to capacity, the city of Idaho Falls reached out to local residents to provide accommodations for out of town guests.

Idaho Falls held the first county fair at Tautphaus Park on September 6-9, 1910. The following year in 1911, a group of civic leaders decided to add new events which included Indian relay races involving 12 horses. A featured attraction was a trained horse named "College Maid – the Guideless Wonder". The mare would race around the track without a rider, then bow in front of the audience at the finish.

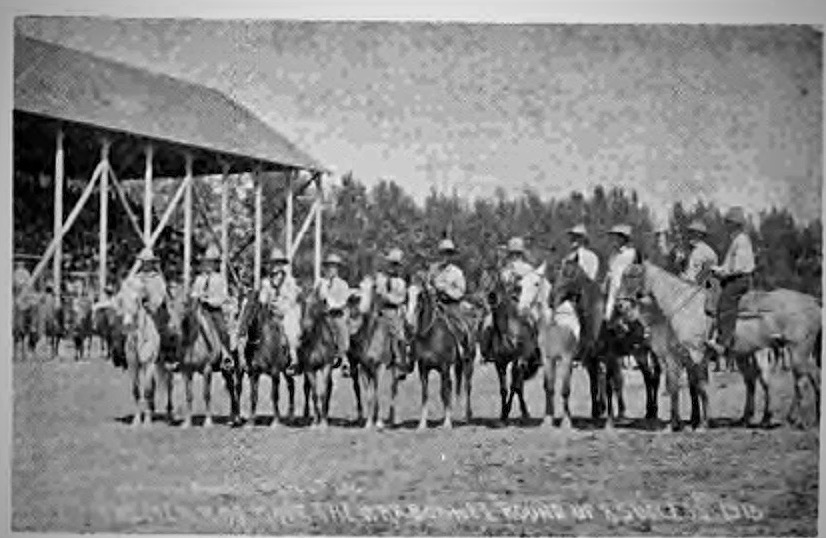
Eleven founders of the War Bonnet Round Up. Photo taken in 1913

The eleven men pictured: F. H. Churchill, real estate agent; J. I. Hubbel, grain dealer; M. B. Yeaman, owner and editor of the Idaho Falls Register; W. J. Coltman, shoe store owner; J. J. Hayball, harness maker and sheriff; Jack Neve, hotel operator; J. H. Heath, farmer; J. Frank Reno, stockraiser; Dow Williams, grain dealer; Billy Luxton, meat wholesaler and retailer; and Burt Empey, arena director.

The inaugural War Bonnet Round Up, held September 23-27, 1912, was so successful that in 1913 the grandstand at Tautphaus Park was enlarged to accommodate 5000 spectators. A big parade kicked off the first day of the War Bonnet Round Up. This included many Indians, cowboys, cowgirls and cowboy bands dressed in western regalia. Idaho Governor Haines attended the event to start off the parade. With the help of town leaders and merchants, $5,000 was collected to finance the 1913 War Bonnet Round Up.

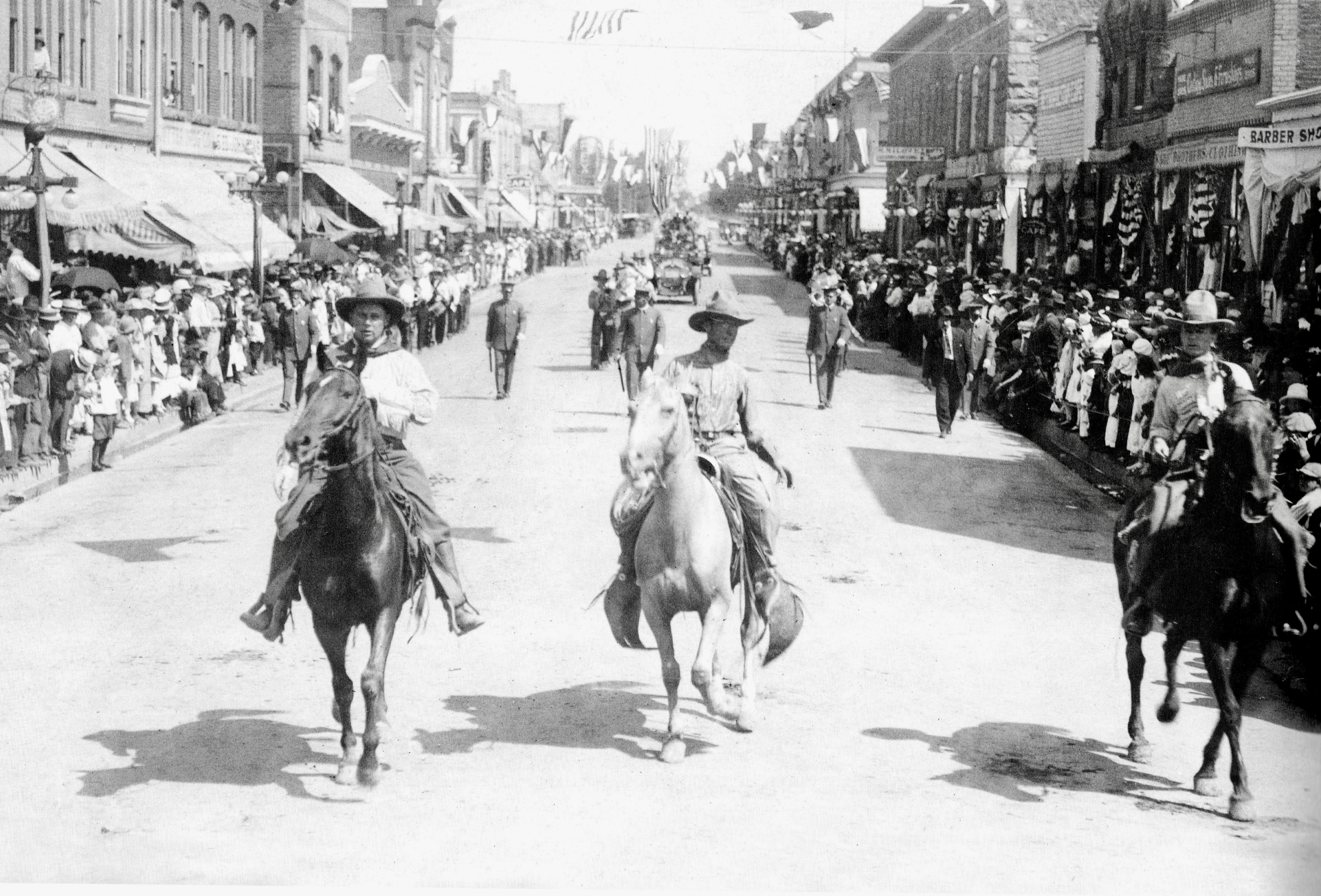
War Bonnet Parade, Idaho Falls 1915

In the early days, no chutes were provided. The stock was driven from a corral on the edge of the arena, then caught and saddled. Since no flood lights were available at the time, the shows were presented during afternoon daylight hours. The announcers used megaphones to broadcast the events. One feature attraction that was planned but canceled in 1912 was the "reenactment of the Battle of War Bonnet". Ten rounds of blank ammunition were to be used in the simulated fight, but the Indians refused to participate at the last minute.

== Early competitors ==
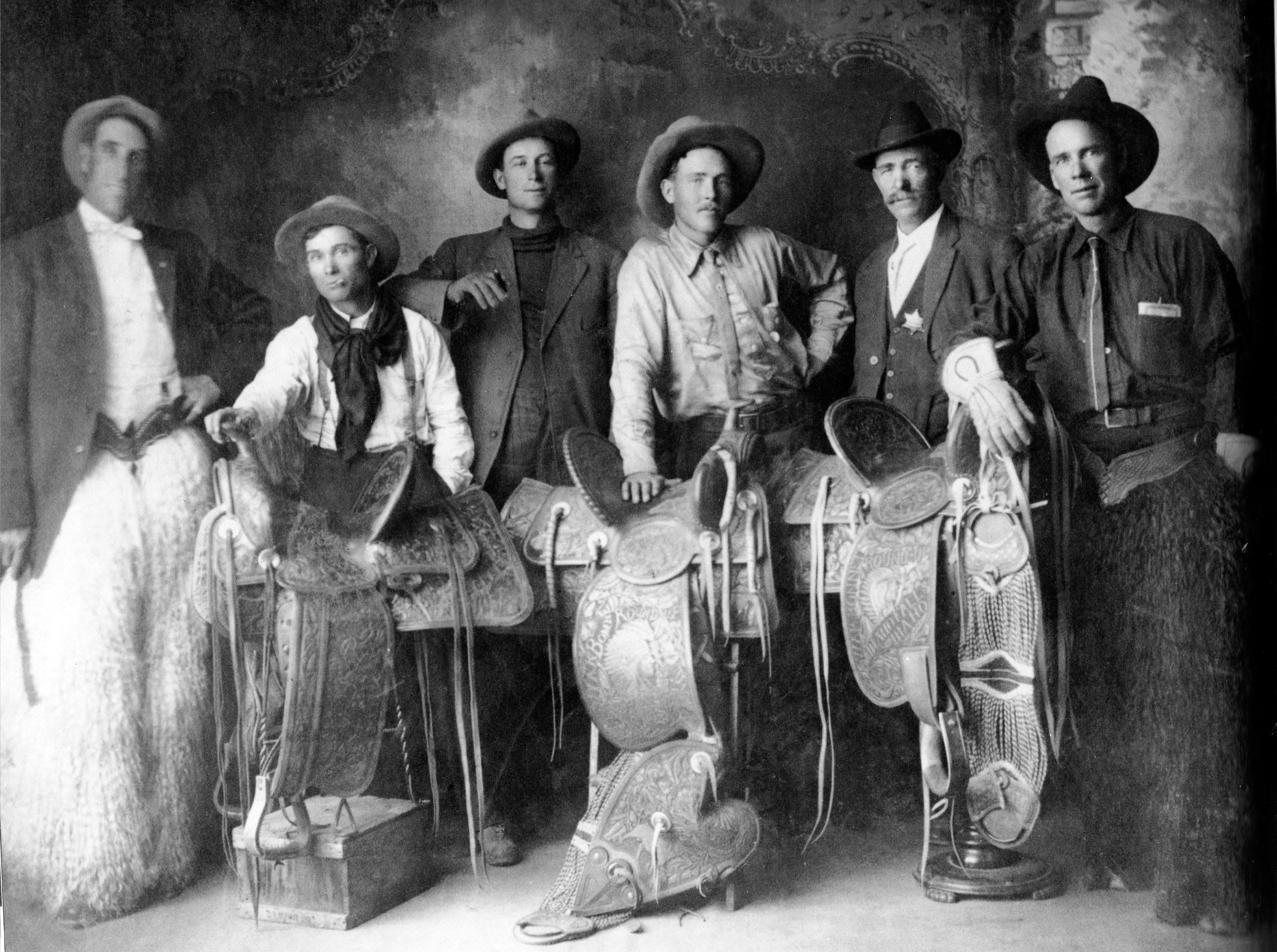
War Bonnet Round Up Winners and Promoters from 1912:Left to right: Eugene Hibbard, steer riding, Joe Williams, relay race, Walt Anderson, promoter, W.J.N. Adams, promoter, Jack Hayball, sheriff, Tom Pepper, calf and steer roping

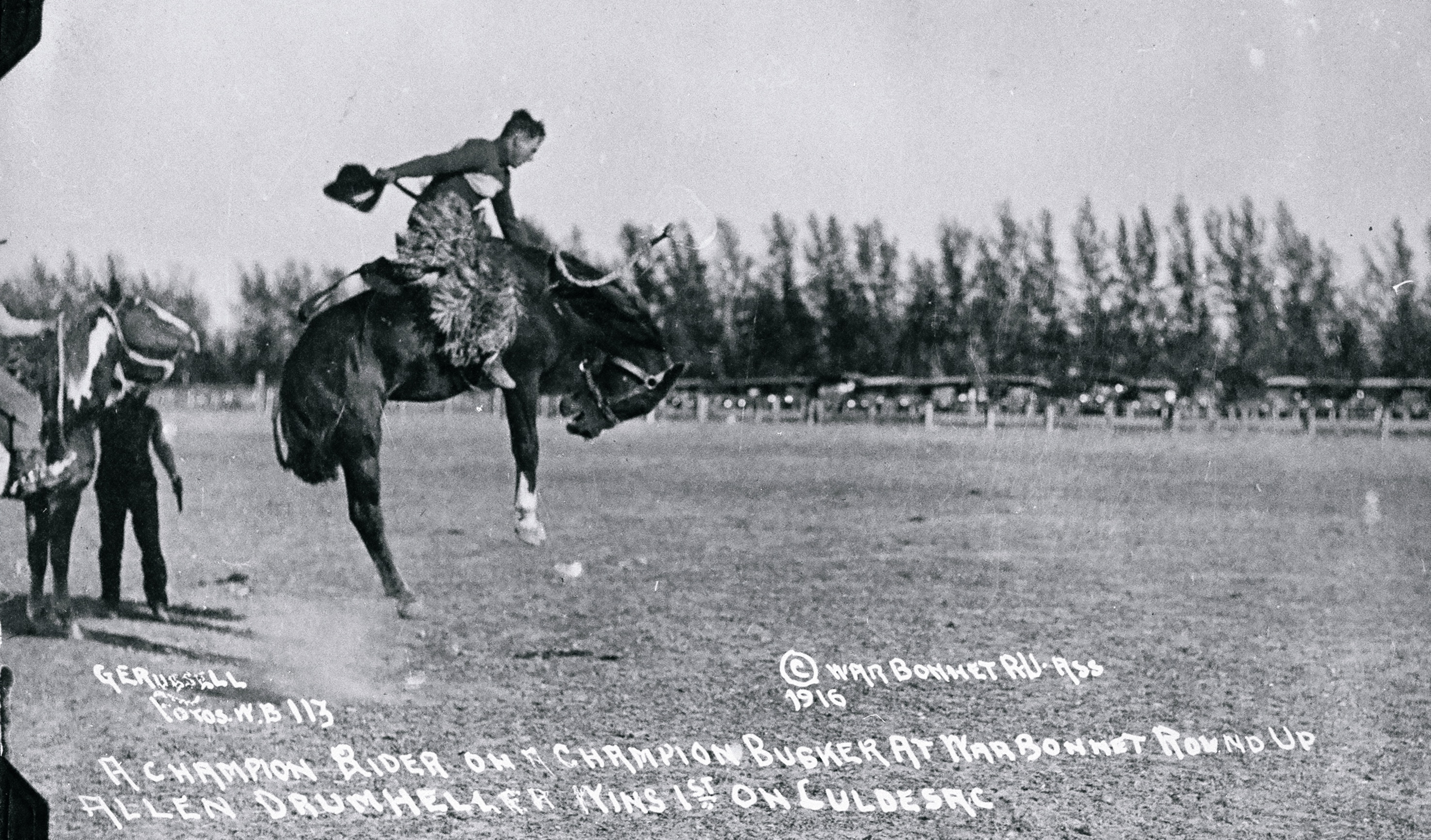
War Bonnet Saddle Bronc Rider Allen Drumheller 1916

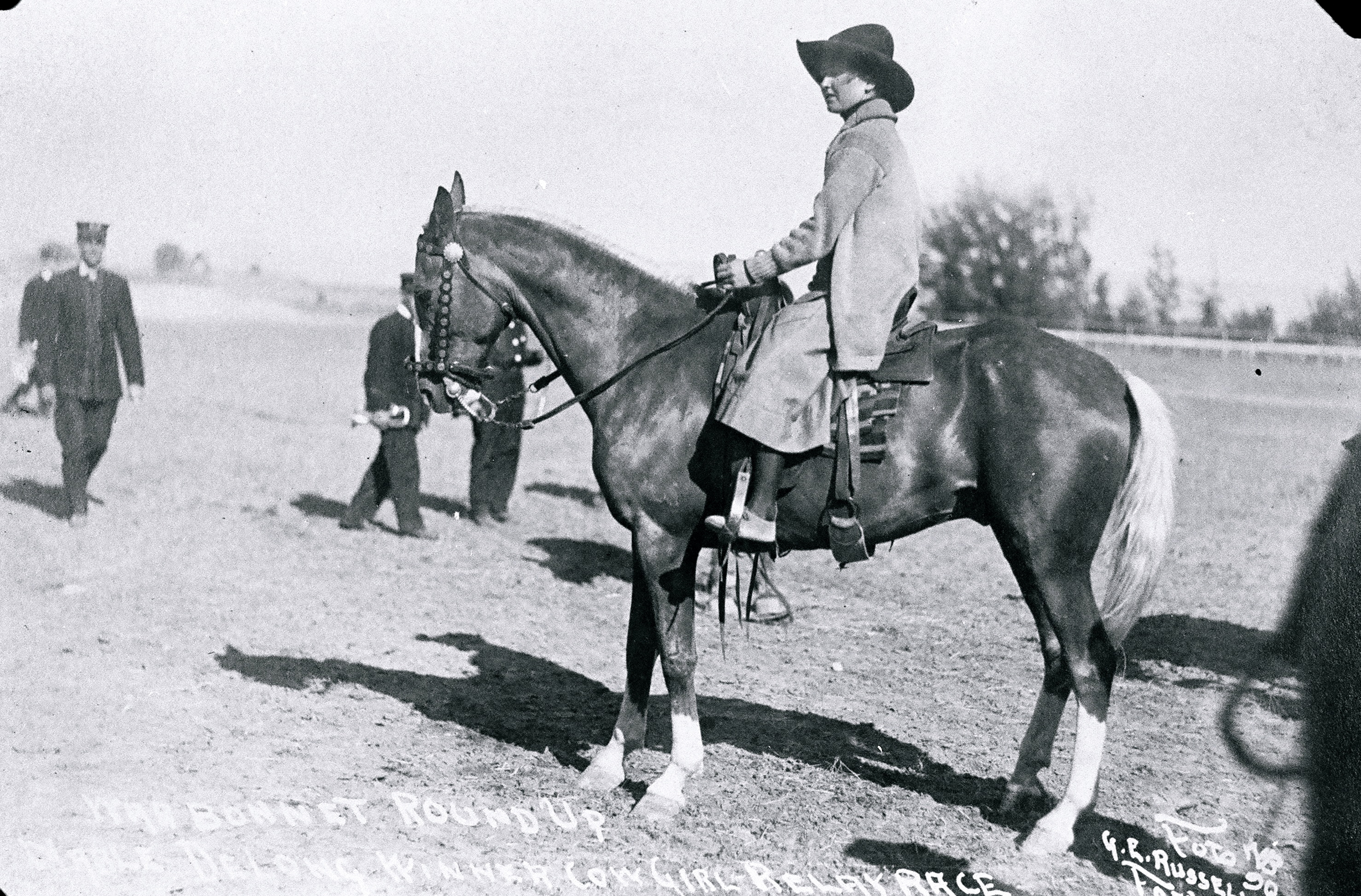
Mabel DeLong Strickland, War Bonnet Cowgirl Relay Race Winner 1916

While attendance at the War Bonnet ranked behind Cheyenne and Pendleton, the prize money totaled more than the other two combined. Because of this, it attracted notable performers such as the Weir Brothers, world champion ropers, Buffalo Vernon, who set the world record for steer roping in eleven seconds and bulldogging in four, Stub Farlow, formerly with Buffalo Bill and Hugh Strickland and his wife Mabel Strickland Woodward, relay riders. Perhaps the most famous contestants at the 1912 War Bonnet Round Up were Frank Gable and his wife Nan Aspinwall Gable. Frank had made a name for himself as the "greatest roper and rider this country has produced". In 1911, Nan became the first woman to ride solo horseback from San Francisco to New York in 180 days. Women contestants who competed alongside the men included Nancy Price, world champion bronco rider, Kitty Wells, Bonnie Gray, Bertha Kaepernik Blancett, Bonnie McCarroll and Annie Moran. Women competed along with the men in many of the events until the death of Bonnie McCarroll (1897–1929) in an accident at the Pendleton Round Up. In 1948 women resumed competition in PRCA events after the organization of the Women's Professional Rodeo Association (WPRA).

== Rodeo Photography ==
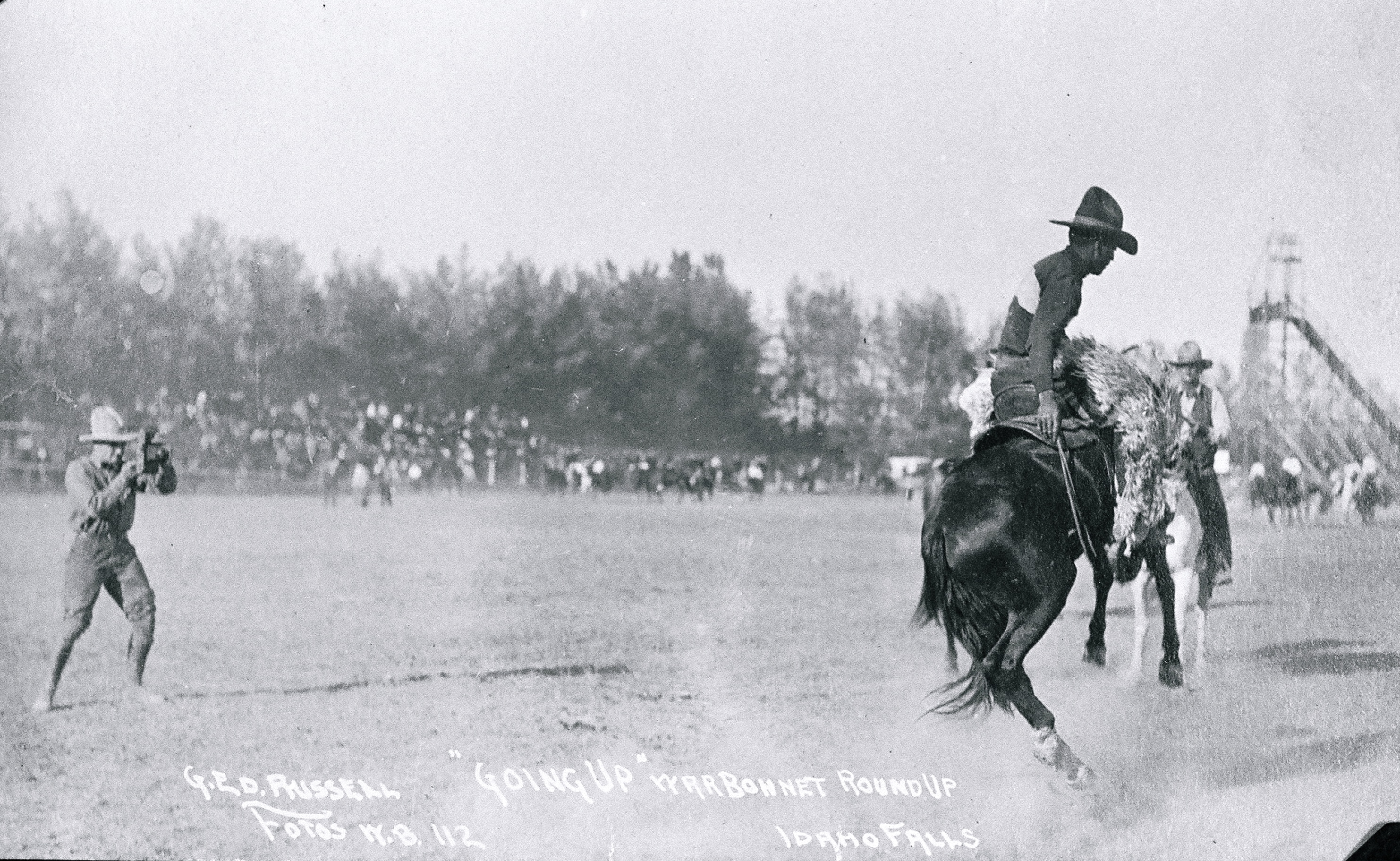
Allen Drumheller on saddle bronc, War Bonnet Round Up, 1916, photographer on left. In this photo there is a second photographer shooting images of a saddle bronc rider at a close distance.

Early rodeo photographer G. Ed. Russell captured the action at the War Bonnet Round Up. At the time, he was the staff photographer for the Idaho Statesman in Boise. This was a dangerous job requiring him to get close to the action without being injured. Photographers made their income selling rodeo photo postcards. The camera used at the time was a Graflex, a large format single lens reflex camera first introduced in 1898. The Graflex featured a focal plane shutter in the body capable of speeds up to 1/1000 of a second, which was popular for sports and press photography in the early 20th century.

== Rodeo Clowns ==
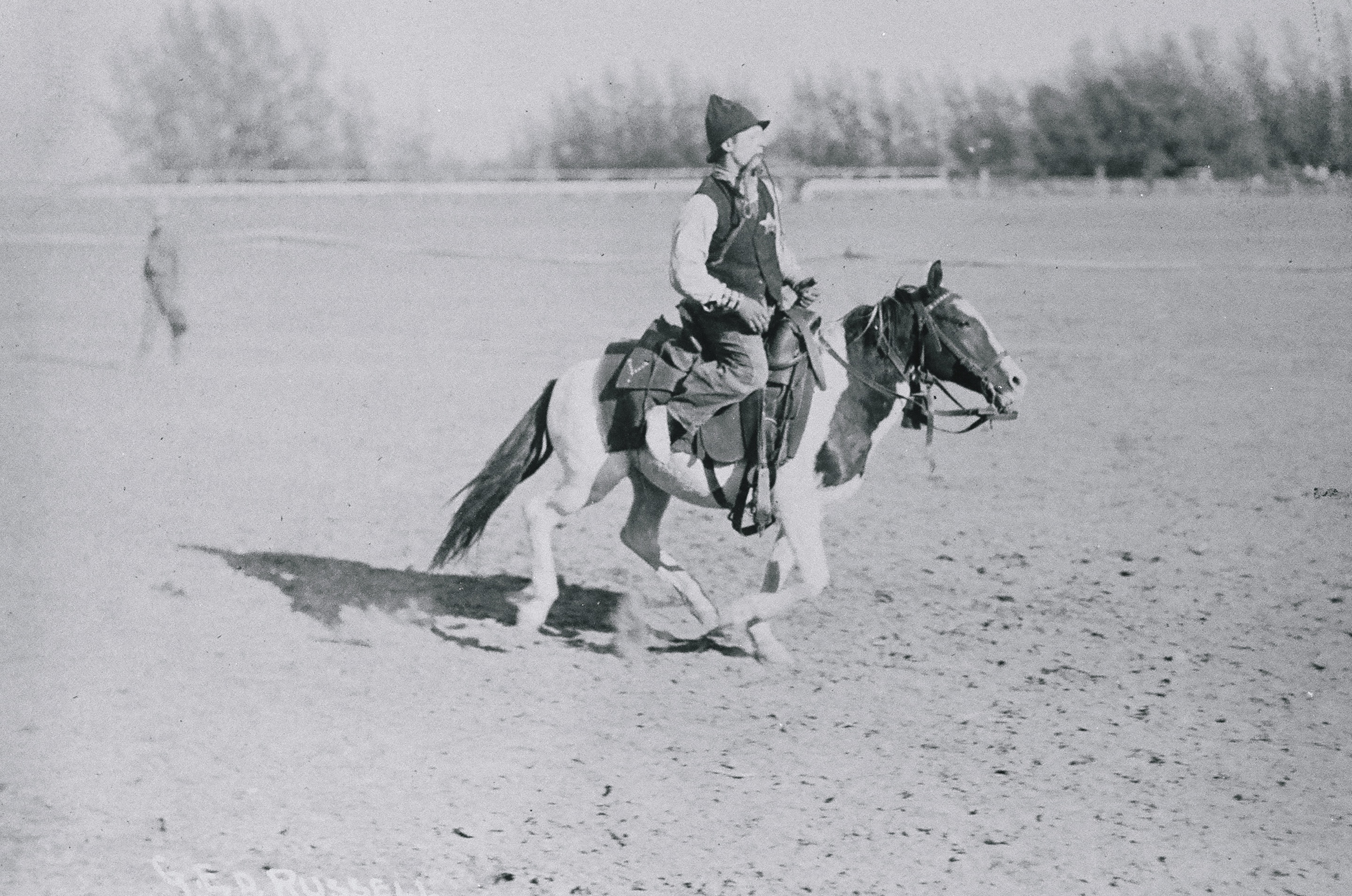
War Bonnet Clown and Trick Rider 1916

The early rodeo clowns at the War Bonnet Round Up played an important role for the safety of the competitors as well as the entertainment of the spectators, just as present-day rodeos feature clowns to assist with distracting animals from downed riders.

== The Cowpuncher ==
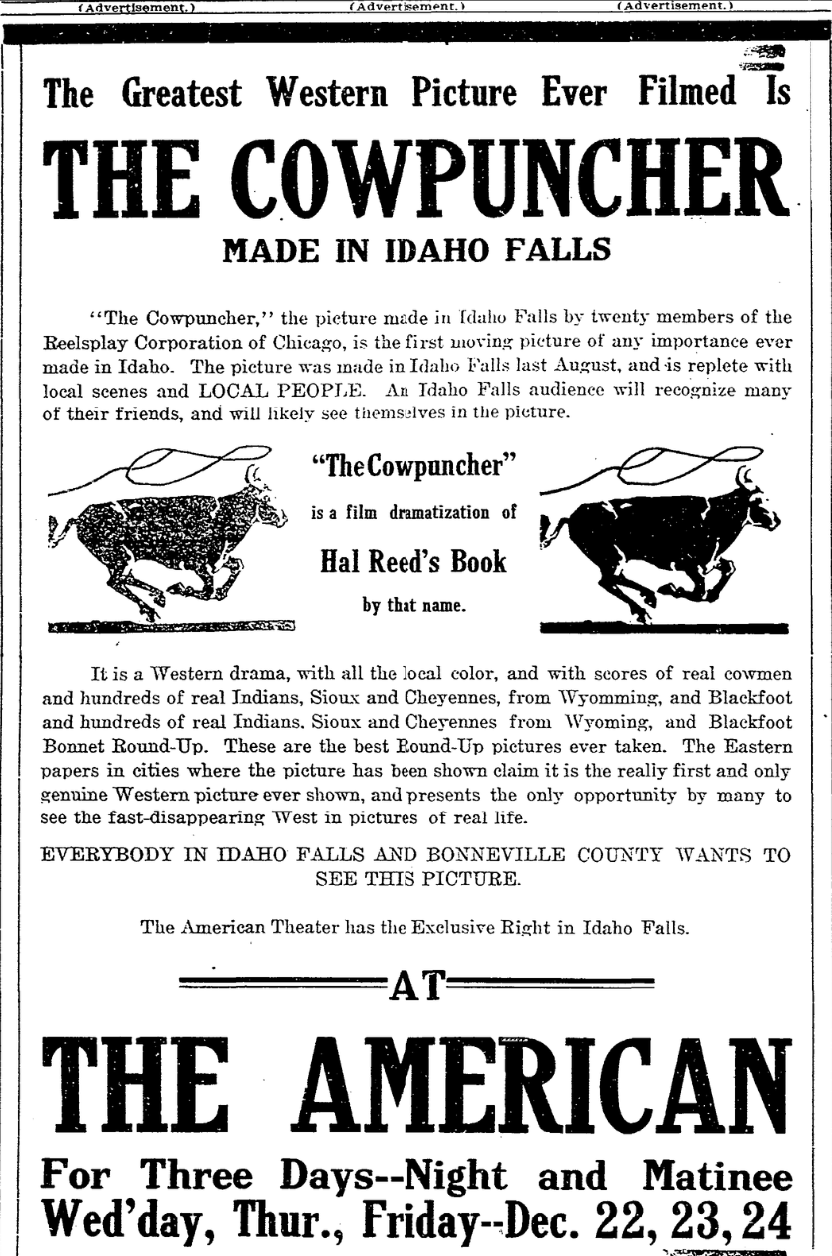
Cowpuncher Ad, Idaho Register, December 21, 1915

In 1915, Reelplays Corporation of Chicago produced Idaho's first full feature silent film at the War Bonnet Round Up and other locations near Idaho Falls. Directed by William Jossey and based on a play written by Hal Reid, the film had exclusive showings at the American Theater in Idaho Falls December 22, 23 and 24, 1915. No copies of the film remain today.

== War Bonnet Round Up Today ==
The War Bonnet Round Up has been held annually except for a few years during World War I, World War II and the COVID-19 pandemic. Today the Round Up is held the first week end in August. The action consists of two types of competitions – roughstock events and timed events. The roughstock events include bareback riding, saddle bronc riding and bull riding. The timed events are steer wrestling, team roping, tie-down roping, barrel racing and steer roping.

Breakaway roping, an additional WPRA timed event, was added by the War Bonnet Board in 2019. Though it was not a required event for the rodeo to be sanctioned, it was deemed inclusive for female athletes. Later that year, the WPRA Board of Directors launched a new award category titled Breakaway Trailblazer and the War Bonnet Round Up was the inaugural recipient.

For three consecutive years, 2022 - 2024, the War Bonnet has been awarded the "Best Medium Rodeo of the Year for the State of Idaho" by the PRCA Wilderness Circuit.

Each year a kick off event is held the evening before the start of the Round Up. The night features a mutton bustin' qualifier, free kid zone, food vendors and merchandise vendors.
