= Jackson Sundown =

Native American rodeo performer

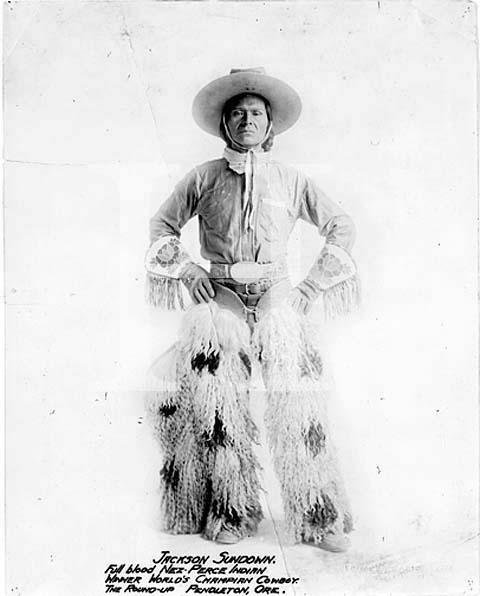
At the Pendleton Roundup, 1915 or 1916

Jackson Sundown (1863 – December 18, 1923), born Waaya-Tonah-Toesits-Kahn (meaning Blanket of the Sun), was a Native American rodeo rider who has become a folk-hero for his mythic performance in the 1916 Pendleton Round-Up, largely popularized by Ken Kesey's novel The Last Go 'Round.

Sundown was born in 1863, probably in Montana, into the visiting Wallowa Band of the Nez Perce, later led by Chief Joseph. The Nez Perce were renowned for their mastery of horses and Sundown learned how to breed and raise horses at an early age. By the age of 14 he was active in the Nez Perce War of 1877, but unlike Joseph and many of his tribesmen, Sundown escaped the U.S. Army cavalry during the Nez Perce Retreat and fled to Canada with a small group of wounded warriors. Legend holds that Sundown stayed for two years with a group of Sioux, including the iconic Sitting Bull. He was considered to be a war criminal and lived in hiding with Sitting Bull and others who played a role in the defeat of General George Custer at the Battle of Little Big Horn.

In 1879, Sundown returned to the U.S. and lived briefly at Nespelem, Washington, and then for many years on the Flathead Reservation in northwest Montana, where he married and had two children. He settled back in Idaho on the Nez Perce Reservation in 1910 and two years later married Cecilia Wapshela, a widow with two children and ranch owner, and they lived at her place at Jacques Spur, near Culdesac. All the while, Sundown made his living by breeding, raising, "breaking," and selling horses. To make additional money, Sundown entered into rodeos and dominated his opponents, many of whom would withdraw after learning that he would participate. Jackson Sundown won many all-around cash pots, which takes the highest average scores from all events, though he was best known for bareback and saddle bronc horse riding. His appearance differed greatly from other rodeo riders as he wore bright colored shirts, large and elegant woolen chaps and tied his long braids under his chin. Sundown entered into rodeos across the west and in Canada into his early 50s.

In 1915 at age 52, he took third place in the all-around at the Pendleton Roundup and decided to retire from rodeo, which had wrecked his body. The following year, an artist who was doing a sculpture of Sundown convinced him to enter the Roundup one last time, an offer that Sundown only accepted after the artist agreed to pay the entry fee . Sundown was twice the age of the other semi-finalists but advanced after high scores in the saddle bronc and bareback horseriding competitions. His final ride is an event of great mythology to this day among American Indians and rodeo aficionados. It is told that Sundown drew a very fierce horse named Angel and that the horse bucked so furiously that Sundown removed his cowboy hat and fanned the horse to get it to cool off, at which time he and the horse merged into one being. Sundown won the all-around event and became immortalized as a hero of the Confederated Tribes of the Umatilla, where members of the Nez Perce tribe also reside. Sundown died of pneumonia 7 years later at the age of 60 and was buried at Slickpoo Mission Cemetery near Jacques Spur, Idaho. At the time of his death, the U.S. Government did not consider Native Americans to be American Citizens.

A large gathering of Native Americans continues at the Pendleton Round-Up in Pendleton, Oregon where a pow-wow is held during the Round-Up, the second full week of every September. Stories of Waaya-Tonah-Toesits-Kahn continue to fill the air at this event among the drumming, fry bread, gambling and rodeoing.

== Legacy ==
- Pendleton Round-Up and Happy Canyon Hall of Fame, inducted in 1972.
- Rodeo Hall of Fame of the National Cowboy & Western Heritage Museum, inducted in 1976.
- American Indian Athletic Hall of Fame, inducted in 1994
- National Multicultural Western Heritage Museum, inducted in 2006.
- Idaho Rodeo Hall of Fame, inducted in 2018
- National Day of the Cowboy, Honoree in 2019

== See also ==
- Statue of Jackson Sundown
