= Statue of Aura Goodwin Raley =

Bronze sculpture in Pendleton, Oregon, U.S.

- Artist: Jeremy Werner
- Medium: Bronze sculpture
- Subject: Aura Goodwin Raley
- Location: Pendleton, Oregon, United States; 45°40′16.2″N 118°47′11.3″W

A bronze sculpture of Aura Goodwin Raley by Jeremy Werner is installed in Pendleton, Oregon, United States. The statue is installed on Main Street.

== See also ==
- Statue of Esther Motanic
- Statue of Jackson Sundown
- The Western Sheriff
