= Jan Youren =

American rodeo performer

Jan Youren (born 1943 in Boise, Idaho) is an American former professional rodeo cowgirl. She rode bareback horses and bulls, competing for 51 years and winning several world titles. She rodeoed until the age of 63, when she retired with five world championships in bareback bronc riding, 13 reserve championships in bareback, and 15 reserve championships in bull riding. She was inducted into the Cowgirl Hall of Fame in 1993. She was inducted into the Idaho Rodeo Hall of Fame in 2015.

== Life ==
Jan Youren was born in 1943 near Garden Valley, Idaho. Youren's father was a rodeo competitor. He competed in bareback bronc riding, bull riding, and wild horse racing. Youren was riding calves when she was about five years old, mostly at the Cattleman's convention. When she was 11 years old, her father came home saying that he had seen something she would really like. He explained about the girls riding bareback broncs and horses who were competing in a rodeo the same way men did. Sterling Alley, her father, put on his own rodeo for Youren just so she could ride. For Idaho, it was one of the first. “He entered me in every event. I’d never even seen a barrel race at that time,” she said. “I would have done anything for my dad, anything to get a little higher in my daddy’s eyes.” Regardless of her age and inexperience, she won the bareback brong riding and the cowriding events. Youren became dedicated to the bareback bronc riding event since her first ride. She won her first prize at the age of 11, in one of Idaho’s first rodeos for women.

== Career ==
Youren and some others established the Idaho Girls Rodeo Association. She also joined the Girls Northwest Rodeo Association when it was formed in 1957. In the beginning, Youren competed locally in a 600 mile radius. Starting in 1975, she joined the association that became today's Women's Professional Rodeo Association. She started competing in trips up to 1,500 miles long. While still competing, she got married (four times total). She bore 15 children. Youren has eight children, seven stepchildren, 64 grandchildren and over 100 great grandchildren. Her children sometimes traveled with her.

== Retirement ==
She rodeoed until the age of 63, when she retired with five world championships in bareback bronc riding, 13 reserve championships in bareback bronc riding, and 15 reserve championships in bull riding.
