= War Paint (horse) =

Saddle bronc riding horse

- Breed: Paint x Pinto horse
- Discipline: Saddle bronc
- Sex: Stallion
- Foaled: c. 1945
- Died: 1975
- Country: United States
- Color: Pinto
- Owner: Orrie Sommers, Christensen Brothers

Honors
- ProRodeo Hall of Fame; Ellensburg Rodeo Hall of Fame; Pendleton Round-Up and Happy Canyon Hall of Fame; Idaho Rodeo Hall of Fame

War Paint (c. 1945 – 1975) was a saddle bronc who was a three-time Rodeo Cowboys Association Bucking Horse of the Year. He won the award in 1956, 1957, and in 1958 he tied with another horse. He was inducted into four halls of fame, the most prominent being the ProRodeo Hall of Fame in 2011. War Paint was known for his bucking ability and his buck-off record, which was close to 90 percent.

== Early life ==
War Paint was foaled c. 1945 in the Klamath marsh on the Klamath Indian Reservation in Northern Klamath County, Oregon. He was raised by a Klamath Tribe member named Orrie Sommers. War Paint's sire was a big-boned Paint stallion who was registered as a Quarter Horse. The tribe could not break him. His dam was a wild and grumpy old Pinto mare whom they drove in a team. The tribe never tried to break War Paint's dam. Sommers gave the foal a Klamath name that means "painted horse". Sommers brought War Paint up as a bucking horse, as he raised many bucking horses. When War Paint was three years old, Hank and Bob Christensen of Christensen Brothers, stock contractors, bought him from Sommers.

== Bucking career ==
War Paint bucked at the highest professional level which was the Rodeo Cowboys Association (RCA), renamed to the Professional Rodeo Cowboys Association (PRCA) in 1975.

Christensen Brothers first tried out War Paint, who weighed 1,400 pounds (640 kg), in bareback bronc riding competition. However, they soon moved him to saddle bronc riding competition, where he excelled. In the 1950s he became known worldwide for his bucking ability. There was a certain rodeo historian who wrote that many bronc riders would say after "seeing the paint go was–'That spotted horse is the one I want'–but generally, after a seat on him, they'd be out there checking their eyesight the next time they got a chance to see him go"!

War Paint was an elite prospect of the Christensen Brothers from the beginning. It did not take long for the spotted horse to develop a reputation. His first jump out of the chute was potent, and he followed it up with a high, forceful kick. No cowboy could get past the second jump for his first few years of bucking. Bronc rider Manual Enos is known as the first to make a qualified ride on the horse.

One pickup man named Denny Jones, who worked at the Pendleton Round-Up in Oregon, compared the horse to ProRodeo Hall of Fame horses Midnight and Five Minutes to Midnight. "War Paint was still buckin' when he was 20 years old", claims Jones. War Paint performed many times at the Ellensburg Rodeo, where the crowd always appreciated him. World champion saddle bronc rider and hall of famer Deb Copenhaver elaborated, "That pinto is a sure day-money horse. He just bucks hard and keeps trying."

=== Bucking Horse of the Year ===
In 1956, saddle bronc world champion and hall of famer Casey Tibbs suggested an award for bucking horses. War Paint was voted the inaugural RCA "Bucking Horse of the Year" in 1956. The award presentation took place at the National Western Stock Show in Denver, Colorado, in January, 1957. Any horses that had bucked in 1956 were eligible to win even though the award ceremony took place the following year in 1957. The Rodeo Sports News presented the winner with a silver mounted bucking horse halter, which was decorative but also functional.

War Paint won the award again the next year in 1957. The award ceremony was again held in January of the following year, 1958. Stock contractors Beutler Brothers furnished all of the bucking horses for the National Western Stock Show's rodeo. The Christensen Brothers still brought War Paint to the ceremony to be presented for the award. The arena was packed with publicity personnel.

Match of Champions The 1957 World Champion Saddle Bronc rider, Alvin Nelson, attended the 1958 award ceremony. Nelson and War Paint had never met up. An exhibition ride was slated for the presentation. The chute gate opened, and War Paint jumped out in his typical high jump. Nelson was bucked off in two seconds. The Rodeo Sports News attempted to cover over Nelson's reputation by printing a story several months later that claimed War Paint had also bucked off Tibbs in the same manner.

Alvin Nelson was only 23 years old at the time. Casey and Deb Copenhaver had both tried the horse before. As seasoned bronc riders, they tried to help Nelson by adjusting the amount of rein. They made an error, and the measurement was too long. That is what actually resulted in a buck-off for Nelson. With War Paint, as Tibbs once said, "He was a horse that allows you no mistakes". Thus, War Paint showed again why he won the title.

In 1958 War Paint and a horse named Joker, owned by Harry Knight & Company, tied for the award. Harry Knight was a ProRodeo Hall of Fame and Canadian Pro Rodeo Hall of Fame stock contractor.

=== Outs ===
An out is a trip out of the bucking chute. A qualified ride is 8 seconds long. Some cowboys who rode War Paint for a qualified ride include Manual Enos who got the first qualified ride on him. Enos rode War Paint a few times. Enos, for example, rode War Paint for a qualified ride in Prineville, Oregon, in 1955 and once in Redmond, California, in 1959. Others who rode him include Kenny McLean in Ellensburg, Washington; Cecil Bedford in Prineville, Oregon, in 1952; Tuffy Federer in Eugene, Oregon, in 1953; hall of famer Bud Linderman in Klamath Falls, Oregon, in 1953; Bill Ward in Klamath Falls, Oregon, in 1954; Les Johnson in Redmond, Oregon, 1957; Jackie Wright in Roseburg, Oregon, in 1957; Les Johnson at the NFR in Dallas, Texas, in 1959; and Kenny McLean at the Pendleton Round-Up in 1962. Also Winston Bruce rode him at Angels Camp, CA in 1959..

Some notable cowboys who tried War Paint without success are Dick Pasco in Ellensburg, Washington in 1952; hall of famer Bill Linderman in Klamath Falls, Oregon, in 1953; Bill Ward in Prineville, Oregon, in 1954; Jim Nunes in Red Bluff, Oregon, in 1955; Bob Bailey in Prineville, Oregon, in 1955; Arlo Curtiss in Clovis, California; Joe Chase at the Pendleton Round-Up in 1957; J.D. McKenna in Red Bluff, California, in 1957; Ted Tufares in Lebanon, Oregon, in 1958; Dean Reeves at the Pendleton Round-Up in 1959; Tom Tescher at Red Bluff, California, in 1959, Don L. Jackson in Porterville, California, in 1964; Gene McBeth in St. Paul, Oregon, in 1966; Jim Bothum in Eugene, Oregon, in 1966; Casey Tibbs, and Deb Copenhaver.

=== End of career ===
In 1958, War Paint was approximately 11 years of age. The Christensen Brothers had bucked the horse for eight years, mostly in California and in the states north of it. Hank Christensen was known to say that the horse had no distinctive bucking pattern but just tried his hardest. The stock contractor spent $10,000 to insure the horse with Lloyd's of London, the first to do so. It was a great deal of money in that time period.

In 1959, the first National Finals Rodeo (NFR) took place. War Paint competed at the NFR for the first and only time, where he was ridden twice. He helped Jim Tescher and Les Johnson finish 1–2 in the Average race. War Paint's career lasted almost two decades. He finished his career off with an almost 90 percent buck-off rate. "If they got past those first three or four jumps, they'd ride him once in a while", explained Bobby Christensen Jr. “He came out so high and came down so hard those first three jumps; not many of them got past those”.

== Retirement and death ==
In 1966, at the Emerald Empire RoundUp, in Eugene, Oregon, War Paint bucked off Jim Botham. His owners had him unsaddled in the arena, and announced that he was retired. War Paint traveled 540,000 miles in his career. In his last season, he had 28 starts with 25 buck-offs.

War Paint lived into his 30s. In his retirement, the Christensen Brothers hauled him with the other horses when they took them to major rodeos to compete. Usually, it was rodeos like California Rodeo Salinas, St. Paul Rodeo, and Pendleton Round-Up. Both the fans and War Paint seemed to appreciate having their pictures taken together. When War Paint became very old and his health was declining, the stock contractors made the decision to euthanize him so he would not have to endure another hard winter. It was Kent Rothrock, a Pendleton rancher, who had the idea to have his body preserved.

War Paint died in October 1975. His owners accepted Rothrock's idea and had his body preserved by a taxidermist.

== Legacy ==
War Paint's preserved body is on display at the museum in the Pendleton Round-Up and Happy Canyon Hall of Fame in Oregon. In 2019, the Idaho Rodeo Hall of Fame inducted War Paint. In 2011, the ProRodeo Hall of Fame inducted War Paint. In 2001, the Ellensburg Rodeo Hall of Fame inducted War Paint and in 1969, the Pendleton Round-Up and Happy Canyon Hall of Fame inducted War Paint.

War Paint bucked off 90 percent of his riders over a two decade career. He had a signature dive which occurred within his first three jumps. The handful of riders that did ride him figured out how to get past that dive. He was popular with many different rodeo personnel and fans. Announcers were partial to calling his name. He received fan mail from everywhere.
