= Idaho Rodeo Hall of Fame =

Hall of Fame for rodeo

- Established: 2013
- Location: P.O. Box 562, Gooding, Idaho, 83330
- Type: Hall of fame
- Website: IRHF

The Idaho Rodeo Hall of Fame is a rodeo cowboy hall of fame. The hall of fame was established in 2013.

== History ==
The Idaho Rodeo Hall of Fame was established as a 501 (c)(3) non-profit organization on May 6, 2013. Lonnie and Charmy LeaVell are the founders of the organization. The actual charitable nonprofit status was received from the IRS on February 19, 2014. The IRHF hosts a reunion and induction ceremony annually every October.

== Organization ==
The Idaho Hall of Fame preserves and promotes the Western lifestyle and its heritage. The hall exists to dedicate the men and women in rodeo who contribute to ranching and farming through their sport. It also extends its reach to continue these western ways to the youth in the communities to ensure that these traditions continue for many generations. In 2015, the hall was awarded the Historic Preservation Recognition Award by National Society of the Daughters of the American Revolution.

== Inductees ==
Class of 2022

- Dan Ackley
- Darl Allred
- Andy Bowden
- J2 Brown
- Cassia County Fair and Rodeo
- Crystal Brothers Rodeo Inc.
- Rich Curtis
- Yo Curtis
- Bill Fullen
- Chris Holmes
- Greg Holmes
- Jim Kluesner
- Judy Kaufman Orozco
- John Quitana
- Shelly Kendall Reeves
- Butch Small
- Dave Smith

Class of 2021

- Jeff Bowden
- Vic Carman
- Kent Cooper*
- Helen Daniel*
- Skip Daniel
- Betty Schnell Freeman
- Scott Kesl
- Dean Harrington
- Ginger Harrington
- Lonnie LeaVell
- John Prater
- Mike Prater
- The Roser Family* (*Jim, Dan, Tim, Jon, Mark)
- Debra Stephens
- Jerry Thompson
- War Bonnet Round Up

Class of 2020

- Arlene Worley
- Caldwell Night Rodeo
- Casey McGehee
- Elaine Vail
- Gayle Gray
- Jeff Crockett
- Jerry Gorrel
- John Schoorl
- Lee Markholt
- Lonnie Hale
- Lyle Buhler
- Patti Kaufman
- Robin "Rob" Juker
- Sandy McCleod
- Snake Eater (Slash T Rodeo)
- Steve Kaufman
- Teri McCleod
- Tim Oyler

Class of 2019

- Jed Baker
- Katie Breckenridge
- Christensen Brothers
- Bobby Christensen
- Linda Christensen Parkhurst
- Sheri Christensen Smets
- Ronnie Koll
- Lewiston Roundup
- Clyde Longfellow
- Edie Longfellow
- Keith Maddox
- Joe Marvel
- Mike Marvel
- Pete Marvel
- Burel Mulkey
- Juanita O'Maley
- Jim Steen
- Rob Struthers
- Jon Taylor
- War Paint
- Hank Williams
- Jackson Sundown

Class of 2018

- Kirk and Stevia Webb
- Robert L. Tyler
- Arthur Louis Tyler
- Judi VanDorn Thacker
- Jonie James Smith
- Everett Prescott
- Ernie Sites
- Jim Fain
- Karen Fain
- Dee Pickett
- Zane Davis
- Shawn Davis
- Cody Bequeath
- Casey Bequeath
- Harry Charters

Class of 2017

- Kay Davis
- Larry Davis
- Lisa Rae Davis
- John Robert Davis
- Harry Hamilton
- Dean Oliver
- Jake Pope
- Katherine Pope
- Bingo (horse)
- Sue Ellen Smith
- Larry Smith, ICA Judge
- Gary and Bev Stone
- Johnny Urrutia

Class of 2016

- Earl Bascom
- Weldon Bascom
- Deanne Bell
- Edmund E. "Tex" Bouscal
- Earl E. "Tim" Bouscal
- Guy W. Cash Sr.
- LeRoy A. Hess
- L. Wardell Larson
- David R. Stoecklein
- Kelly Wardell
- Val Christensen
- Walter J. Parke

Class of 2015

- Troy Perkins
- Grant Roberts
- Jackie Parke Roeser
- Billy Stephens
- Bob Stephens
- Fred Stephens
- Jake Stephens
- Charley Stovner
- Danna Stovner
- Jim Vickers
- Sandy Vickers
- Jan Youren
- Bill Aller

Class of 2014

- Curtis Cutler
- Bill Edmo
- Frank Edmo
- Kesley Edmo
- Lamose Edmo
- Dennis Manning
- Bob Monroe
- Governor Butch Otter
- Marty Bennett

Class of 2013

- Karl Gibson
- Lonnie Hatch
- Albert VanDorn
- Irene Wilson
- Mickey Young
- Zeb Bell

Class of 2012

- Herb Ingersoll
- Lana Parker
- Tim Parker
- Darrel Wesley "Virg" Vail
- Blanch Angell

Class of 2011

- Karl U. (Bud) Bedke
- Howard Belyeu
- George Gentner
- Wendell R. Johnson
- Orla Knight
- Terry Reiter
- Pete Crump

Class of 2010

- Jim Fenstermaker
- Jim Gibbs
- Bob Johnson
- Chuck Palecek
- Jack Schild
- Dee Christensen

Class of 2009

- Tom Eddy
- Benny Freeman
- Bob Gill
- Delbert Jim
- Lonnie Leavell
- Pat O'Maley
- Dick Anderson

Class of 2008

- Neal Arave
- Mike Isley
- Dean Patterson
- Lonnie Wright
- Avon Young

Class of 2008

- Lloyd Brown
- Calvin Gorrell

Class of 2007

- Bill Hurd
- Alan Patterson
- Gene Schiffler
- Jasper Thomason
- Tom Webb
- Adrian Carlson

Class of 2006

- Buddy Hugues
- Allen Hunt
- Bud Jenkins
- Stan Potts
- Jim Siebel
- Jerry Twitchell
- Frank Davis

Class of 2005

- Rusty Houtz
- Bob Juker
- Ted Lisle
- Buddy Peak
- George Richmond
- Bud Roseberry
- Mo Sagers
- Bob Scarbrough
- Jay T. Smith
- Joe Black

Class of 2004

- Deb Copenhaver
- Danny Gorrell
- Kay Hunt
- Bob Schild
- Louie Vaughn
- Curley Angell

Class of 2003

- Bob Craig
- Earl Elsner
- Harvey Helderman
- Larry Robinson
- Coke High (horse)

Class of 2002

- Daryle Hobdey
- Karen James
- George Juker
- Sod Williams
- Dale Brown

Class of 2001

- Bud Godby
- Joe Leguineche
- Bob A. Robinson
- Ernie Stevens
