= Statue of Esther Motanic =

Bronze sculpture in Pendleton, Oregon, U.S.

- Medium: Bronze sculpture
- Subject: Esther Motanic
- Location: Pendleton, Oregon, United States; 45°40′26.3″N 118°46′46.1″W

A bronze sculpture of Esther Motanic is installed in Pendleton, Oregon, United States.

== See also ==
- Statue of Aura Goodwin Raley
- Statue of Jackson Sundown
- The Western Sheriff
