= The Western Sheriff =

Equestrian statue by Alexander Phimister Proctor in Pendleton, Oregon, U.S.

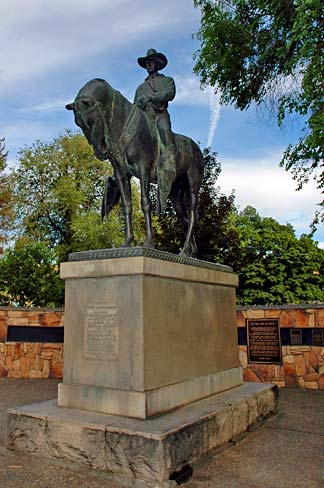
- Photograph of the statue
- Artist: Alexander Phimister Proctor
- Medium: Bronze sculpture
- Subject: Tillman Tyalor
- Location: Pendleton, Oregon, United States
- 45°40′24.5″N 118°46′46.7″W

The Western Sheriff is an equestrian statue of Umatilla County Sheriff Tillman Taylor by Alexander Phimister Proctor in Pendleton, Oregon, United States. The bronze sculpture is installed in Til Taylor Park.

== See also ==
- Statue of Aura Goodwin Raley
- Statue of Esther Motanic
- Statue of Jackson Sundown
