= Statue of Jackson Sundown =

Sculpture in Pendleton, Oregon, U.S.

- Artist: Greg Polutanovich
- Subject: Jackson Sundown
- Location: Pendleton, Oregon, United States; 45°40′23″N 118°47′16.4″W

A statue of Jackson Sundown by Greg Polutanovich is installed in Pendleton, Oregon, United States.

== See also ==
- Statue of Aura Goodwin Raley
- Statue of Esther Motanic
- The Western Sheriff
