= Funland (Idaho Falls) =

Amusement park in Idaho

Funland Amusement Park
- Interactive map of Funland Amusement Park
- Location: Idaho Falls, Idaho, United States
- Coordinates: 43°28′24″N 112°02′26″W
- Status: Operating
- Opened: 1947
- Owner: City of Idaho Falls
- Operating season: Spring through Summer

Attractions
- Total: 5
- Website: funlandatthezoo.com

Funland Amusement Park, commonly known as Funland, is a small amusement park located in Idaho Falls, Idaho, United States. Funland is situated within the 84.5-acre (34.2 ha) campus of Tautphaus Park, and it opened to the public in 1947.

== History ==
=== Early history ===
Tautphaus Park was established by Charles Tautphaus in the late 19th century when he made a six-acre lake and fed it with water from the Idaho Canal, which he helped create. It became a city park in 1910 and it was the center of many community events like rodeos and county fairs. In 1934, several log buildings were constructed throughout the park by the Works Progress Administration. Two buildings were built at the southwest corner of the lake and were used as changing rooms and restrooms for bathers. A group of businessmen obtained a lease from the city to open their chicken restaurant in the former dressing room building and operate amusement rides in 1947. The carousel was the first ride and others were added over the years.

=== 1950s–2019 ===
Equipment mechanic Leo Larsen eventually became the owner of Funland and continued to operate it under a lease with the city until 2000. At that point, Larsen sold Funland to Ann Rehnberg who continued to operate everything as it was until she sold it to the City of Idaho Falls in 2019.

=== City ownership: 2019-present ===
In 2020, a committee was formed to oversee the revitalization of Funland. A grand re-opening was planned for the 75th anniversary of Funland in 2022, but was delayed until the summer of 2023. The historic rides and buildings will be retained with several upgrades to the grounds. One addition is a central plaza with bricks etched with the names of donors. A ribbon-cutting ceremony was held on August 12, 2023.

== Rides ==
Name	Manufacturer	Details
Carousel	Allan Herschell	
Eli Wheel	Eli Bridge Company	Formerly known as the Ferris Wheel, it has now assumed the name given to it by the manufacturer.
Octopus	Eyerly Aircraft	Octopus was manufactured in 1938 and originally operated at the Utah State Fair before relocating to Funland around 1949.
Airplane Swings	Bisch-Rocco	This is the second plane ride at Funland. It replaced a smaller version that had a lower capacity.
Train		At least two train rides have operated at Funland. The first was an electric train made in Italy and traveled in a circle. Another train called the Streamliner operated in the 1967. The current train travels around an oval track

== Other attractions ==
Name	Details
Log Hut	This 1934 building is one of several in Tautphaus Park that were built as part of the Works Progress Administration. In 1947 it was turned into a restaurant and an arcade was added much later. One original feature that still remains is a fireplace on the south wall of the north portion of the building.
Miniature Golf	Added in the 1960s with some custom-made obstacles. A new course using the original obstacles is planned to return in the future.

== Former rides ==
Name	Details
Planes	The first plane ride was from Liberty Park in Salt Lake City, Utah and had a lower capacity than the current model.
Streamliner	Operated around the 1960s and traveled through a long tunnel east of the other rides that was later used for storage. The tunnel was demolished in 2020.
Train	This was an electric train made in Italy that traveled in a circle. It was replaced in 1990 by the current train that travels an oval track.
