= Tautphaus Park =

Historic park in Idaho Falls, Idaho

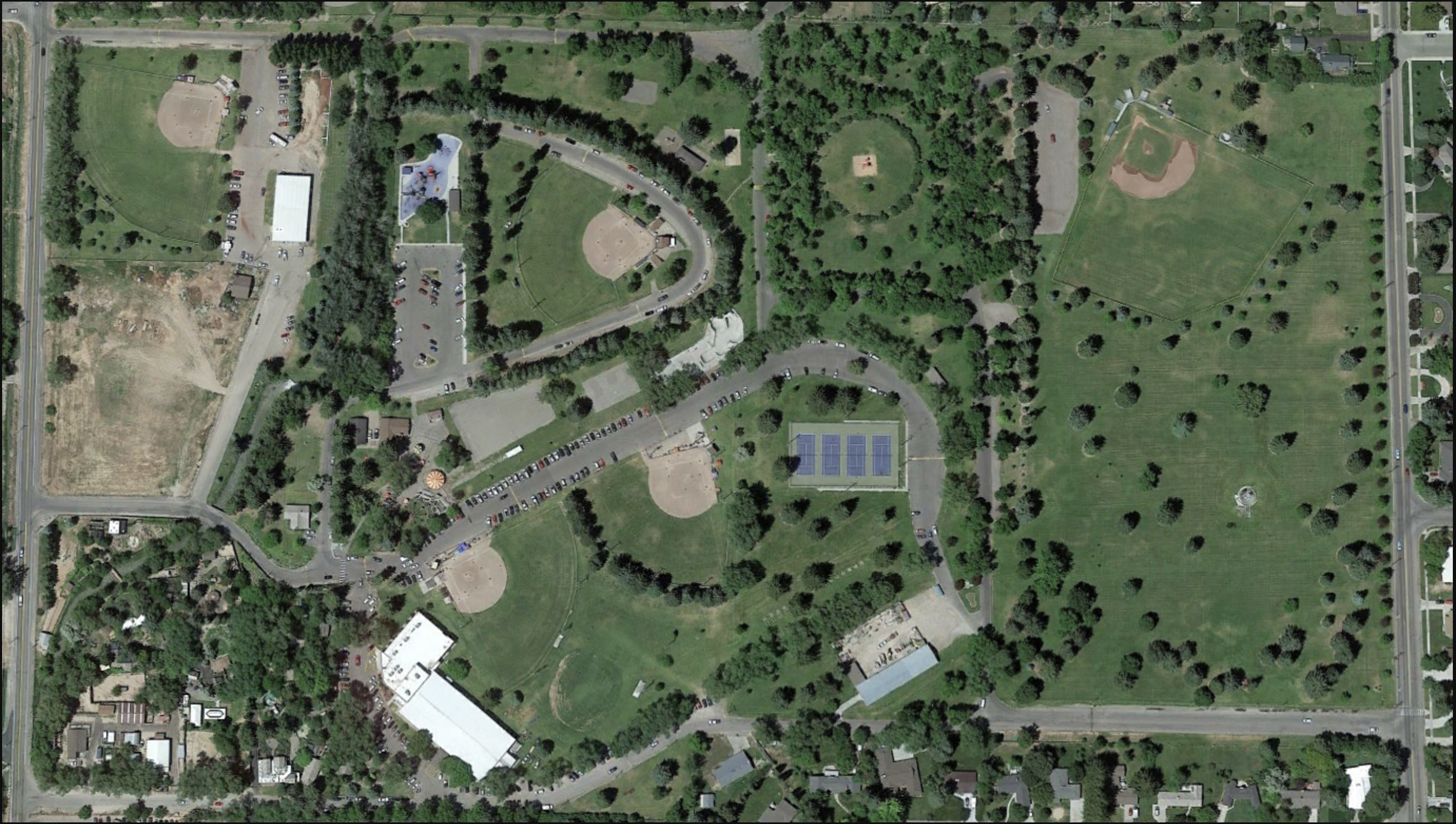
- Tautphaus Park Aerial View
- Interactive map of Tautphaus Park
- Type: City Park
- Location: Idaho Falls, Idaho United States
- Coordinates: 43.4737°N 112.0394°W
- Area: 84.5 acres (34.2 ha)
- Opened: 1909
- Operator: City of Idaho Falls Department of Parks and Recreation
- Status: Open year round
- Website: https://www.idahofallsidaho.gov/facilities/facility/details/Tautphaus-Park-48

Tautphaus Park is a city park located in Idaho Falls, Idaho encompassing 84.5 acres. Park amenities include Funland Amusement Park, Idaho Falls Zoo at Tautphaus Park, Joe Marmo/Wayne Lehto Ice Arena, softball and baseball fields, tennis courts, four picnic shelters, basketball court, skateboard park, all access playground equipment, horseshoe pits and restroom facilities.

== History ==
=== 1884 – 1906 – Tautphaus Ranch ===
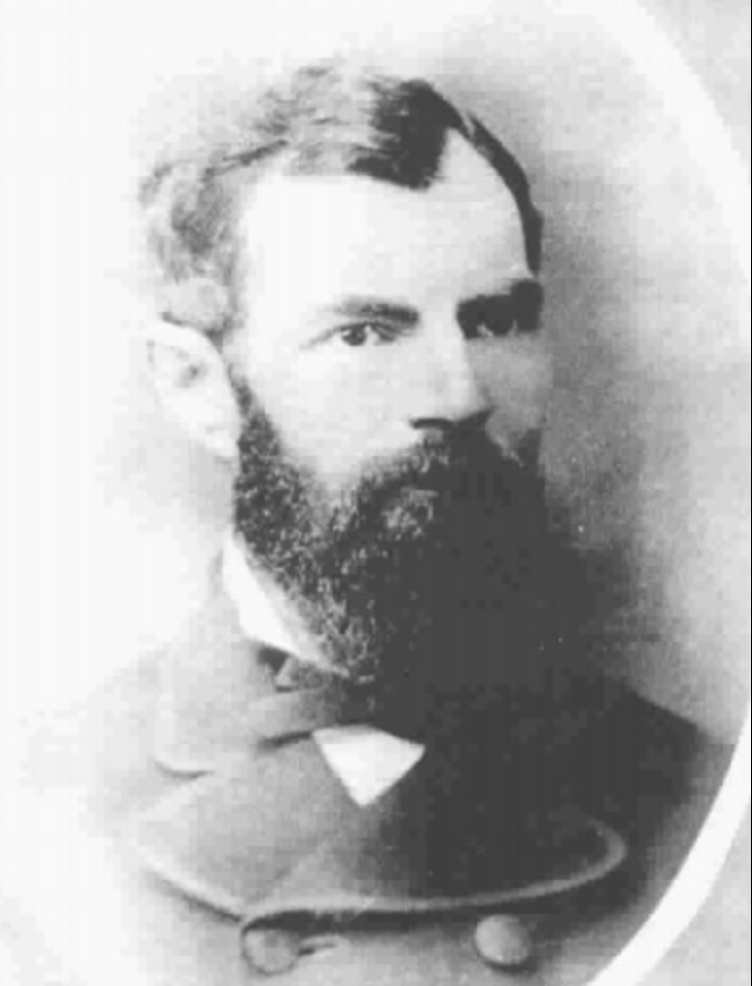
Charles Christopher Tautphaus

The property where Tautphaus Park is located was originally part of a 636-acre Desert Land Act patent claimed by Charles Tautphaus, deed issued in 1890. The Desert Land Act of 1877 was intended to encourage settlement and irrigation of semi-arid lands of the Western United States. The claimant was required to show proof of reclamation, irrigation and cultivation over the course of 3 years, after which time, for a payment of $1.25/acre, the deed could be issued. In the case of Charles Tautphaus, the process of claiming and giving final proof to the Government Land Office in Blackfoot, Idaho took 6 years.

Charles Tautphaus, a German immigrant, was born in 1846, birth date confirmed by his Civil War volunteer enlistment record dated January 5, 1865 at which time he was 18. He met and married his Irish immigrant wife Sarah Kane Tautphaus in Alameda, California where their 5 daughters were born. The family relocated to Butte City, Montana in 1881 where Charles Tautphaus operated a butcher shop. He filed his claim on the acreage encompassing present-day Tautphaus Park in 1884 and proceeded to build a series of canals, a reservoir and a ranch over the subsequent 6 years. The family eventually moved from Montana to Eagle Rock, Idaho, now Idaho Falls, in 1890 when the deed was issued. The canals he built are named Butte Arm, Gustafson Lateral and Idaho Canal and still exist today. A park-like setting was created around the 6 acre reservoir with trees, shrubs and grass. The reservoir would later be referred to as a “lake”.

After hosting many private parties at their home, in 1904 the Tautphaus family began toying with the idea of opening their property to the public as a park. Charles Tautphaus’ untimely death from pneumonia in 1906 while freighting in Tonopah, Nevada put an end to this dream. During his 60-year lifetime, Charles Tautphaus held many careers, including butcher and miner, but his lasting legacy is his irrigation of the semi-arid lands of Eastern Idaho and his namesake park.

=== 1909 – 1914 – Tautphaus Park ===
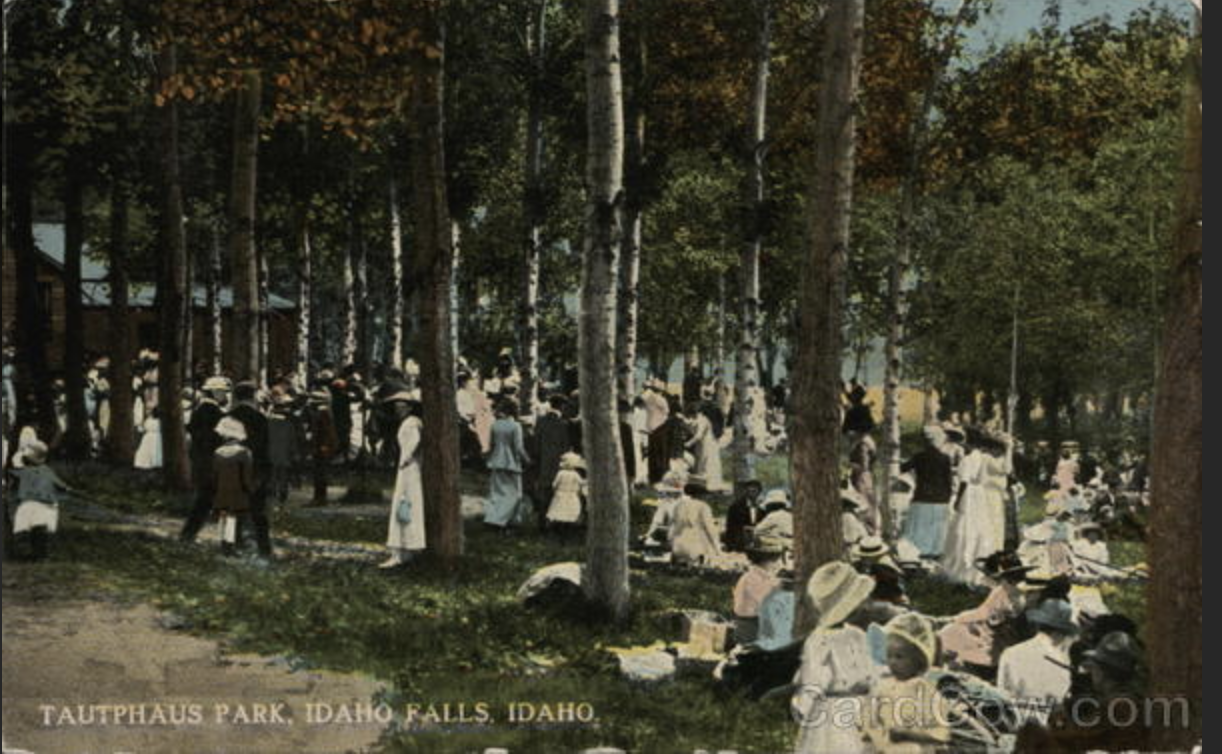
Tautphaus Park Postcard dated 1914

Following Charles Tautphaus’ death, his widow Sarah was unable to maintain the ranch. One daughter, Elizabeth Marie, aka Lillie, operated a poultry company on the property for a short time. In 1909, the Idaho Falls Boosters Club purchased the 160 acre ranch from Sarah Tautphaus for $35,000 with the intent of selling 100 acres for suburban homes and to build a fair ground and city park on the remaining 60 acres.

Tautphaus Park was dedicated on Pioneer Day, July 24, 1910 and the first Idaho Falls Fair was held on September 6–9, 1910. While it was a huge success, it lacked a large exhibition hall which was constructed a year later in time for the 1911 fair.

In 1911 the Boosters Club reorganized into the Idaho Falls Fair Association. The summer of 1911 Tautphaus Park was the scene of the 4th of July celebration, Pioneer Day celebration and the county fair.

By 1912 a grandstand was erected in time for the first War Bonnet Roundup Rodeo which was held in conjunction with the annual fair.

During the years of park development by the Fair Association, Tautphaus Park drew huge crowds to celebrations of 4 July, Pioneer Day, the county fair and the War Bonnet Roundup. It was also a place where the public could enjoy a picnic, boat or swim in the lake and ice skate in the winter.

In 1914 the Fair Association was financially unable to continue operating the park and title reverted to widow Sarah Tautphaus.

=== 1915-1932 – Reno Park ===
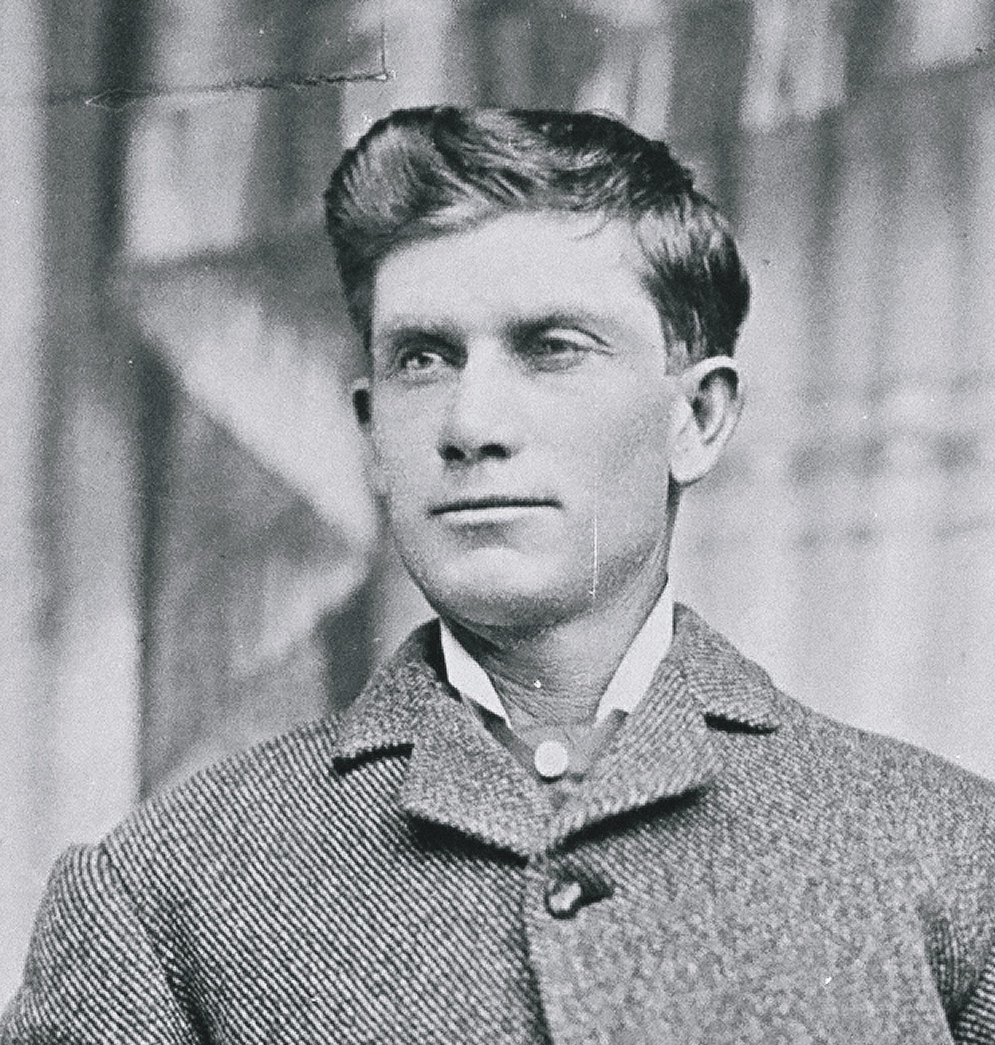
Jerome Frank Reno

In 1915 the park property was purchased by local rancher and business man, Jerome Frank Reno who changed the park's name to Reno Park. Frank Reno, as he was known, was a long time friend of Charles Tautphaus and a founding member of the War Bonnet Roundup Rodeo. The Tautphaus and Reno families were both Catholic and benefactors of their local parish. In an Idaho Falls Times article published Feb 10, 1916, Smith Realty Company describes brokering the sale. Buyer Frank Reno is quoted as explaining his desire to honor the memory of Charles Tautphaus: “That as nearly as it was possible for a living friend to carry out the wishes of a friend who is gone, he should do so.”

Like Charles Tautphaus, Frank Reno was a pioneer of Eastern Idaho. Born in 1855 in California, he moved to Idaho as a young man settling on a homestead property on Birch Creek in Alturas County (now Butte County) in 1886 with his wife Agnes Boletta Callahan Reno and their 6 children. Over the next 14 years, Frank amassed several thousand acres of property where he raised cattle, sheep and horses. Irrigation was a key factor in the success of the Reno Ranch, located 40 miles northwest of Idaho Falls. In 1914, the Reno family purchased 243 N. Ridge Avenue in Idaho Falls from prominent business man W.H.B. Crow. The Renos would ultimately own 4 homes in that block of North Ridge Avenue, including 273 North Ridge, which later became Wood Funeral Home.

In 1915 Reno Park was the setting for the silent film The Cowpuncher, filmed at the War Bonnet Roundup Rodeo by Reelplays, Corp of Chicago. The first motion picture to be filmed entirely in Idaho, it has since been lost to history.

Reno Park remained a public park during the Reno ownership, hosting 4 July and Pioneer Day celebrations, the county fair and War Bonnet Roundup Rodeos. Amenities were added to accommodate the local baseball team as well as a dance hall. Visitors continued to have access to the lake and picnic areas.

After Frank Reno's death in 1925, the family continued to operate the park until it was lost during the Great Depression in 1932. The Reno family owned and operated the park for 17 years.

=== 1934 – 1943 – City Park ===
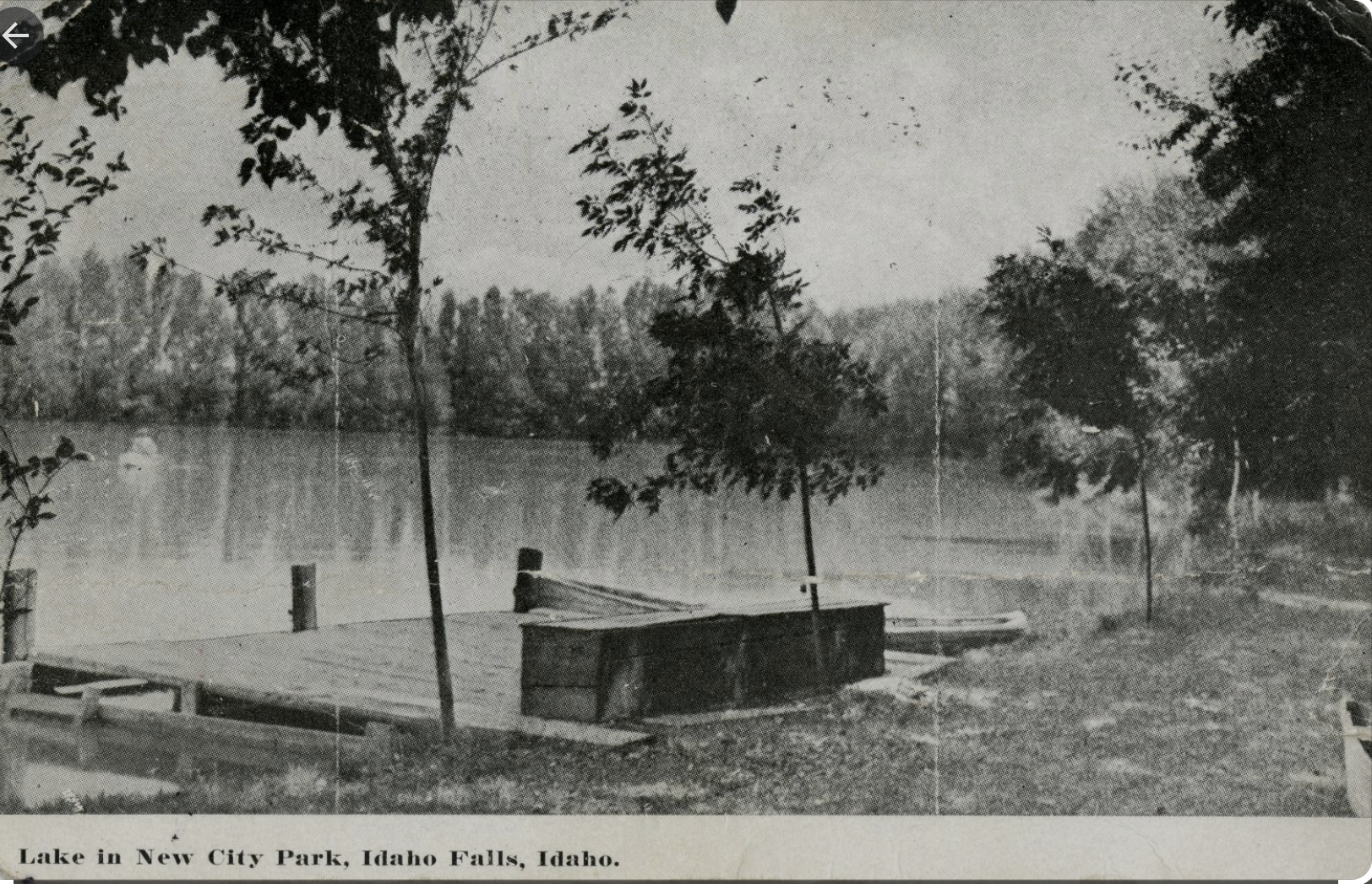
Postcard of Tautphaus Park Lake from about 1935 after it became City Park

The City of Idaho Falls purchased the 61 acre park property from American National Bank in 1934 for $13,500. An additional 24 acres was purchased in 1942 for $7,944. The name was changed to City Park in 1934, but local residents continued to refer to it as Reno Park until 1943 when a group of citizens petitioned the City Council to change the name back to Tautphaus Park.

In 1934 the Works Progress Administration approved funding for log structures and other improvements to the park. These included restrooms, showers and dressing rooms near the lake, two horse barns, an exhibition building, improved animal pens and shelters in the zoo and interior improvements to the existing caretaker's residence. Buildings still in existence on Tautphaus Park property from this time period include the caretaker's residence, the log hut used by bathers and one of the horse barns.

=== 1943 – present – Tautphaus Park ===
When the US entered World War II, activities at Tautphaus Park continued sporadically. In 1944, 500 German prisoners of war were housed at Tautphaus Park in the large log exhibition building. The prisoners were used as labor in the potato and sugar beet fields. In 1946 the prisoners were returned to their native country, however some of the prisoners found American sponsors and returned to Idaho Falls where they became US citizens.

Due to a series of drownings, the lake was drained in 1947. The former lake became the sunken softball diamond that can be seen at the park today.

== Idaho Falls Zoo at Tautphaus Park ==
The zoo at Tautphaus Park originated in 1934 when the City of Idaho Falls took ownership of the park. Al Heslop became resident superintendent of the park and director of the zoo in the early years when the zoo housed local wildlife including bears, elk, deer, antelope, badgers and coyotes, in addition to monkeys and birds.

Today the zoo sits on 7 acres within Tautphaus Park and houses over 300 individual animals representing 130 exotic species. Known as “the best little zoo in the west”, the Idaho Falls Zoo is operated by the City of Idaho Falls Parks and Recreation Department. The first zoo in Idaho to be accredited by the Association of Zoos and Aquariums, it currently participates in over 40 species survival plans. The zoo averages around 145,000 visitors during the season.

Tautphaus Park Zoological Society is a non-profit corporation dedicated to helping the City promote and expand the zoo. Fundraising events have included Wines in the Wild, Chillin’ at the Zoo, Zoo Brew, Hawaiian Masquerade Ball and Boo at the Zoo.

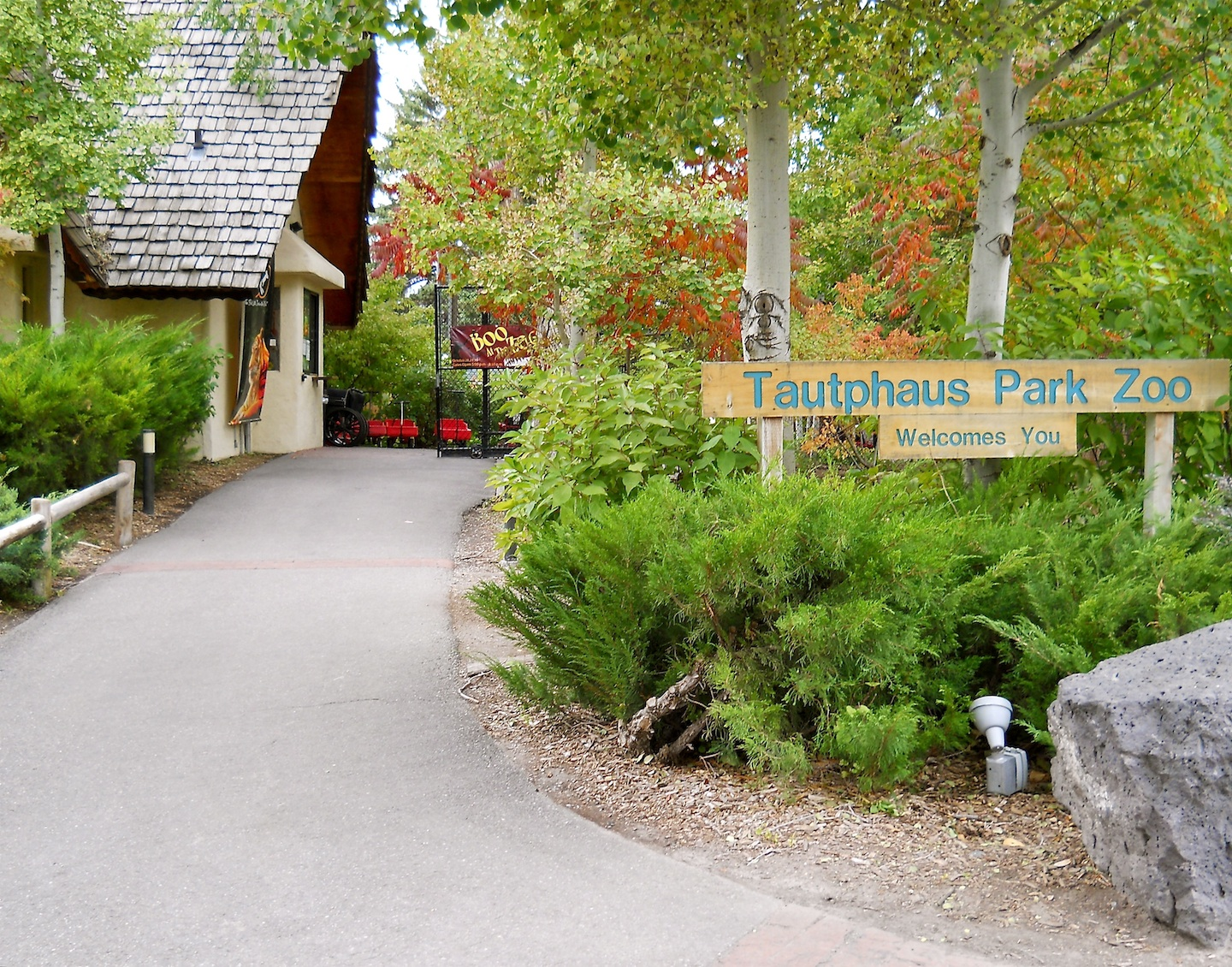
Zoo entrance.

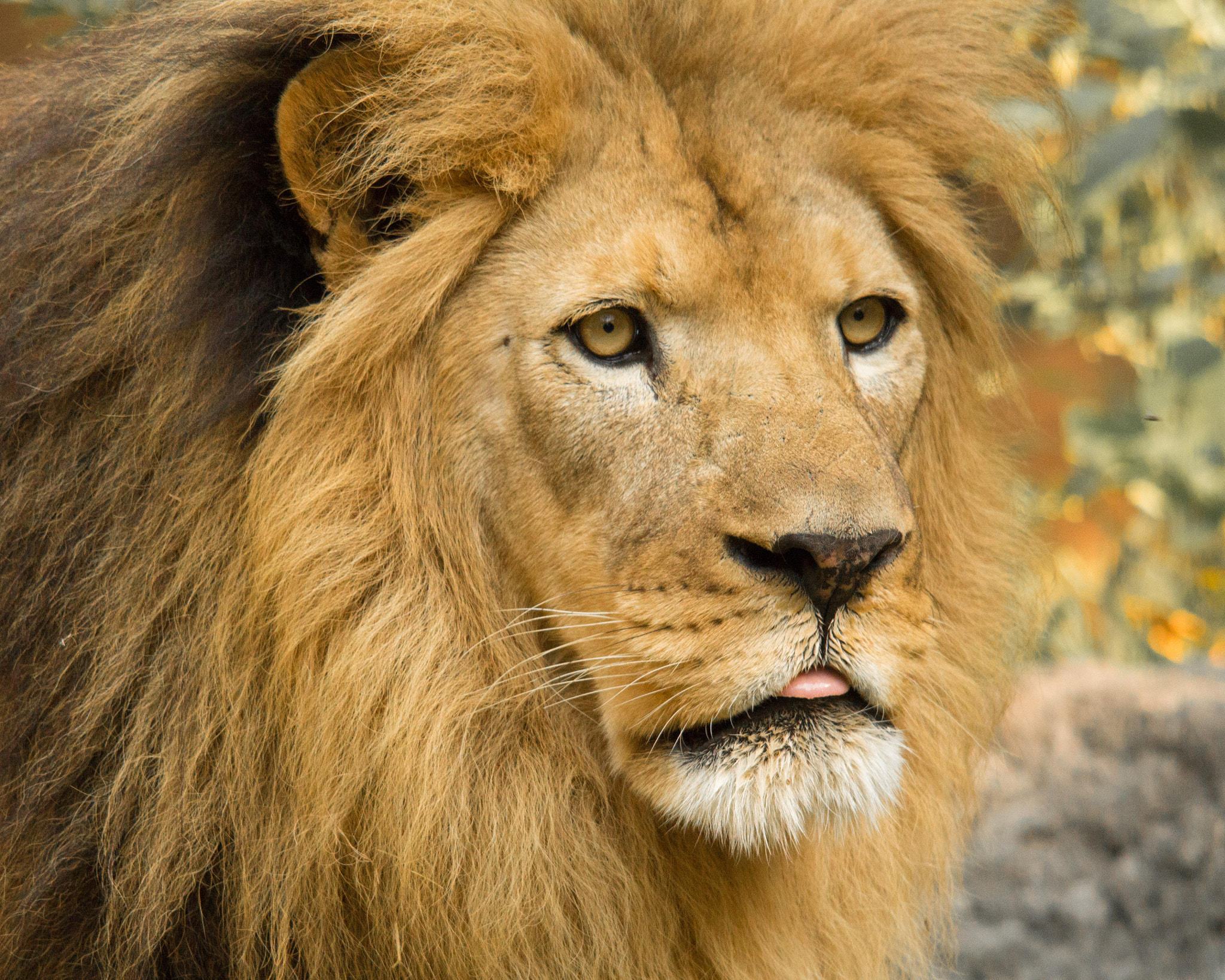
Lion.

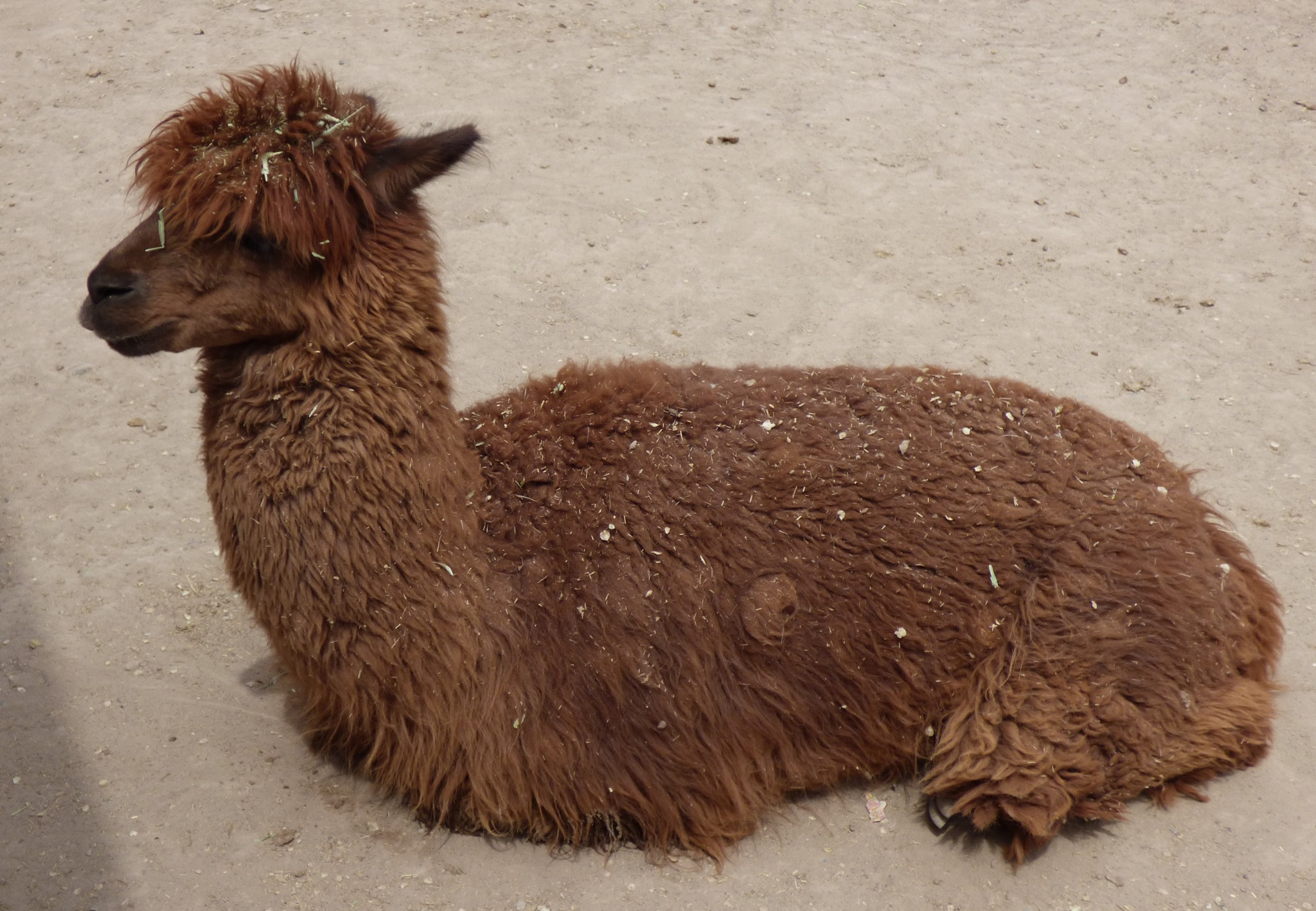
Alpaca.

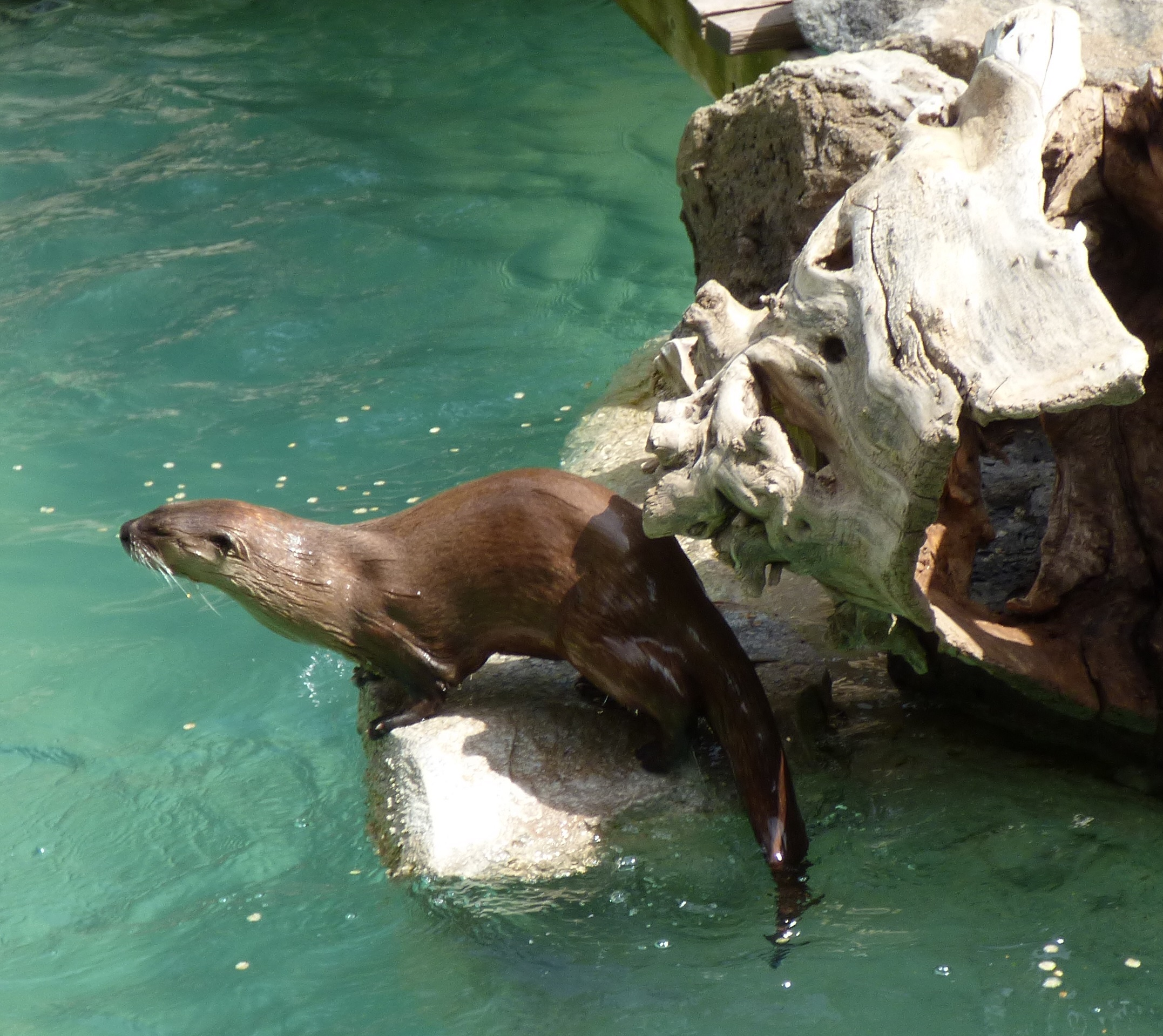
North American river otter.

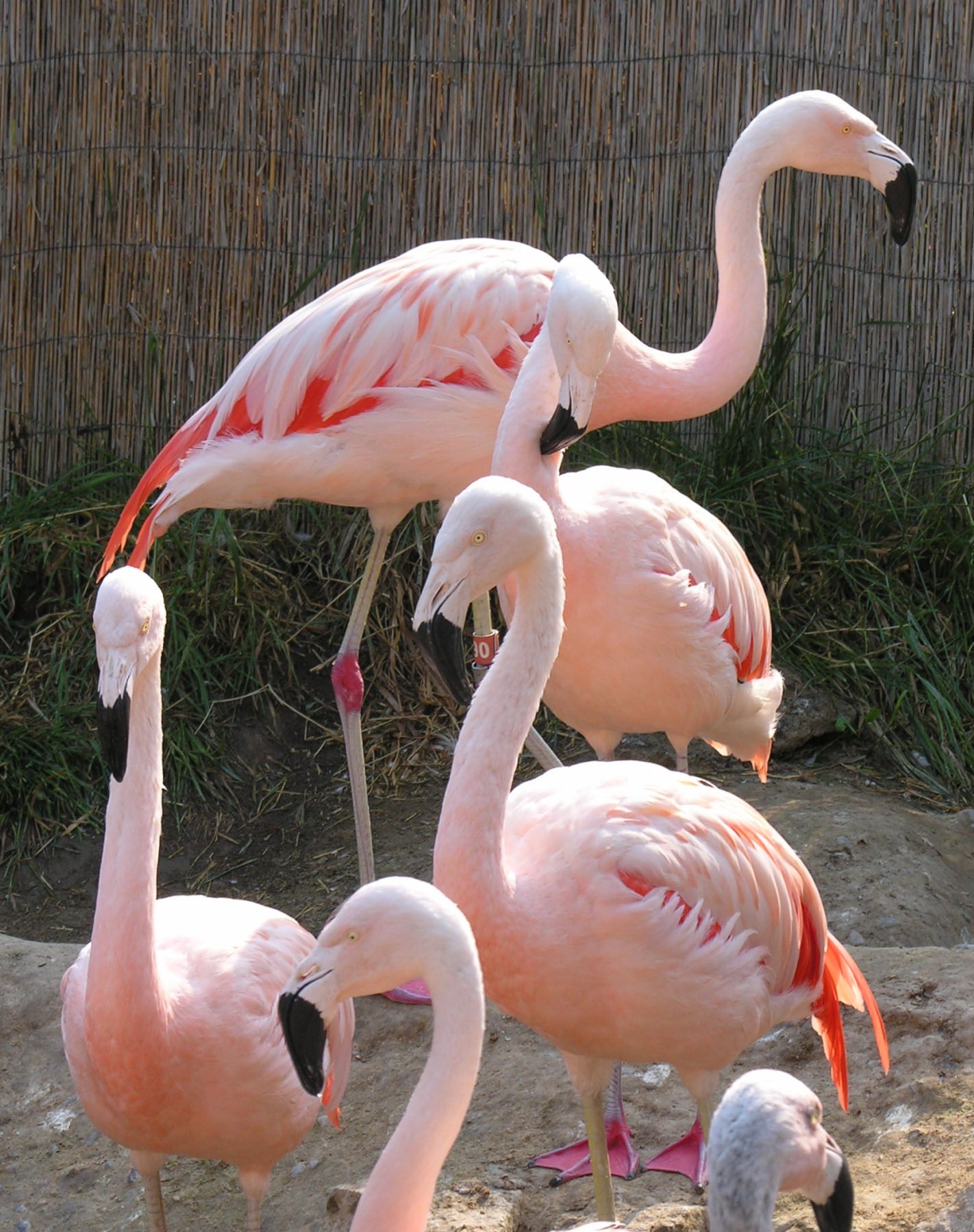
Flamingos.

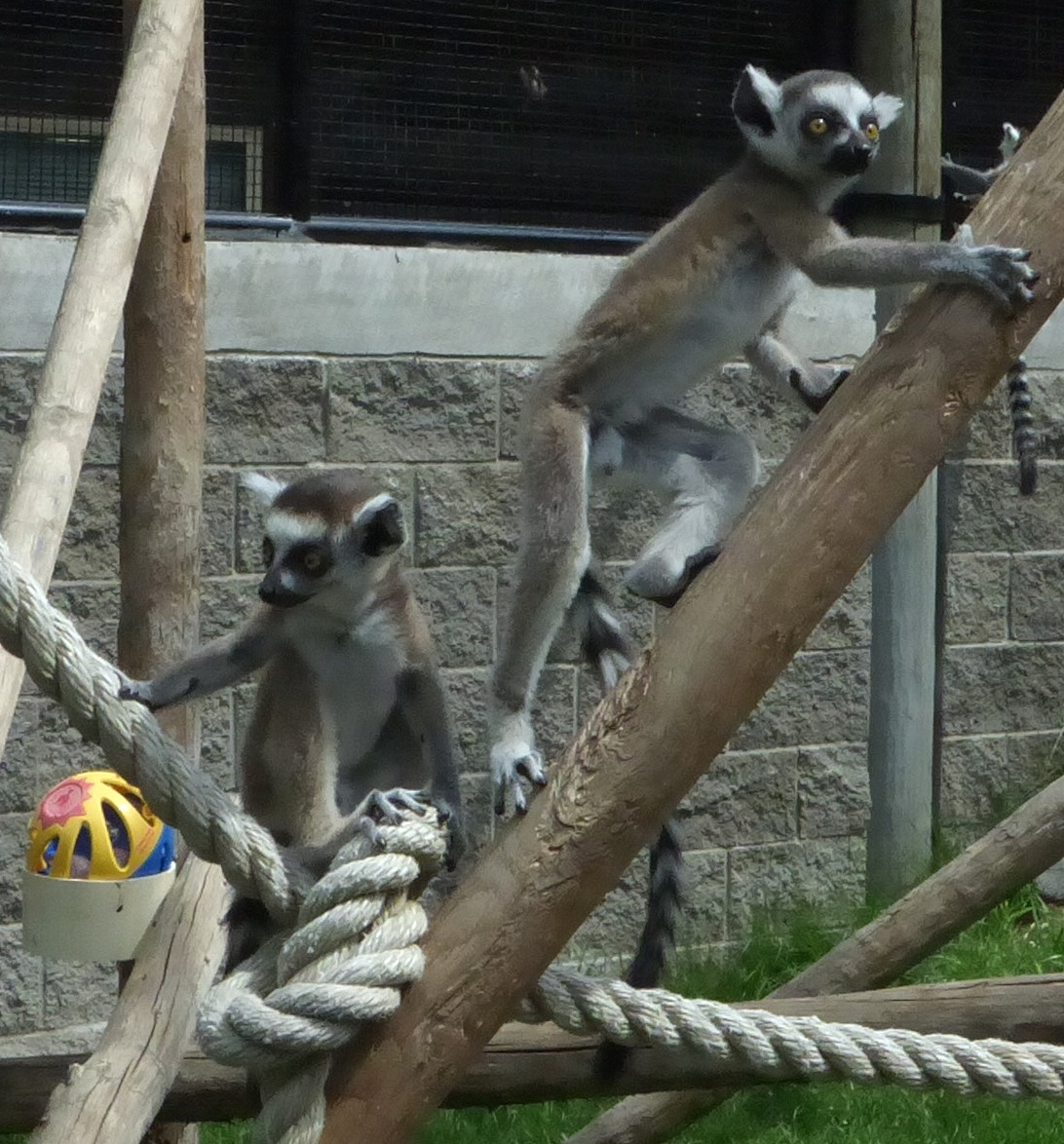
Baby ring-tailed lemurs.

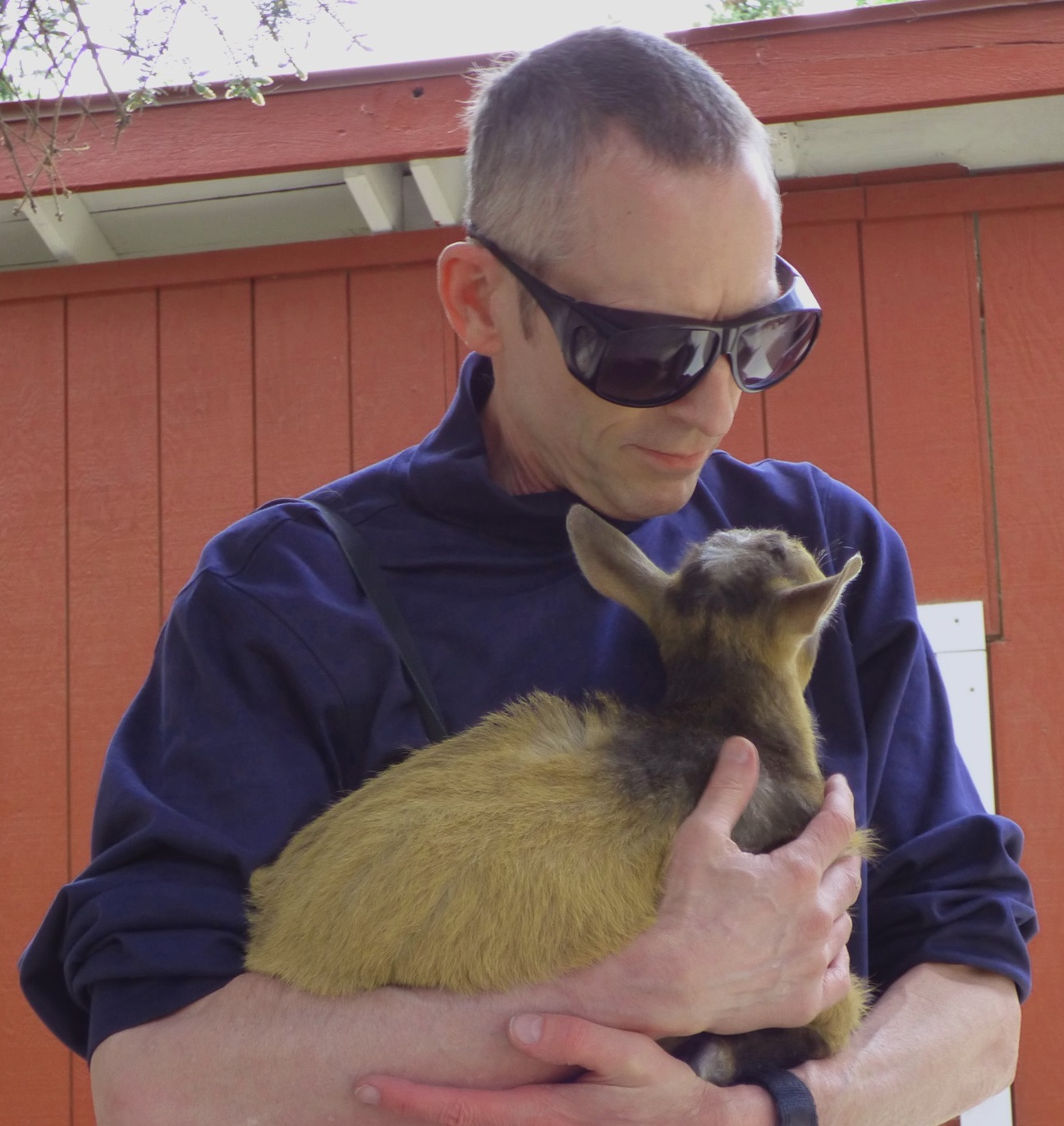
Visitor with a baby dwarf goat.

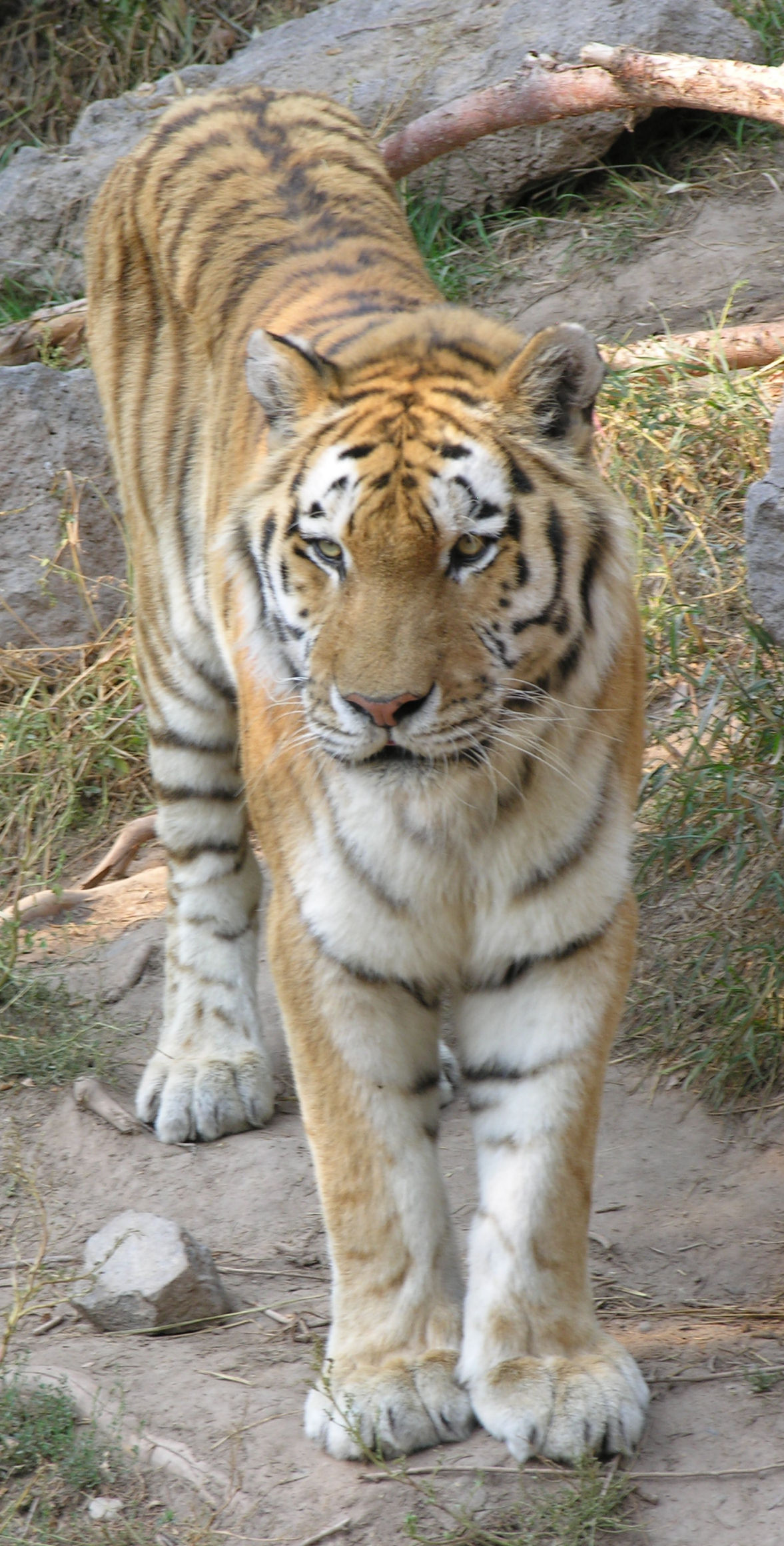
Tiger.

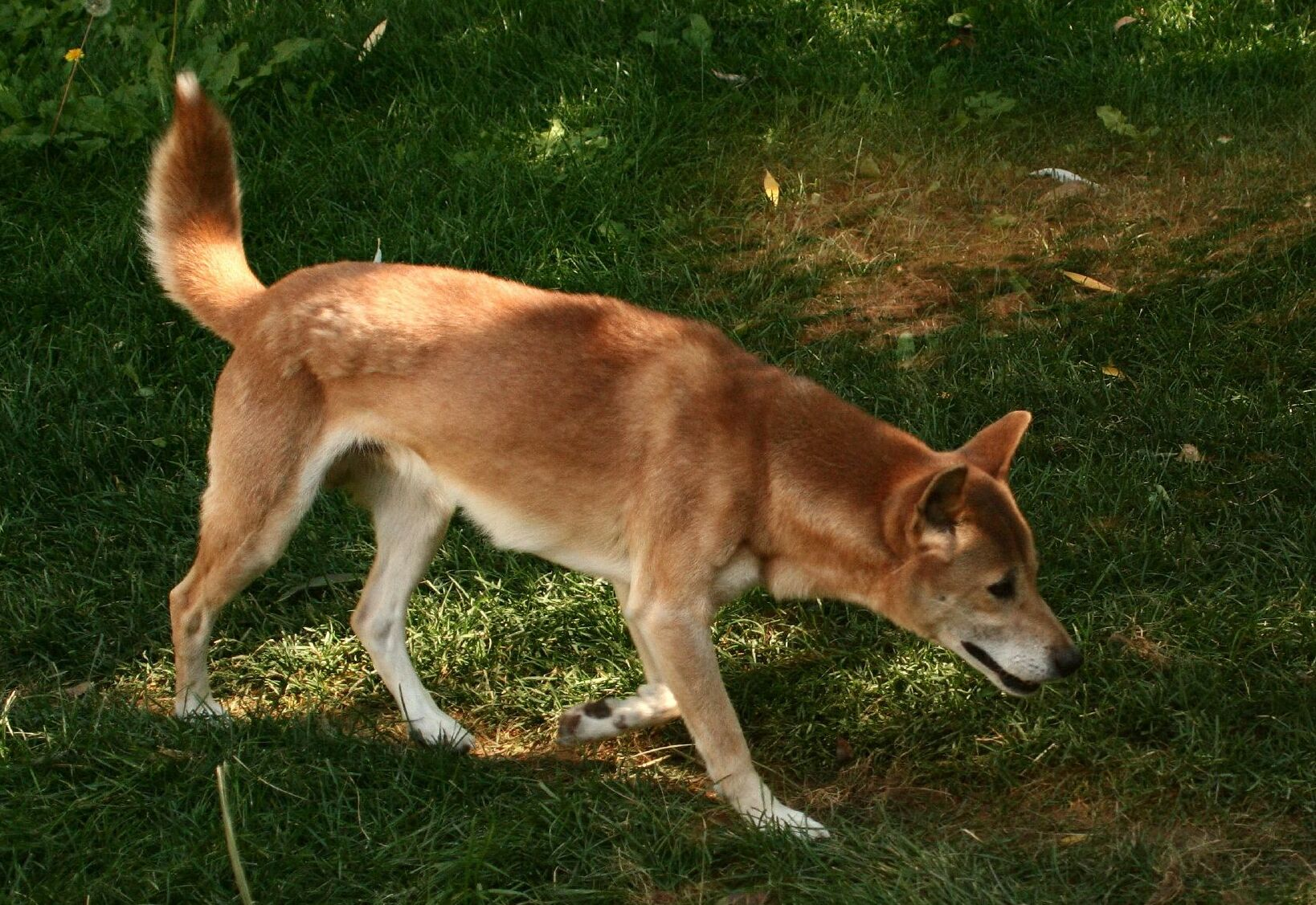
New Guinea Singing Dog.

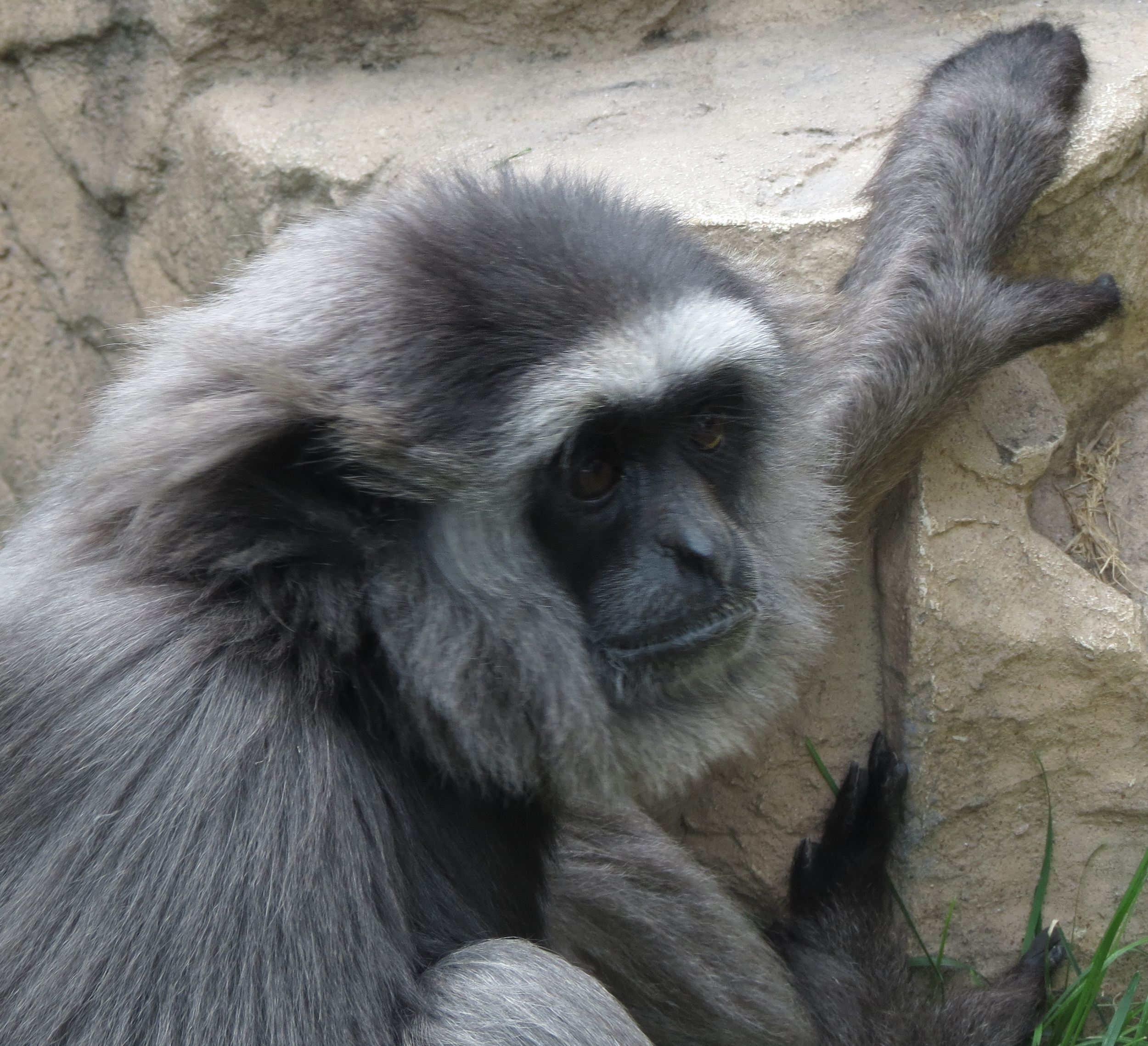
Grey gibbon.

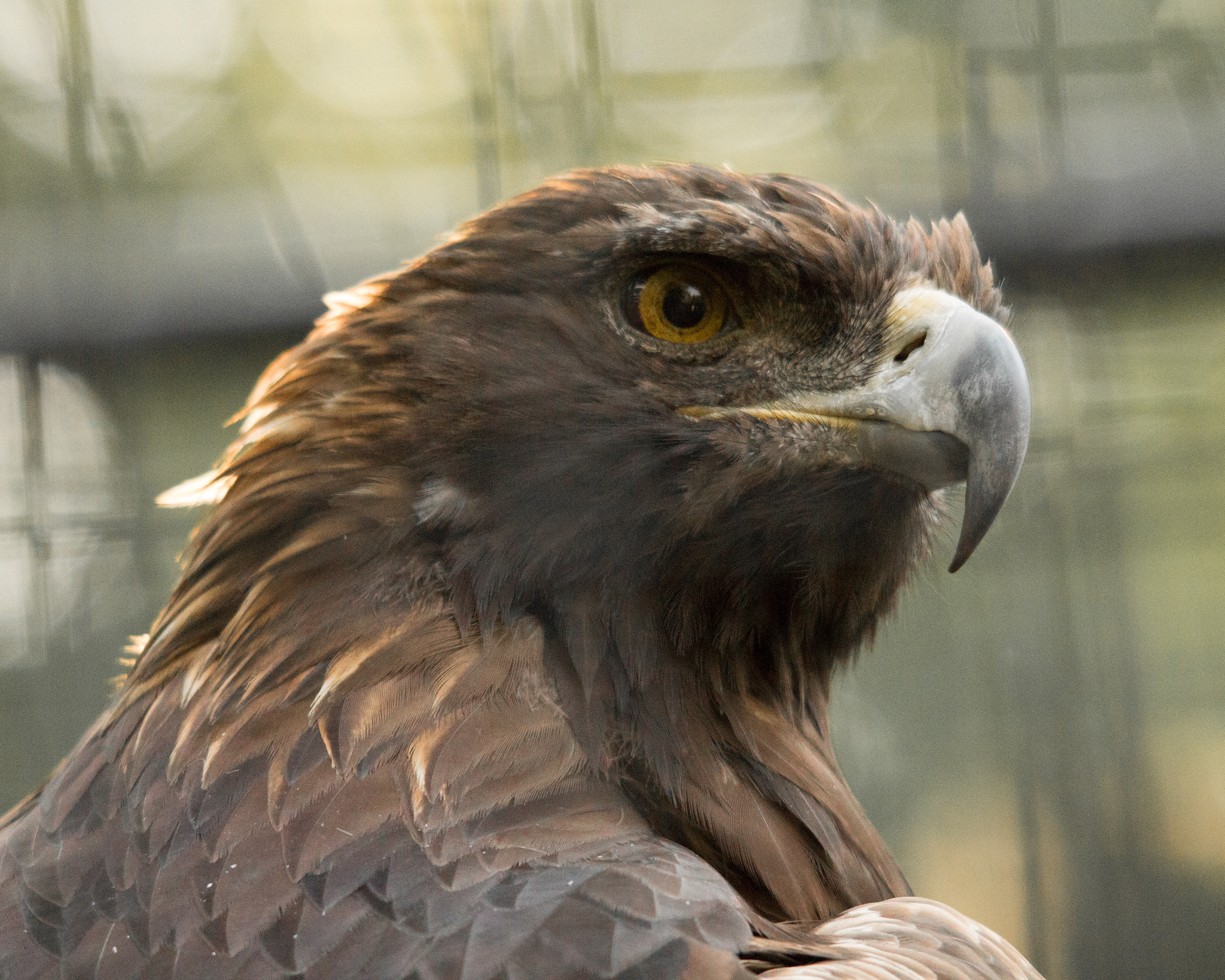
Golden eagle (Aquila chrysaetos).

== Funland at the Zoo ==
After the lake was abandoned in 1947, Funland was created by Western Amusement Company made up of Dr. G. B. Crabtree, Joe Gesas and Brad Minor who promised the city two fully operational carnival rides and a concession stand in the former dressing room that was used for lake swimming. Besides the original merry go round, Funland consisted of a ferris wheel, octopus ride, train ride and a swing ride with planes made out of salvaged supplemental fuel tanks from B-17 bombers. The ferris wheel stands out among the rides. Known as the Eli Wheel, it was designed by the Eli Bridge Company and installed in the late 1940s - early 1950s. Miniature golf was added later.

Funland was sold to Leo Larsen and his family who owned and operated it for more than 50 years. It nearly closed in 2000, but Ann Rehnberg bought and operated it until it was sold to the city in 2019. Funland was restored and re-opened in 2023.

== Marmo-Lehto Ice Rink ==
From the time Tautphaus Park became a reality in 1910, ice skating was a popular pastime on the lake until it was drained in 1947. It was not until about 1983 funds were acquired to build a new multipurpose building which would function as an indoor ice rink in the winter and an event center in the summer.

Named for local hockey legends, Joe Marmo (1925–2016) and Dr. Wayne K. Lehto (1933–2008), the Marmo-Lehto Ice Arena offers high quality hockey and ice skating programs in winter. The facility hosts hockey tournaments and figure skating competitions, as well as public skating. The first floor consists of an 85 foot by 190 foot ice surface, lobby, rental shop, snack bar and locker rooms. This facility is operated by the Idaho Falls Parks and Recreation Department.

== Future plans for Tautphaus Park ==
The Idaho Falls Parks and Recreation Department continues to seek improvements to all aspects of Tautphaus Park as population increases and facilities require updating. A master plan study from 2016 illustrates the goals for the future of Tautphaus Park which has seen some of the objectives completed over time as funding becomes available.
