= Costa Adeje =

Coastal tourist resort area of Santa Cruz de Tenerife Province in Spain

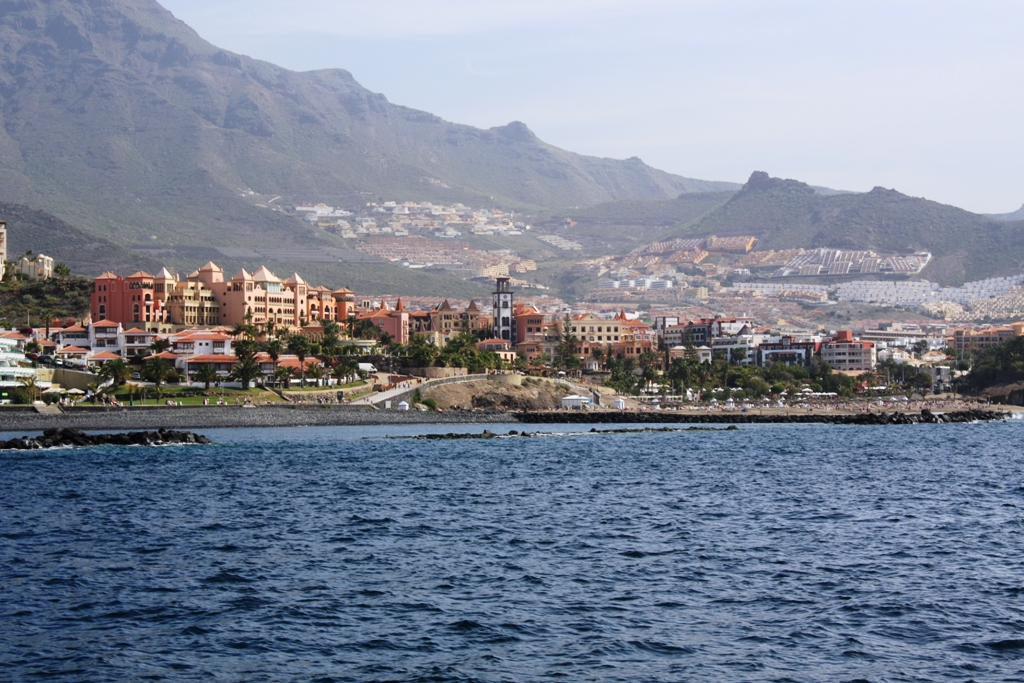
Costa Adeje

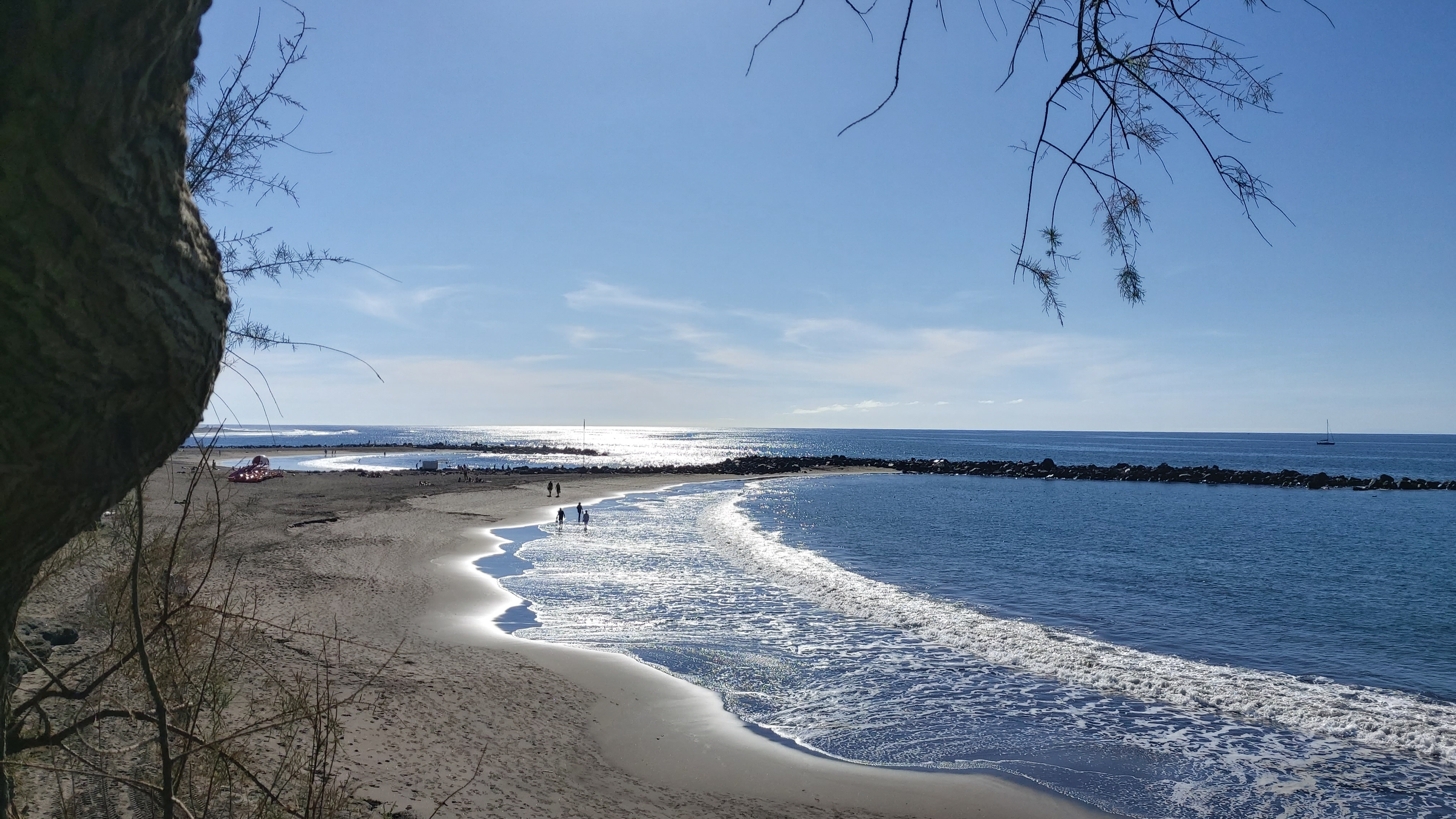
Beach "playa de Troya" in Costa Adeje

Costa Adeje is a coastal part of a town and municipality in the southwestern part of the island of Tenerife, one of the Canary Islands, and part of the province of Adeje, Santa Cruz de Tenerife, Spain.

== Sights ==
The Bahai del Duque was constructed in 1993. Casa del Duque was built by the Duke of Abrantes in 1930s and Casa Fuerte in 1556. Casa del Duque was occupied by Rafael Puig Lluvina who developed Costa Adeje in 1966.

== Attractions ==
Costa Adeje is a diverse holiday destination offering attractions such as exploring Teide volcano and Teide National Park, discovering authentic villages, and venturing to neighboring islands like La Gomera. Water enthusiasts can enjoy jet skiing, snorkeling, and boat trips, while whale and dolphin watching is a popular activity.

The area features renowned attractions like Siam Park and Aqualand, along with beautiful beaches such as Playa Fañabé and Playa del Duque. The mild climate and ample sunshine make Costa Adeje a year-round destination, and the nightlife scene includes venues like Papagayo Beach Club and Veronicas Strip.

Costa Adeje provides various accommodations, from luxury resorts to budget-friendly options, making it suitable for romantic getaways, family vacations, and more.

== Beaches ==
Adeje beaches include:

- Playa Fañabé
- Playa del Duque
- Playa de Torviscas
- Playa la Pinta
- Playa Ajabo
- Playa San Juan
- Playa de Troya
