= 2022 Spain Rally Superchampionship =

Motor rallying series

The Spain Rally Superchampionship (from spanish: Super Campeonato de Espana de Rally) is a rallying series run over the course of a year. The 2022 season is the 4th season of the series and is composed of 10 rounds in total. The season began on March 4 with Rally Tierras Altas de Lorca and is set to finish on December 16 with the non-point scoring round, Rallyshow Madrid.

== 2022 calendar ==
For season 2022, there will be 10 events - 3 on gravel and 7 on tarmac.

Round	Start date	Finish date	Event	Rally headquarters	Surface	Stages	Distance	Reference
1	4 March	5 March	(Spain) Rally Tierras Altas de Lorca	Lorca, Region of Murcia	Gravel	8	105,84 km	
2	1 April	2 April	(Spain) Rallye Sierra Morena	Province of Cordoba, Andalusia	Asphalt	12	177,42 km	
3	27 May	28 May	(Spain) Rally Ciudad de Pozoblanco	Pozoblanco, Andalusia	Gravel	8	100,90 km	
4	17 June	18 June	(Spain) Rallye de Ourense	Ourense, Galicia	Asphalt	11	145,96 km	
5	9 September	10 September	(Spain) Rally Princesa de Asturias	Oviedo, Asturias	Asphalt	TBA	TBA	
6	23 September	24 September	(Spain) Rally Villa de Llanes	Llanes, Asturias	Asphalt	TBA	TBA	
7	4 November	5 November	(Spain) Rally La Nucia-Mediterraneo	TBA	Asphalt	TBA	TBA	
8	25 November	26 November	(Spain) Rally Villa de Adeje	Adeje, Tenerife	Asphalt	TBA	TBA	
NC	23 September	24 September	(Spain) Rallyshow Madrid	Madrid, Community of Madrid	Asphalt	TBA	TBA	

Note: Rally Isla de Los Volcanes was set to take part on April 29–30. However, the rally was cancelled on April 28, despite the crews already being on the island.

== Entrants ==
=== Class 1 ===
Rally2/R5 entries
Car	Entrant / Car Running Team		Driver	Co-Driver	Tyre	Rounds
Škoda Fabia Rally2 evo	(Spain) Recalvi Team	(Spain) Recalvi Team	(Spain) Jose Antonio Suarez	(Spain) Alberto Iglesias	MI	1-6
Škoda Fabia Rally2 evo	(India) Team MRF Tyres	(Spain) Race Seven	(Spain) Efren Llarena	(Spain) Sara Fernandez	MR	1-6
Škoda Fabia Rally2 evo	(Spain) Osca Motor Club	(Spain) Calm Competicio	(Spain) Cristian Garcia Martinez	(Spain) Mario Gonzalez	MR	1-2
Škoda Fabia Rally2 evo	(Spain) Biela Club Manresa	(Spain) Calm Competicio	(Uruguay) Rodrigo Zeballos	(Spain) Sebastian Gonzalez	MI	1-3
Škoda Fabia Rally2 evo	(Spain) Abia Motorsport	(Spain) Juan Jose Abia	(Spain) Juan Jose Abia	(Spain) Pablo Sanchez	MI	2, 6
Škoda Fabia R5	(Spain) Escuderia Cobreces	(Spain) Jaime San Emeterio	(Spain) Alvaro Lobera Robles	(Spain) Vanessa Valle		4
Hyundai i20 N Rally2	(Spain) Hyundai Motor Espana	(Spain) Ivan Ares	(Spain) Ivan Ares	(Spain) David Vazquez	P	1-6
Hyundai i20 N Rally2	(Spain) Hyundai Motor Espana	(Spain) Teo Martin Motorsport	(Spain) Pepe López	(Spain) Borja Rozada	MI	1-6
Hyundai i20 N Rally2	(Spain) Hyundai Motor Espana	(Spain) Terratraining Motorsport	(Spain) Surhayen Pernia	(Spain) Alba Sanchez	MI	1-6
Hyundai i20 N Rally2	(Spain) Hyundai Motor Espana	(Spain) Terratraining Motorsport	(Spain) Francisco Antonio Lopez	(Spain) Borja Odriozola	MI	4, 6
Hyundai i20 R5	(Spain) Hyundai Motor Espana	(Spain) Terratraining Motorsport	(Spain) Francisco Antonio Lopez	(Spain) Borja Odriozola	MI	1
Hyundai i20 R5	(Spain) Escuderia Cobreces	(Spain) Terratraining Motorsport	(Spain) Xavier Agustina	(Spain) Nerea Campos	MI	4
Citroën C3 Rally2	(Spain) Citroën Rally Team	(Portugal) Sports&You	(Spain) Alejandro Cachon	(Spain) Angel Luis Vela	P	1-6
Citroën C3 Rally2	(Spain) Escuderia Cobreces	(Spain) ProRacing Competition	(Spain) Alvaro Lobera Robles	(Spain) Vanessa Valle	MI	2
Volkswagen Polo GTI R5	(Spain) Gamace MC Competicion	(Spain) AR Vidal Racing	(Spain) Marco Oriol Gomez	(Spain) Jose Murado	MI	3
Ford Fiesta Rally2	(Spain) Recalvi Team	(Spain) Oscar Palacio	(Spain) Oscar Palacio	(Spain) Jose Luis Sanchez	MI	5
Ford Fiesta R5	(Spain) Club Automovil Siero	(Spain) Oscar Palacio	(Spain) Jesus 'Tano' Fernandez	(Spain) Jose Manuel Garcia	MI	5
N5 Entries
Nissan Micra N5	(Spain) Gamace MC Competicion	(Spain) Gamace MC Competicion	(Spain) Marco Oriol Gomez	(Spain) Jose Murado	MI	1
Renault Clio N5	(Spain) A.C. Jerez	(Spain) A.C. Jerez	(Spain) Javier Galan Ibanez	(Spain) Marta Galan		3
Renault Clio N5	(Spain) Automovil Club de Lorca	(Spain) Automovil Club de Lorca	(Spain) Jose Carlos Mulero	(Spain) Carla Salvat	KU	1
Hyundai i20 N5	(Spain) Automovil Club de Lorca	(Spain) Automovil Club de Lorca	(Spain) Jose Carlos Mulero	(Spain) Carla Salvat	KU	3
Citroën DS3 N5	(Spain) Escuderia Local Sport	(Spain) Escuderia Local Sport	(Spain) Juan Pablo Garrido	(Spain) Sergio San Roman		2
Citroën DS3 N5	(Spain) RAC Vasco Navarro	(Spain) RAC Vasco Navarro	(Spain) Roland Holke	(Spain) Sara Radio	MI	6
VW Polo MK5 N5	(Spain) Alberto Ordonez	(Spain) Alberto Ordonez	(Spain) Alberto Ordonez	(Spain) Ignacio Garcia		5
Sources: Official rally entry lists:

== Results and standings ==
=== Season summary ===
Round	Event	Winning driver	Winning co-driver	Winning entrant	Winning time	Ref.
1	(Spain) Rally Tierras Altas de Lorca	(Spain) Efren Llarena	(Spain) Sara Fernandez	(India) Team MRF Tyres	49:02.0	
2	(Spain) Rallye Sierra Morena	(Spain) Pepe Lopez	(Spain) Borja Rozada	(Spain) Hyundai Motor Espana	1:47:54.8	
3	(Spain) Rally Ciudad de Pozoblanco	(Spain) Pepe Lopez	(Spain) Borja Rozada	(India) Team MRF Tyres	49:02.0	
4	(Spain) Rally de Ourense	(Spain) Efren Llarena	(Spain) Sara Fernandez	(Spain) Hyundai Motor Espana	1:25:52.8	
5	(Spain) Rally Princesa de Asturias	(Spain) Alejandro Cachon	(Spain) Angel Luis Vela	(Spain) Citroen Rally Team	1:33:03.7	
6	(Spain) Rally Villa de Llanes	(Spain) Alejandro Cachon	(Spain) Angel Luis Vela	(Spain) Citroen Rally Team	1:32:51.5	
7	(Spain) Rallye La Nucia-Mediterraneo				TBA	
8	(Spain) Rally Villa de Adeje				TBA	
NC	(Spain) Rallyshow Madrid				TBA	

=== Point scoring system ===
Points are awarded to the top 20 crews each rally.

Position	1st	2nd	3rd	4th	5th	6th	7th	8th	9th	10th	11th	12th	13th	14th	15th	16th	17th	18th	19th	20th
Points	35	30	27	25	23	21	19	17	15	13	11	9	8	7	6	5	4	3	2	1

Each round has a special stage called TC+ (can be selected by the rally organizers, otherwise it's the last stage).

Position	1st	2nd	3rd
Points	3	2	1

=== Results ===
Pepe Lopez is the current championship leader.
