= Barranco del Infierno (Tenerife) =

Ravine in Tenerife, Spain

Coordinates: 28°08′00″N 16°42′42″W

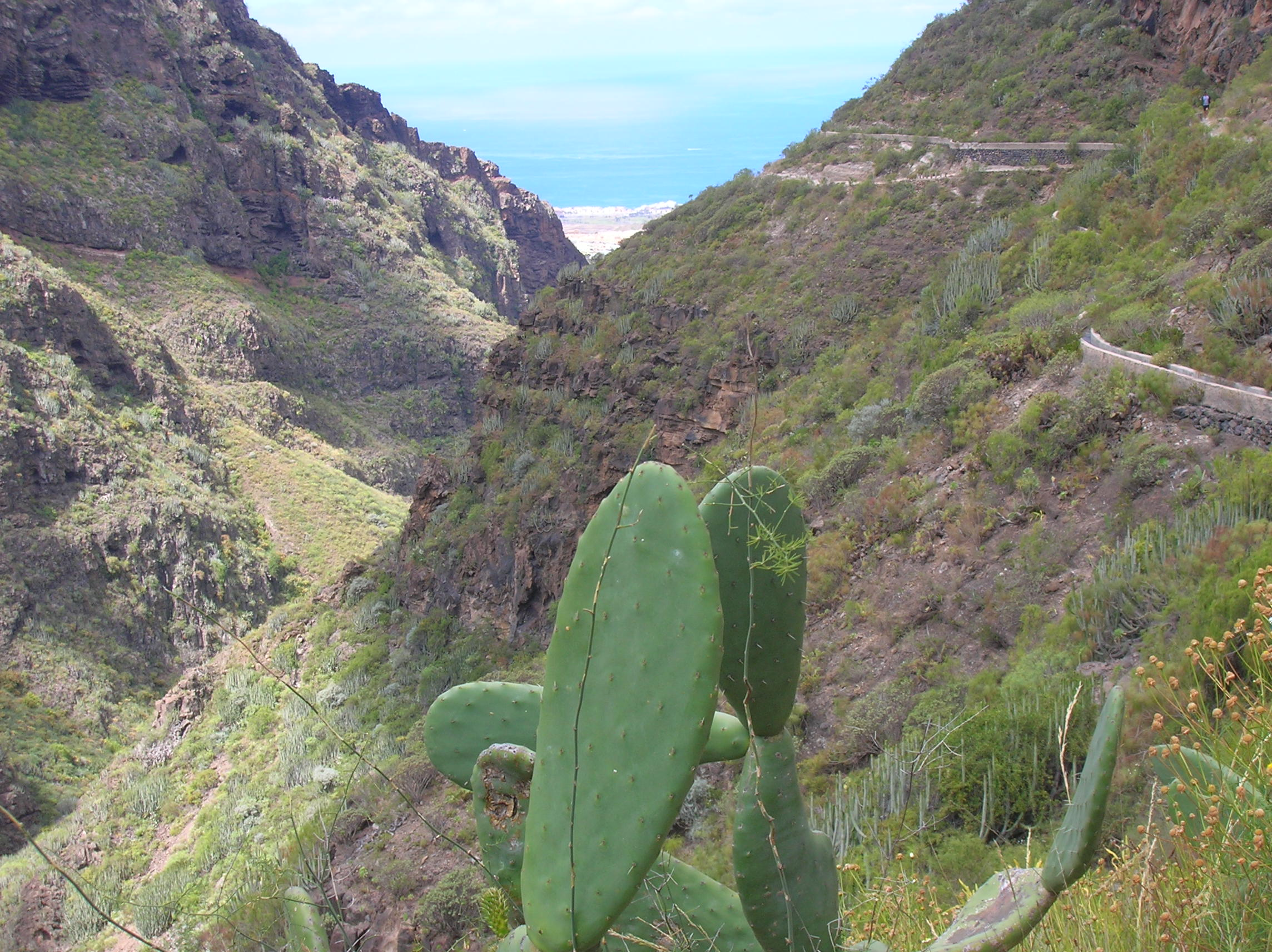
Barranco del Infierno

The Barranco del Infierno (in English: "Hell's Gorge") is a ravine located in the town of Adeje in the south of the island of Tenerife, Canary Islands, Spain.

It is the second most-visited protected area on the island. A popular hiking trail leads through the ravine to the highest waterfall on Tenerife. Access to the gorge is controlled by a limitation of 300 daily visitors. It is not permitted to under-5s, and under-18s must be accompanied by an adult. Reservations can be done online. The trail was closed for security reasons after a deadly accident in 2009 and again on October 26 2015, but was reopened on February 10 2016. The biggest change of all is the compulsory wearing of crash helmets. Currently it is open all the way to the end, except on rainy and windy days, additional safety measures have been implemented. The path takes approximately three and a half hours, between the outward and return journey, and the total route is approximately 6.5 km.

The area is very important archaeologically, since there are hundreds of caves that were home to many aboriginal Guanches, as well as caves with engravings. The largest collection of Guanche mummies and utensils were found here and placed in the Museum of Nature and Man of Santa Cruz de Tenerife.

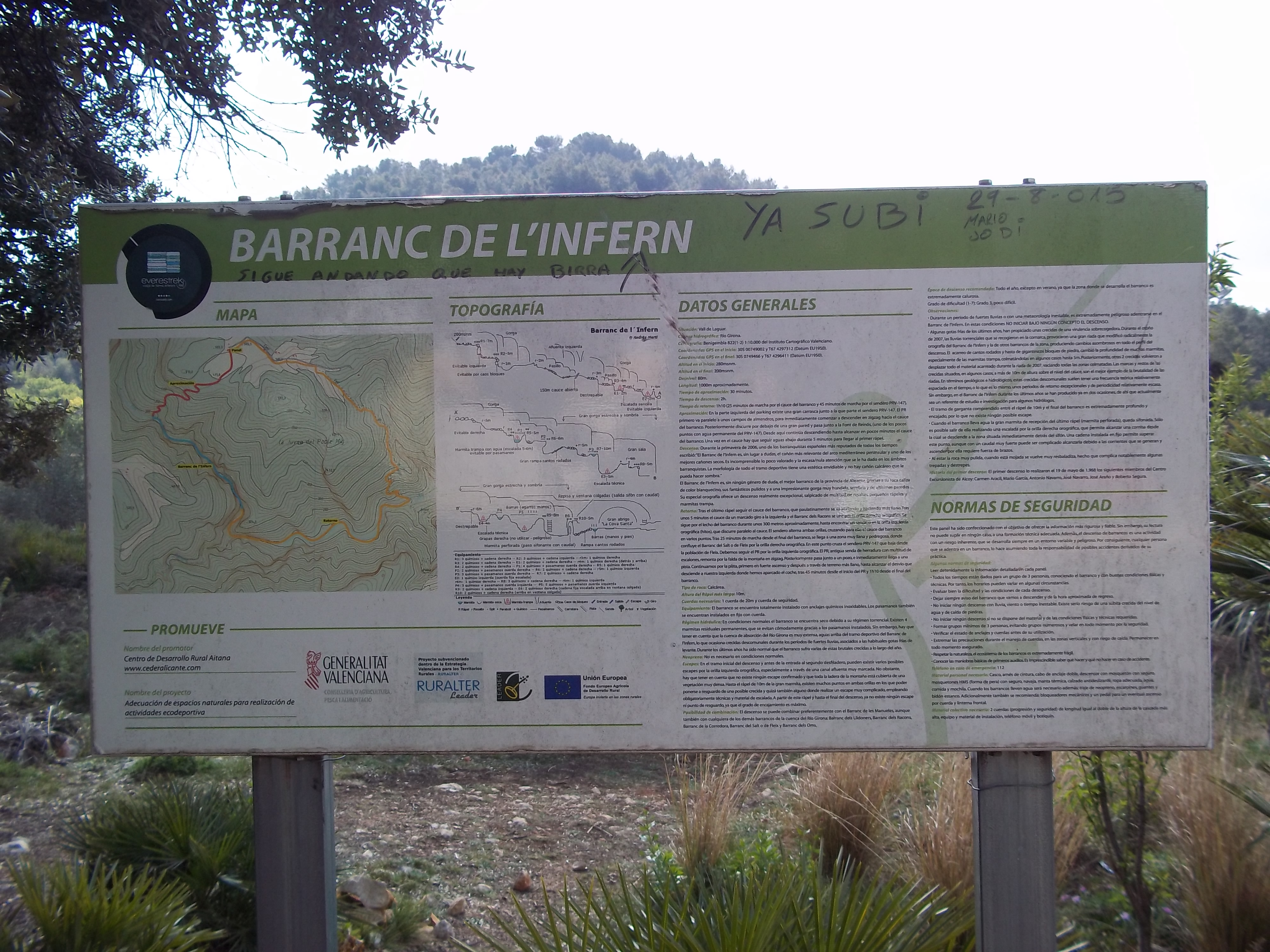
Information board in Spanish

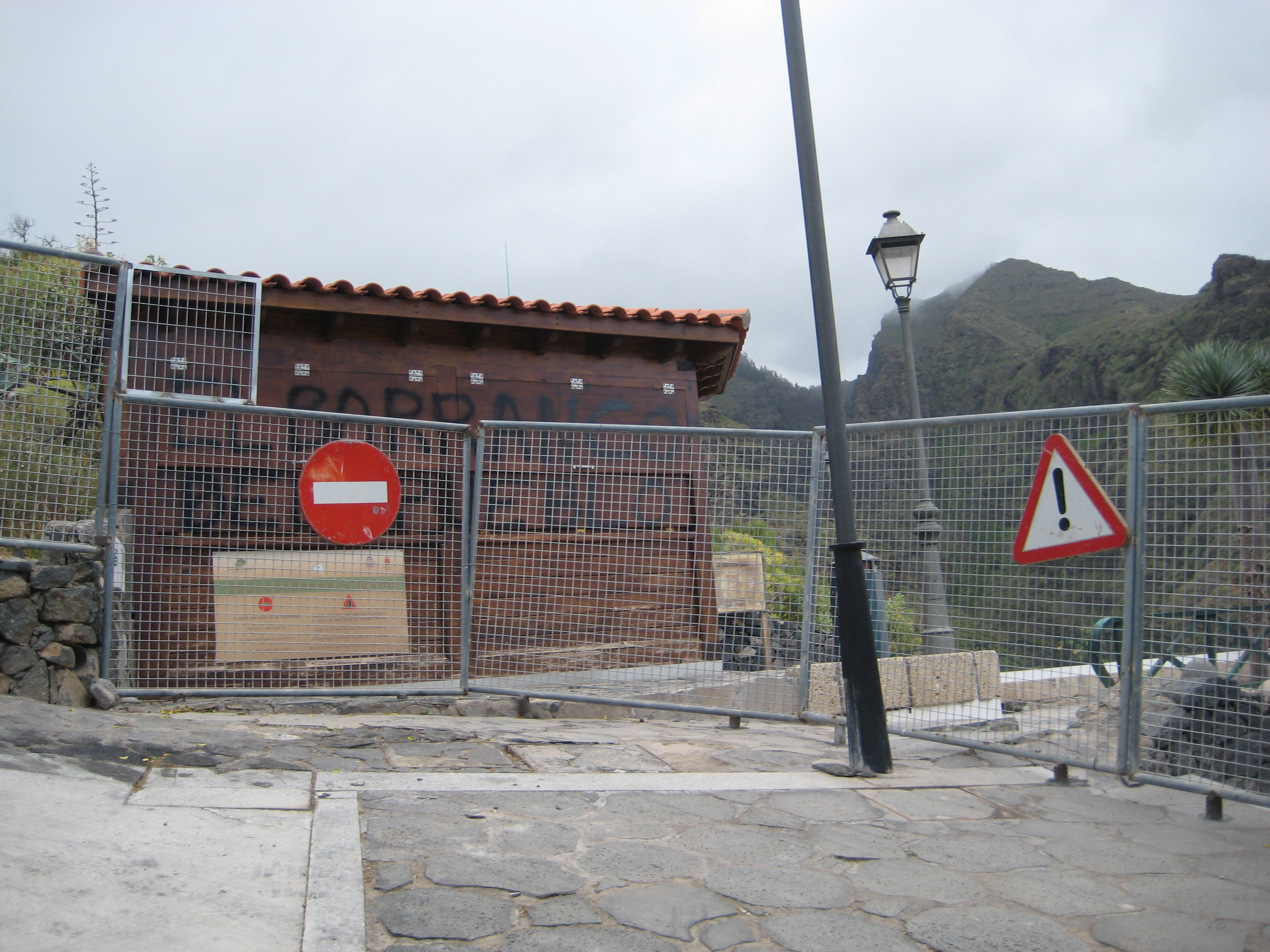
Fence at the entrance to the trail after the accident in 2009

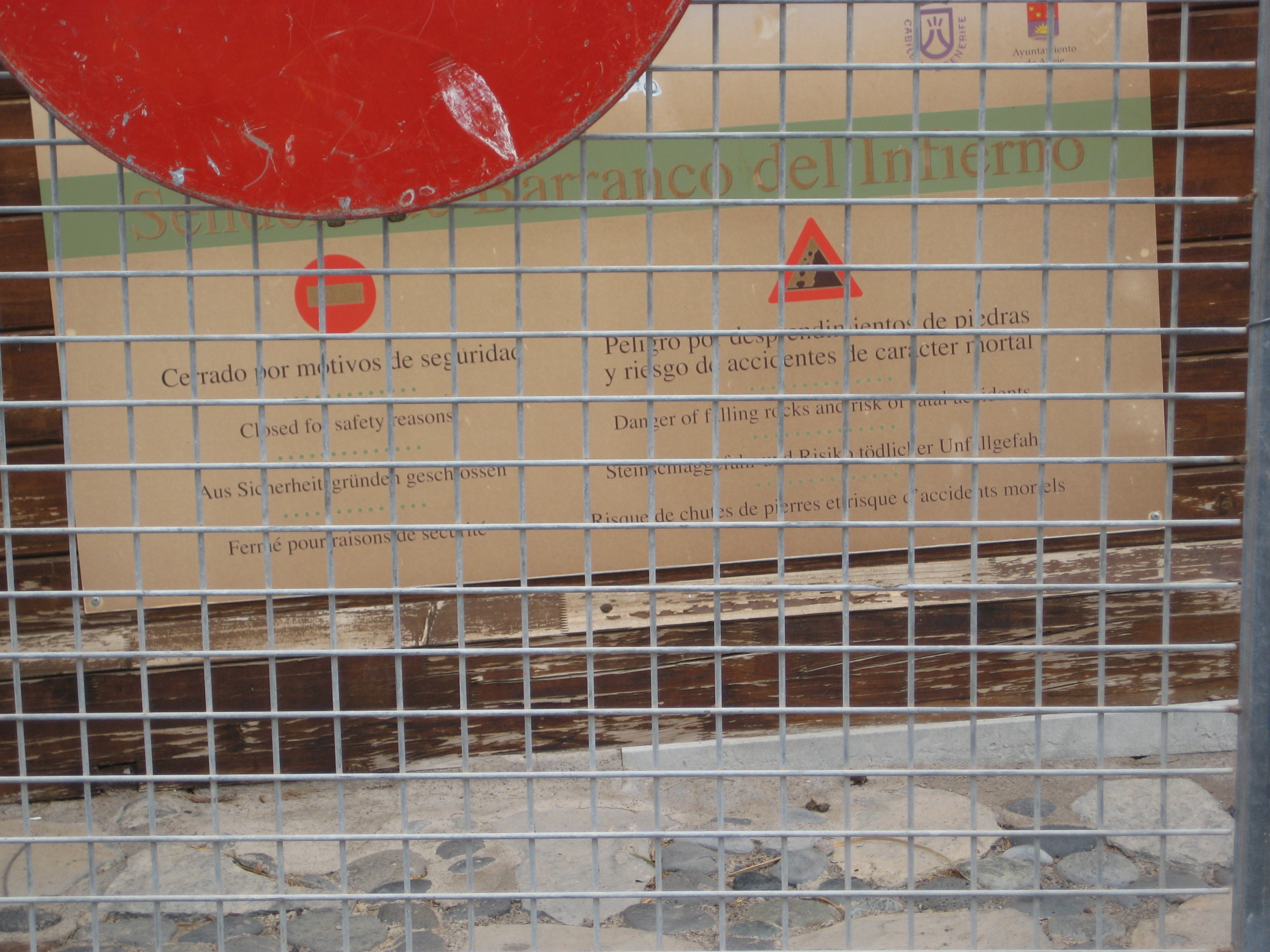
Detail of the sign

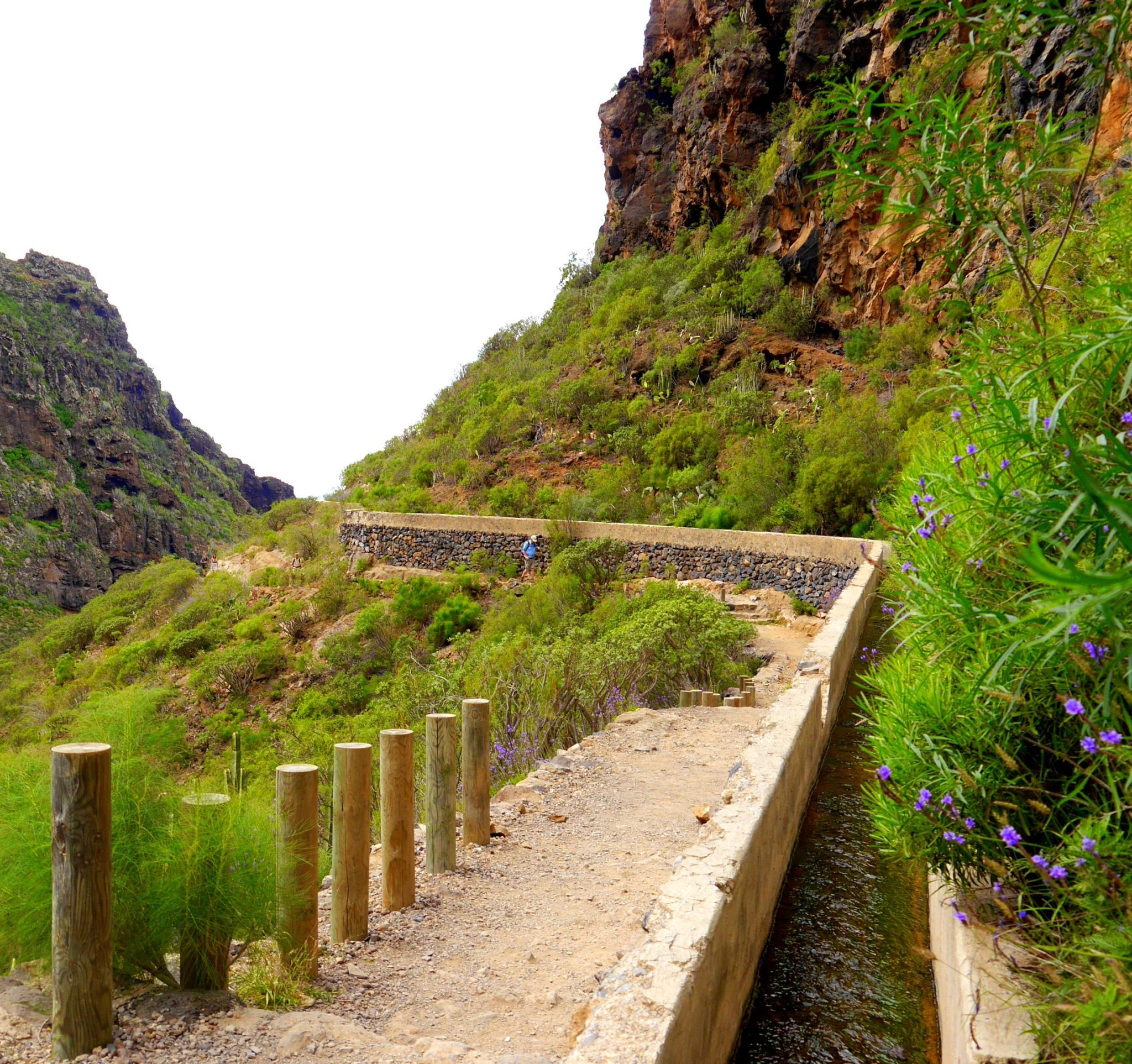
Trail - first part

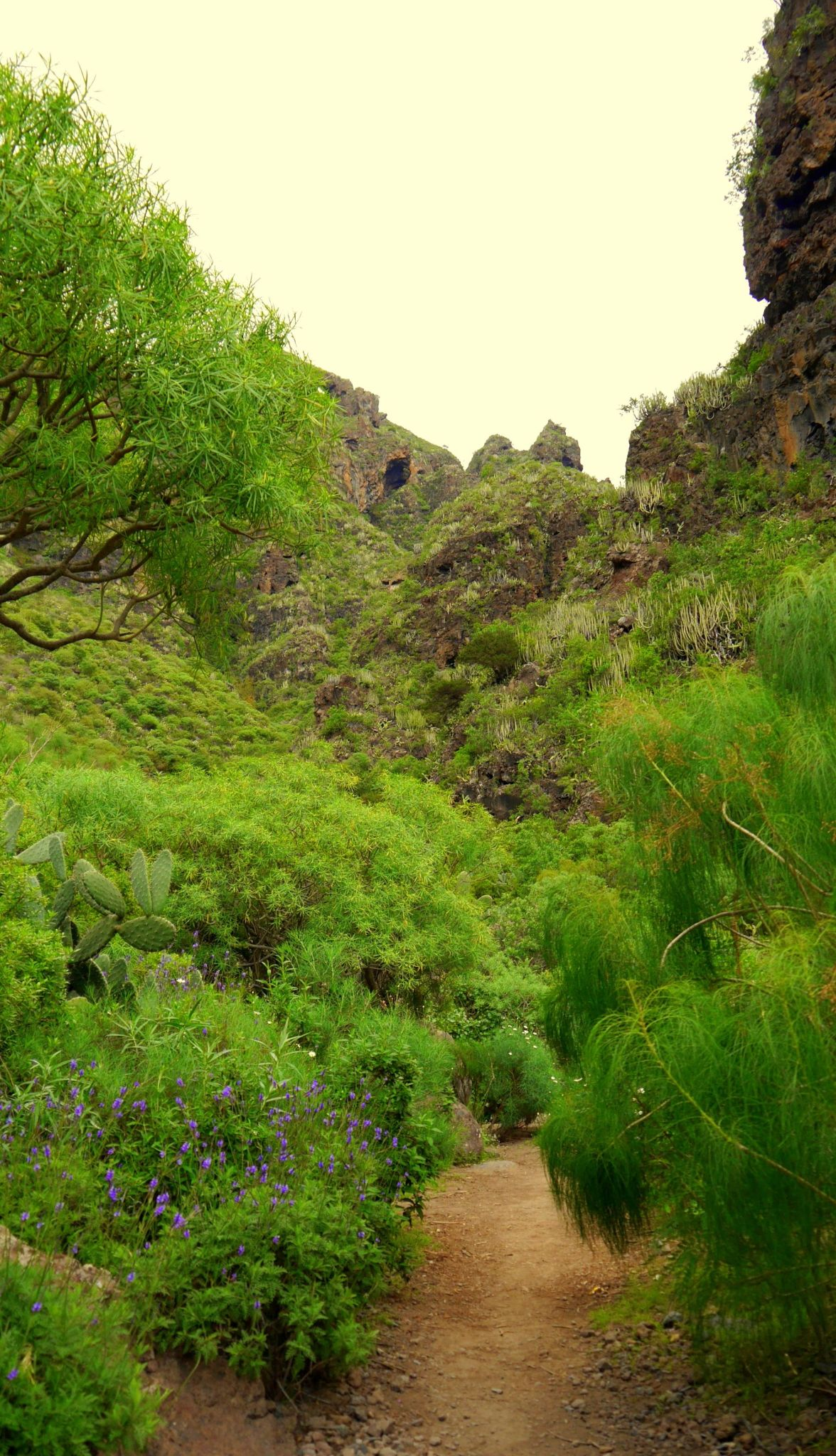
Trail - second part

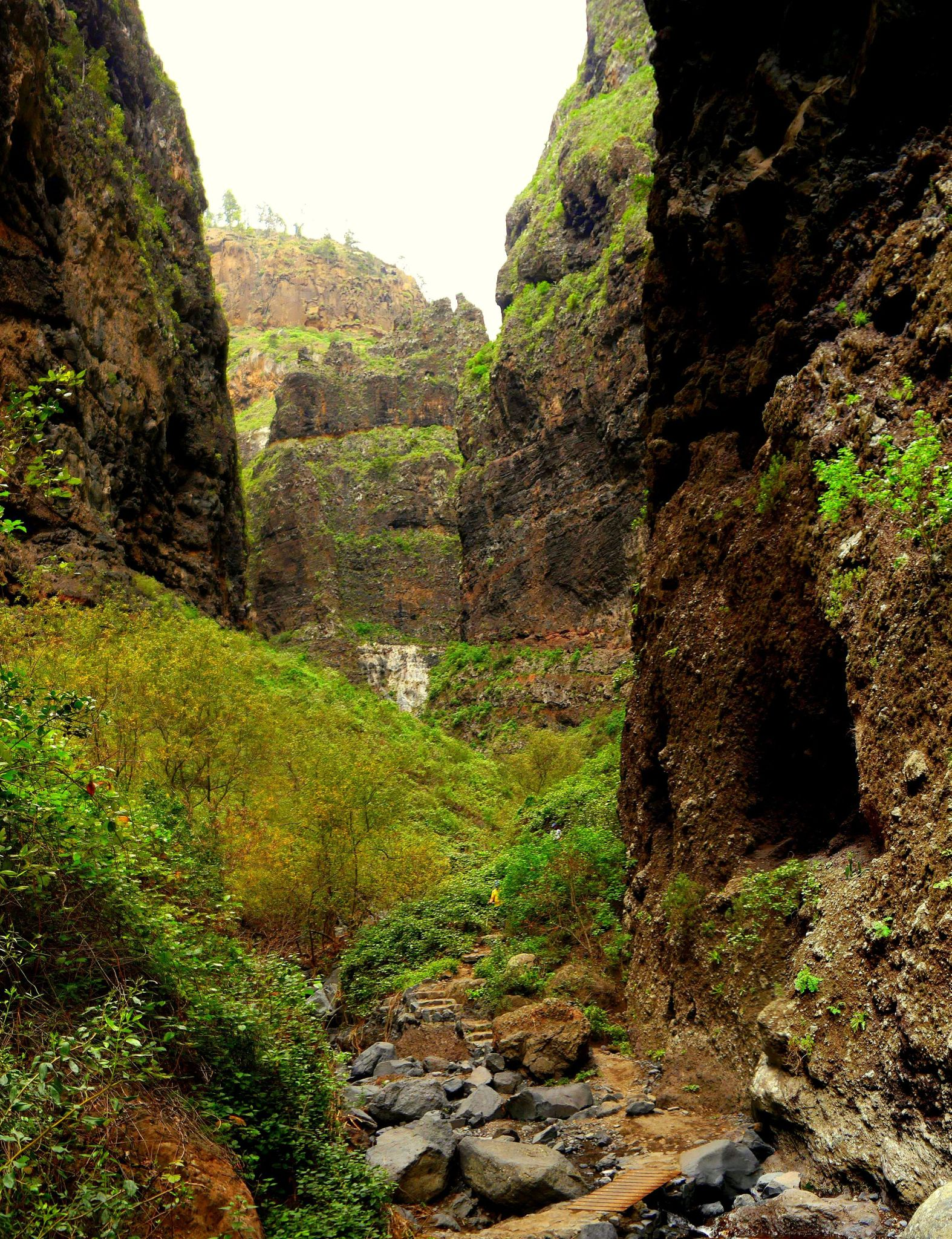
Trail - third part

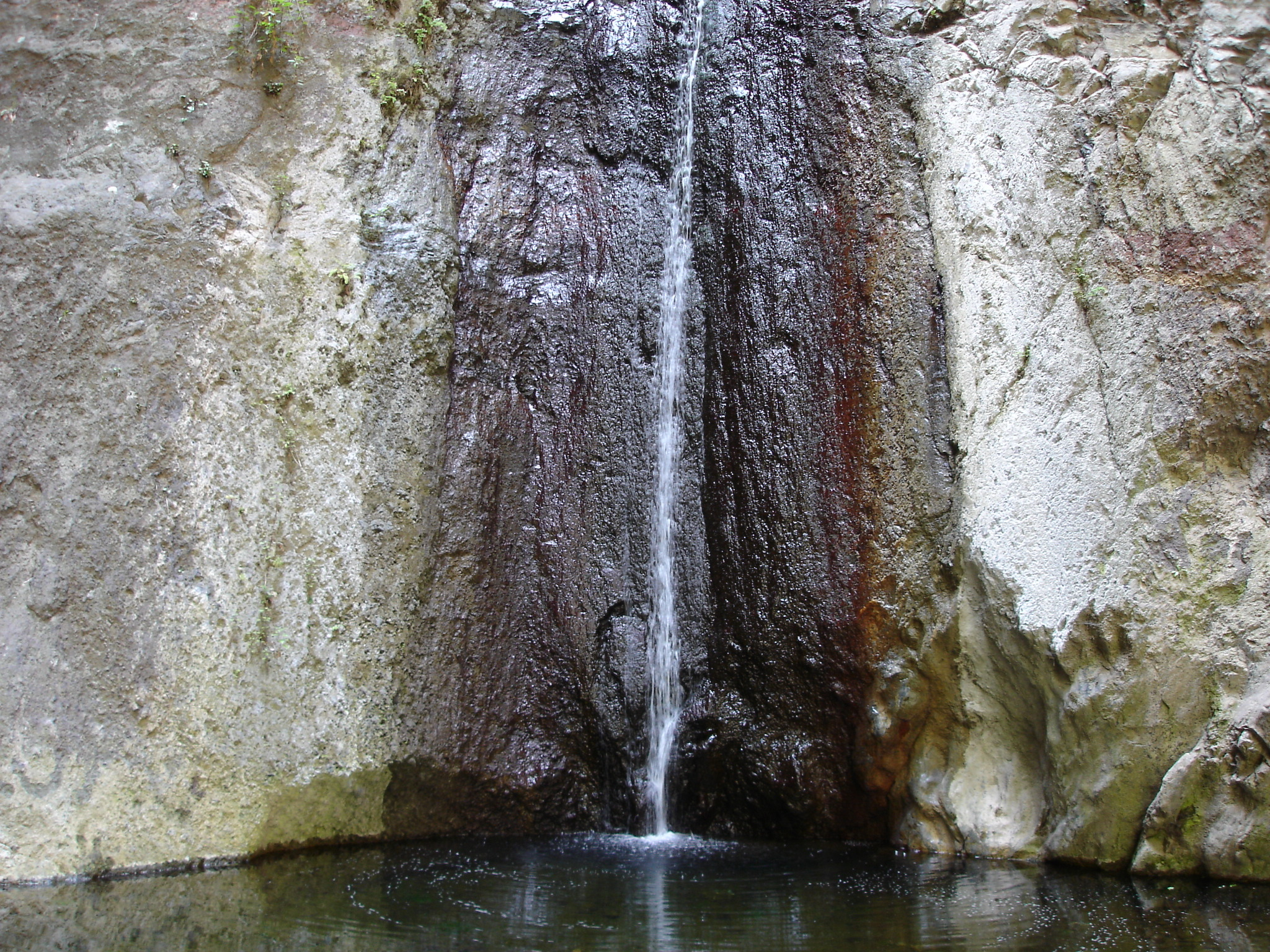
End of the trail
