= Siam Park (Tenerife) =

Water park in Tenerife, Canary Islands, Spain

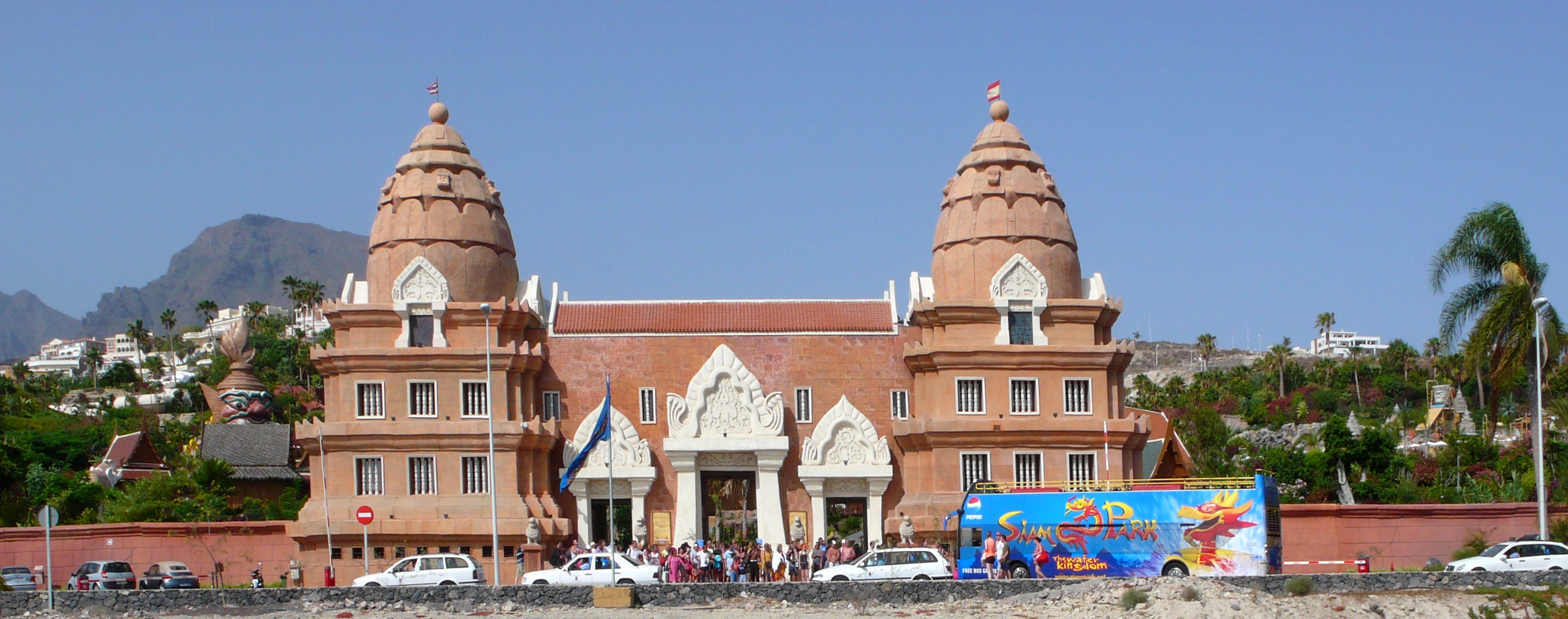
- Interactive map of Siam Park
- Location: Costa Adeje, Tenerife, Spain
- Coordinates: 28.0724°N 16.7257°W
- Owner: Loro Parque
- Opened: May 2007
- Visitors per annum: 1.2 million (2017)
- Area: 18.5 hectares (46 acres)
- Website: siampark.net

Siam Park is a water park in Costa Adeje, a coastal suburb in Tenerife, Canary Islands. Siam Park features a Siamese (Thai) theme. The park was opened by the Princess of Thailand Maha Chakri Sirindhorn. The principal owner is Loro Parque, operated by Wolfgang Kiessling and his son Christoph. A second park is planned for the neighbouring island of Gran Canaria.

== History ==
Siam Park's construction started in 2004 and cost 52 million euros (US$58.7 million). Originally stated to open in May 2007, the park endured construction problems and finally opened to the public on September 15 2008. The park's plans originally included a roller coaster, but the park opted to focus on developing the first phase of the park.

Siam Park includes Thai theming on all of its rides, park buildings, and restaurants. The park's 25 buildings are the largest collection of Thai-themed buildings outside Thailand. The park's designer, Christoph Kiessling, received permission from the Thai royal family to use the park's name and theme; but, to respect the family's wishes, he did not copy royal palaces, temples, or statues of Buddha in the park.

=== Gallery ===
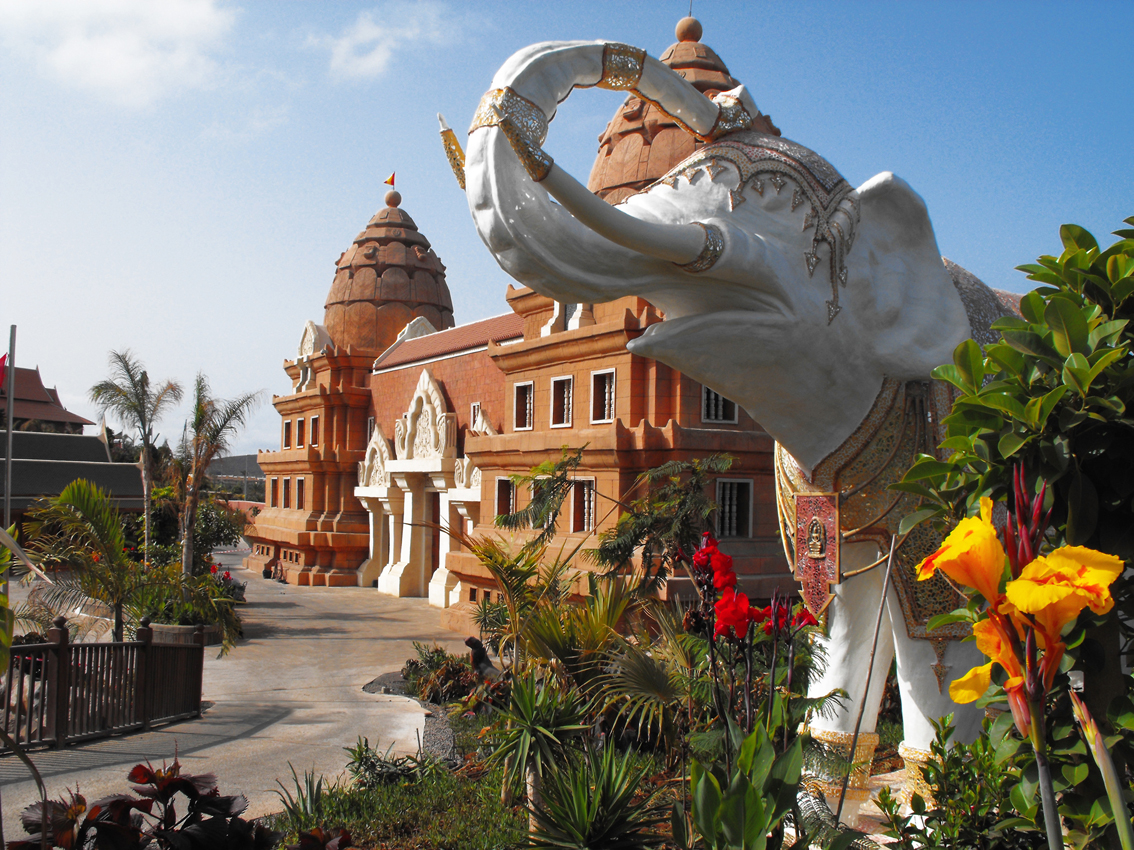
Elephant statue

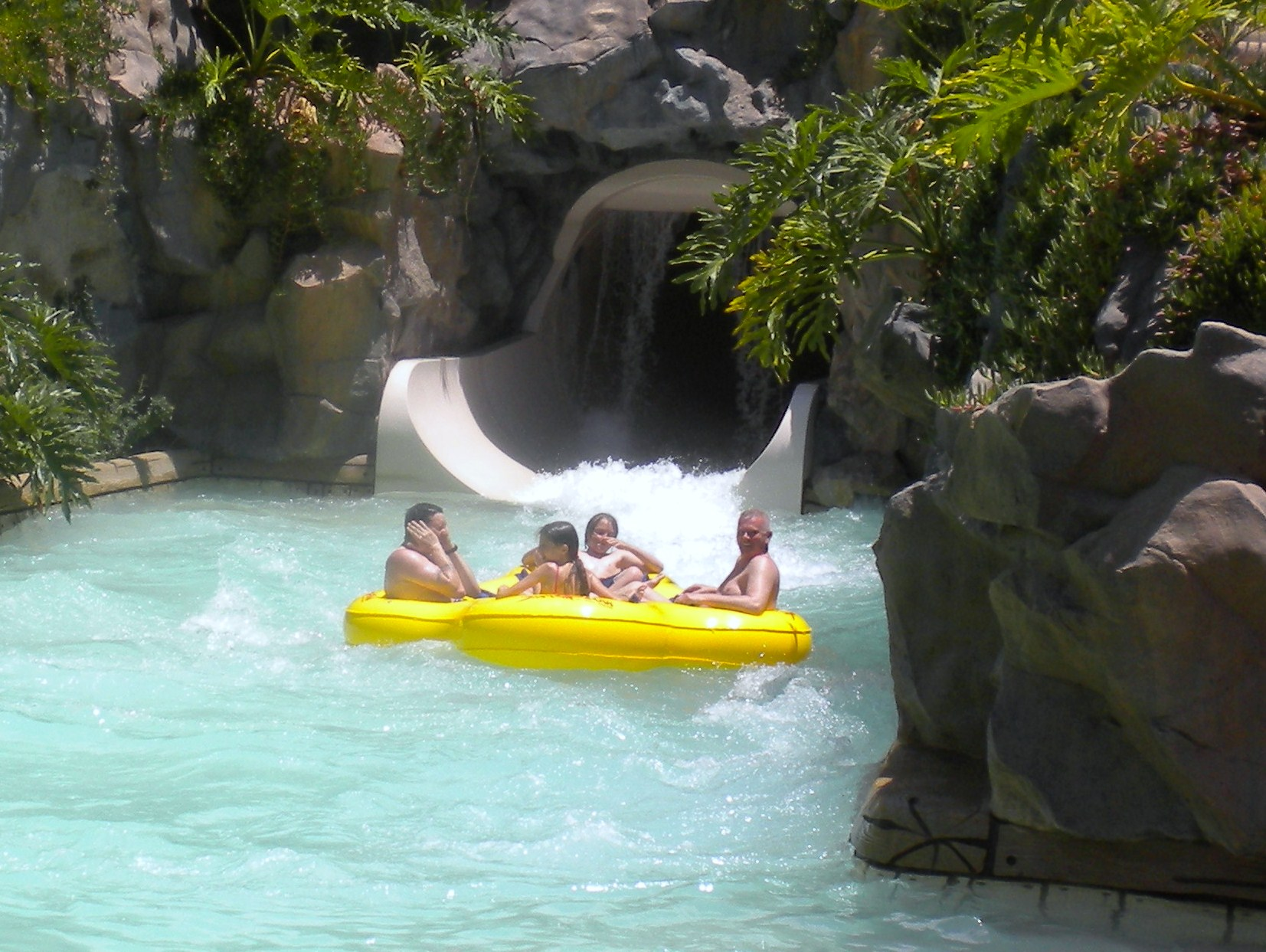
Raft

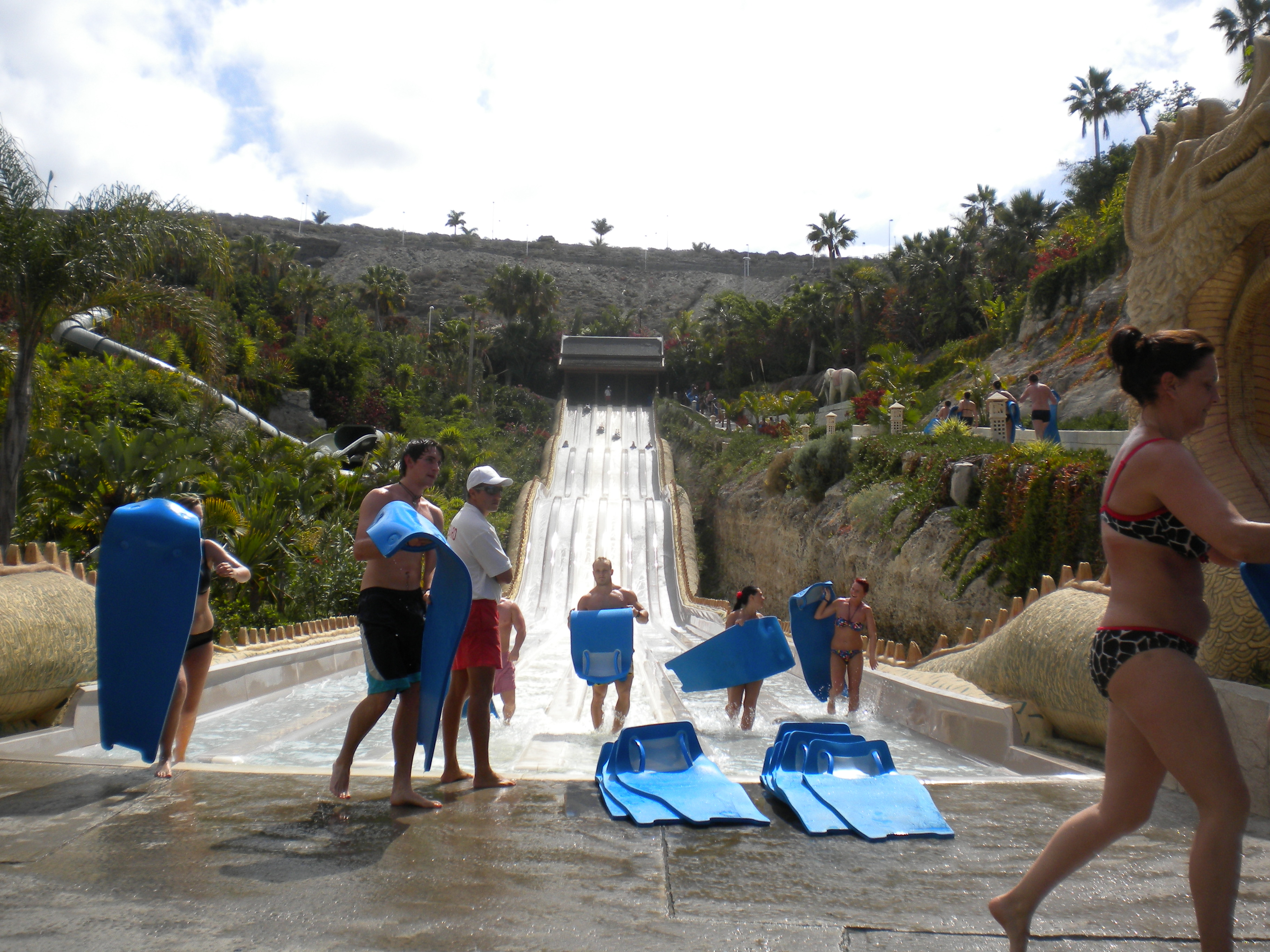
Water slide

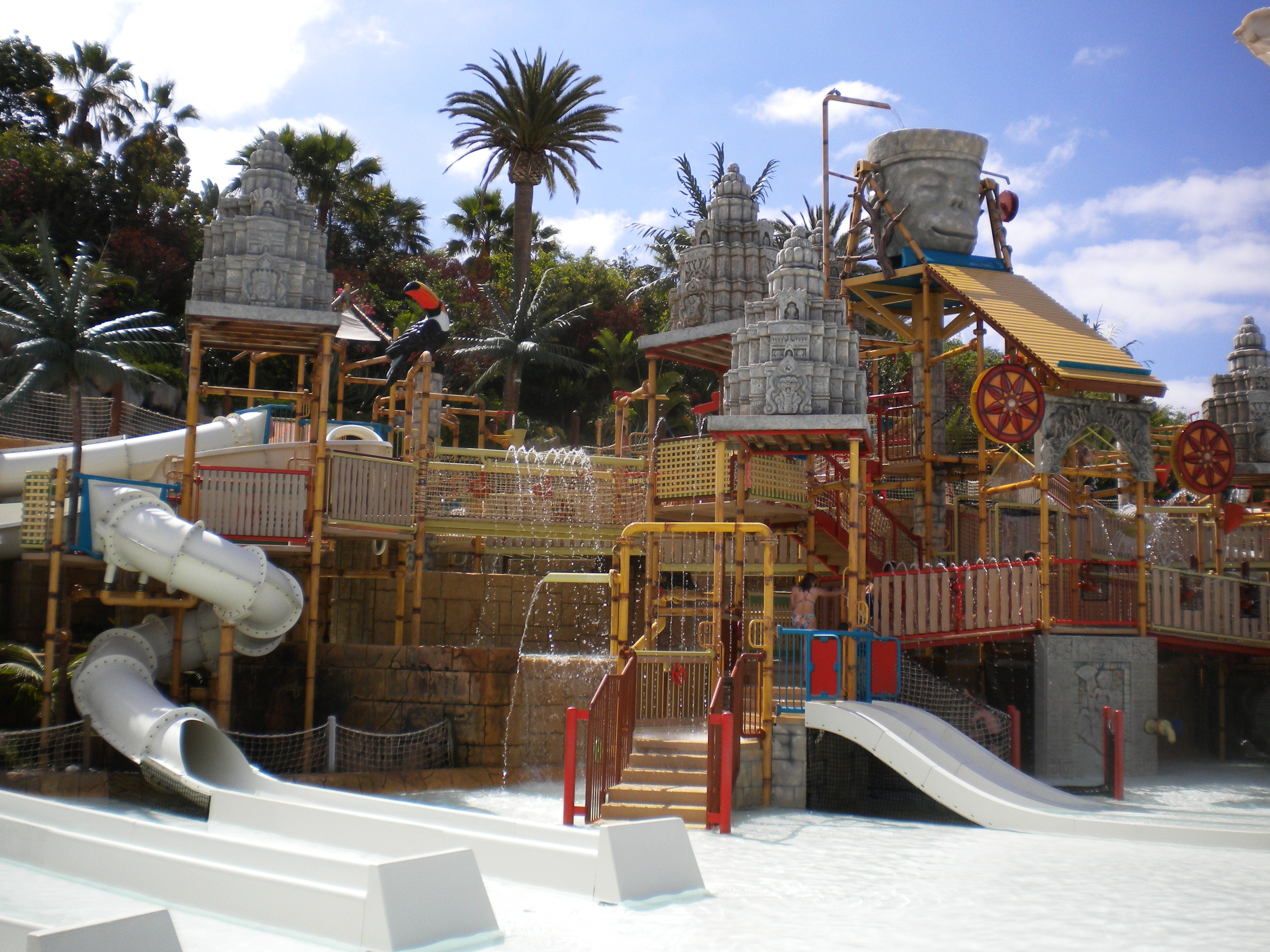
Playground

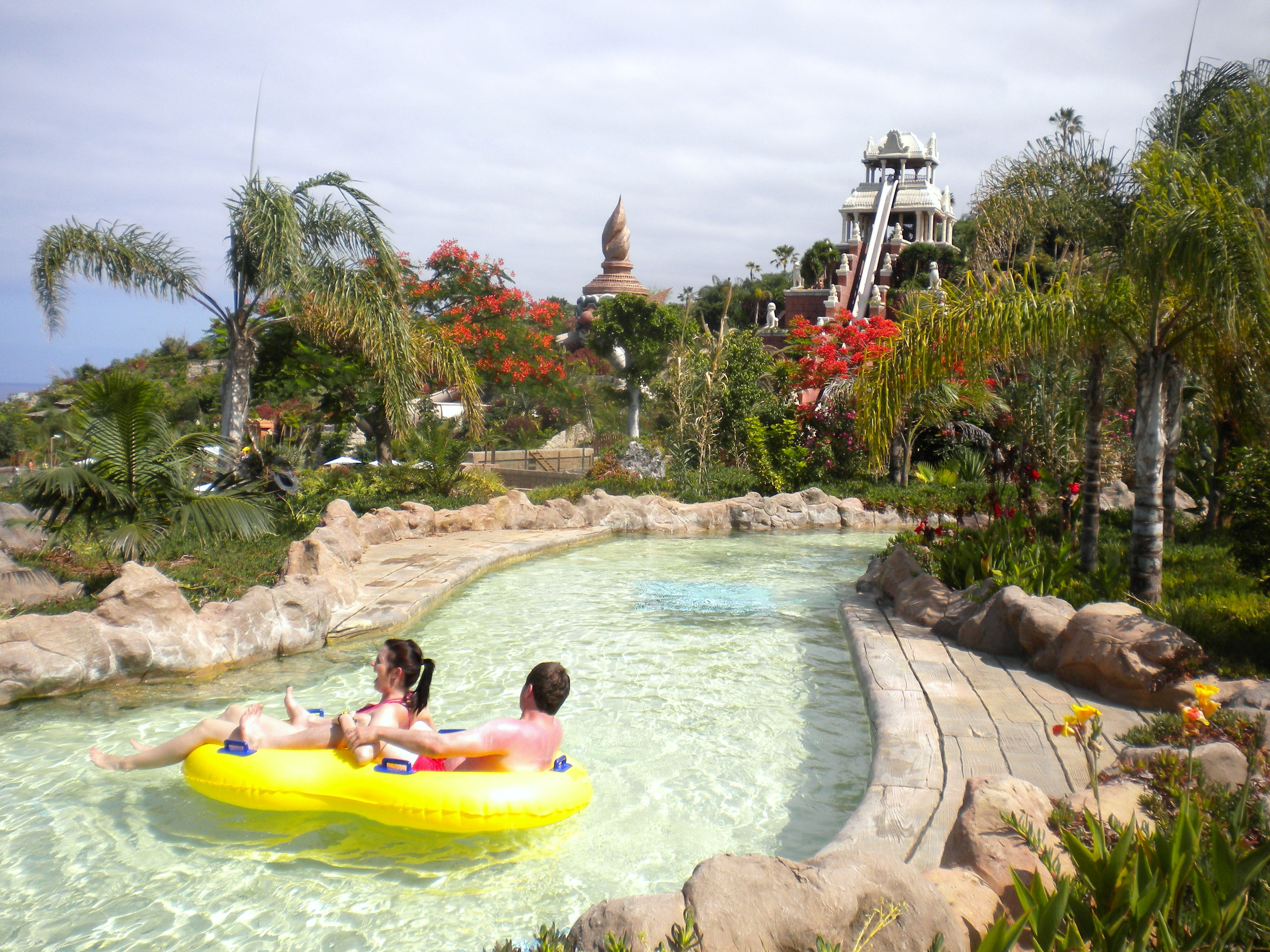
Inflatables

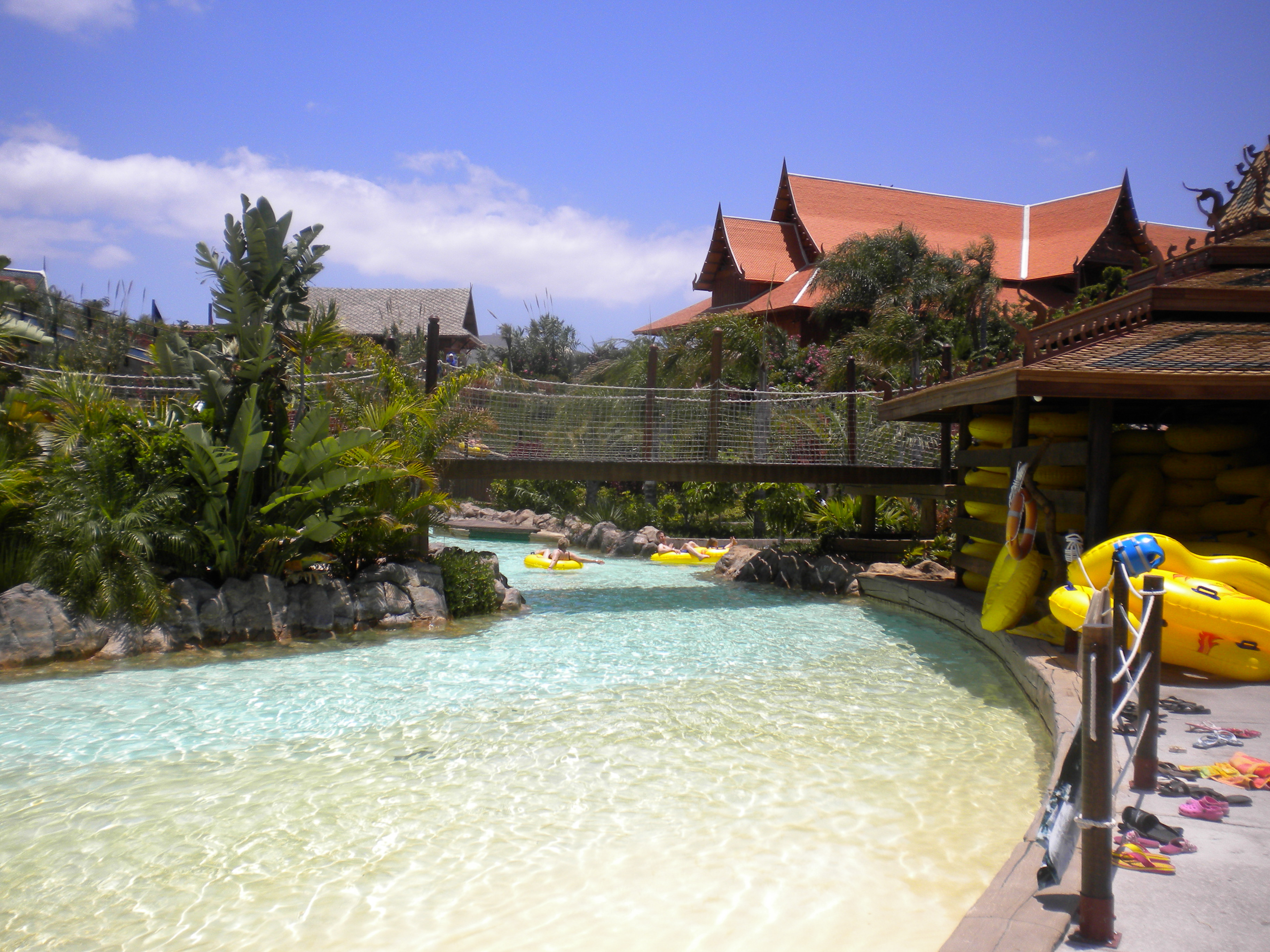
Inflatables

== Rides ==
- Vulcano: a four-person ProSlide BehemothBowl 60 slide with a laser show inside of a large bowl like structure.
- The Dragon: a ProSlide Tornado 60 with a 20-meter (66 ft)-wide funnel and a large dragon model overlooking the drop.
- Wave Palace: a wave pool manufactured by Murphys Waves Ltd in Scotland with an artificial white sand beach. At 3.3 meters (11 ft) high, its waves are the highest of any wave pool in the World. The park's surfing school will give surfing lessons at the Wave Palace.
- Naga Racer: a six-lane ProSlide ProRacer mat racing slide.
- The Giant: twin ProSlide CannonBowl 40s, one moving clockwise and one moving counterclockwise depending on whether you are a double or single rider.
- Tower of Power: a vertical, transparent ProSlide Freefall which sends riders through an area with sharks, stingrays and fish.
- Mai Thai River: the world's longest lazy river, which also has the highest elevation of any lazy river at 8 meters (26 ft). The river gives riders an option at the end to divert into a lift which leads to a slide, which leads to the riders viewing some sharks.
- Jungle Snakes: four twisting ProSlide PipeLine slides which follow the park's terrain. They are Cobra, Boa, Viper and Python. Two are standard PipeLine slides, and two are Turbo PipeLines, based on their speeds.
- Lost City: a children's play structure with 120 games.
- Mekong Rapids: a ProSlide Mammoth 4 person family raft ride river rapids ride.
- Kinnaree: A new four-person 200-meter (660 ft) long ProSlide Tornado24 going into a TornadoWave 60 opened in 2012.
- Singha: a 2015 ProSlide hybrid of a RocketBlast and FlyingSaucer 45 which sends riders upwards and through multiple Flying Saucer features. It reaches speeds of 18 m/s. This was made in conjunction with the Thai beer brand Singha which features its logo around the ride.
- Patong Rapids: this family raft ride opened in 2018 and it's situated next to Mekong Rapids. It is a world's first version of a ProSlide Mammoth going into a double FlyingSaucer 45 feature.
- Coco Beach Wave Pool: Completed in November 2018 the newly installed unique shallow water wave pool by Murphys Waves Ltd has been specially designed for children and younger family members.
- Saifa: a 2023 high-speed dual race water coaster with two parallel lanes where riders compete with each other in a downhill race.

== Additional Services ==
Siam Park implements a variety of safety measures to ensure guest well-being. The park operates a full-time team of lifeguards and has an on-site medical facility available throughout the day. Routine maintenance and safety inspections are conducted regularly across attractions, including water slides and pools.

For younger visitors, the park features Sawasdee, a dedicated area designed specifically for children. This section replicates some of the larger park’s attractions in a smaller, age-appropriate format, allowing children to enjoy water play in a supervised, themed environment.

== Technical information ==
The park is built on a hill, which permits the slides to follow the park's terrain similar to terrain roller coasters. Hence, they lack the prominent support structure present in most water slides. The park's water is heated to 25 °C (77 °F). Kiessling calls Siam Park the "first air conditioned outdoor aquatic park in the world".

To conserve the island's water, Siam Park has a desalination plant on site, which desalinates 700 cubic meters (25,000 ft^{3}) of sea water per day. After the water is used in the rides, the park recycles the water by using it to water the park's plants. In addition, Siam Park has the first natural gas plant in the Canary Islands.

== Records ==
- Travellers' Choice Winner Tripadvisor: World's Best Waterpark: 2014, 2015, 2016, 2017, 2018, 2019, 2020, 2021, 2022.
- Travellers' Choice Winner Tripadvisor: World's Best Amusement Park: 2023.
