= Casa Fuerte de Adeje =

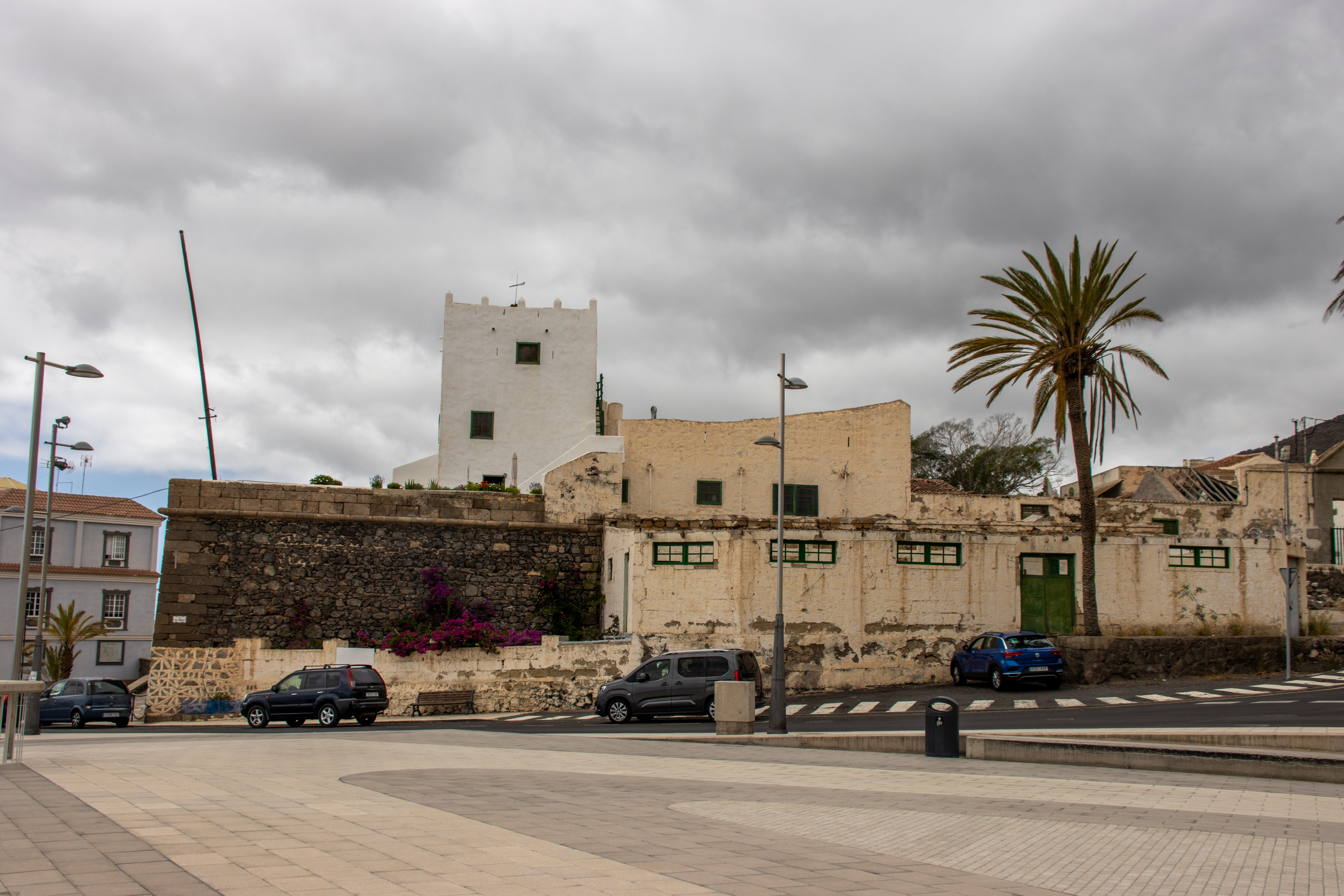
- The eastern front of the structure in 2020

- Location within Tenerife

General information
- Status: ruined and abandoned
- Type: fortified building complex
- Location: Adeje, Tenerife, Spain
- Coordinates: 28°07′27″N 16°43′34″W
- Estimated completion: 1556
- Renovated: 1700s

Design and construction
- Designations: Bien de Interés Cultural (1986–); Red List of Endangered Heritage item (2019–)

Website
- www.cafutenerife.com

Casa Fuerte de Adeje (Adeje Strong House) is a fortified building complex in Adeje, Tenerife, Spain. A strong house was constructed around 1556 to protect a sugar mill, and the site was subsequently significantly expanded. The building complex was renovated in the 1700s before a fire left it in ruins in 1902, a state in which it remains today, leading to its inclusion on the Spanish Redlist of endangered heritage in 2019. Since then some restoration work has taken place and part of the monument has been opened to the public for daily visits.

== Construction ==
The initial construction at the site was a sugar mill built by the Genoese Ponte family, which was powered by water from the nearby Barranco del Infierno. However, in the 1500s pirate attacks were common in the Adeje region. In 1553, Pedro Ponte requested permission to build a fortification in Adeje to protect his sugar mill against their attacks. Permission was granted on 2 May 1555. The strong house was subsequently constructed around 1556, and it is one of the oldest buildings on Tenerife.

It is located adjacent to the Santa Úrsula Church, in the oldest part of Adeje. It became the centre for politics, economy and social activity in the area for the next 300 years, known for its camels, horses, and black slaves. It also employed workers, butlers and administrators.

== Layout ==
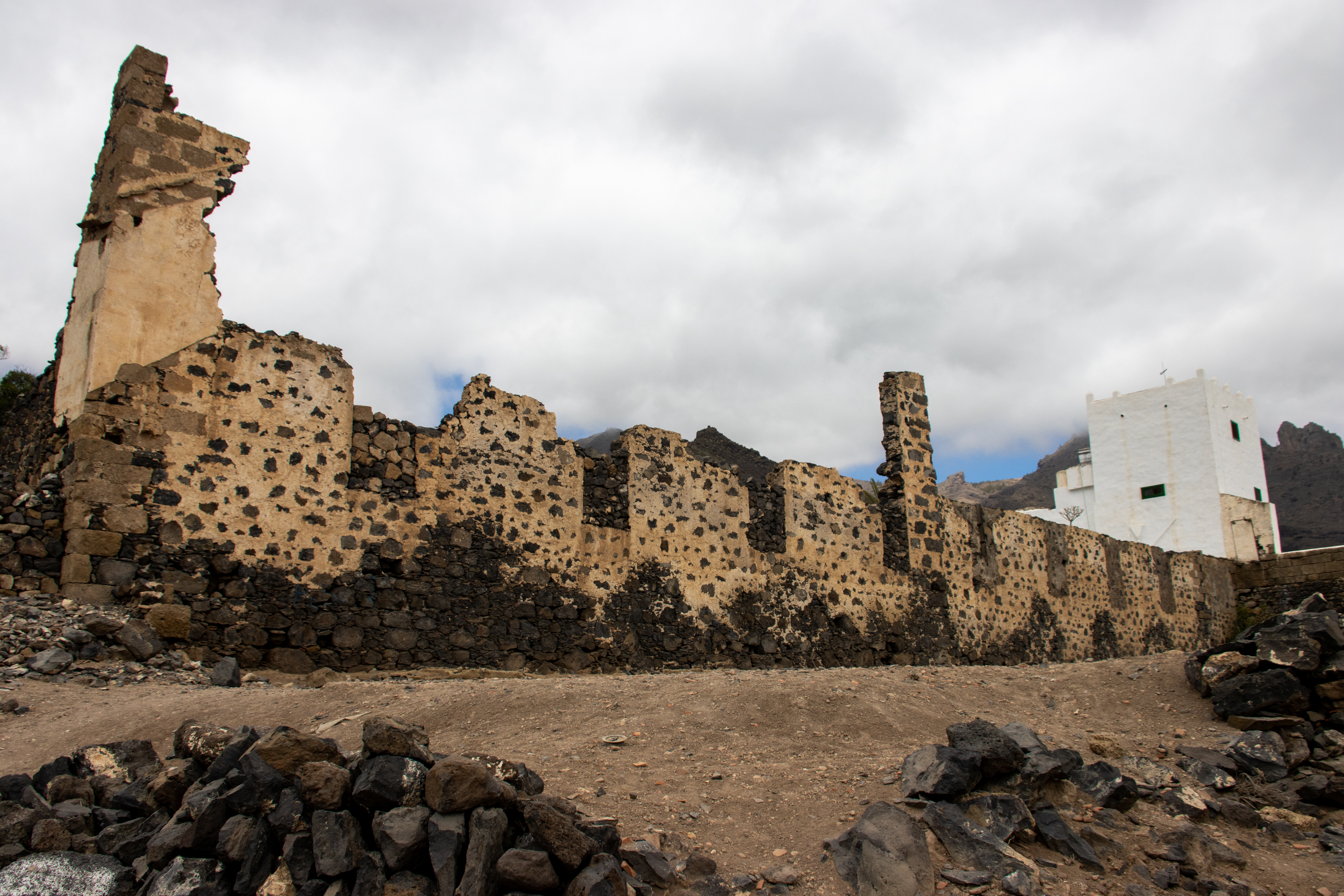
The strong house above the ruins on the southern side

The site turned into a large complex with multiple buildings spread over a square of around 7,200 square metres (78,000 sq ft). The earliest known plan of the structure was made in 1873.

The complex had a single entrance on the east façade, topped by a pediment, that leads to a central paved courtyard surrounded by buildings. A crenellated watchtower and gun platform looks over the Atlantic Ocean on the south side; this was initially also used as a gunpowder store and prison and later became the administrator's residence.

Also on the south side of the complex were rooms for the residence of the Marquis of Adeje and the archives and accounting, plus a barn and pantries. In the centre were the smithy, stables, and furnace (later turned into a two-storey house), with the sugar mill behind them. Slave quarters were to the right of the main entrance. The complex also housed a bakery, a granary, stables, and a public chapel.

On 28 August 1651 an audit showed that the armament of the strong house was 9-10 cannon, 56 muskets, and 46 pikes, along with a trumpet. By 1655 this had increased to 17 cannon with 400 cannonballs. By 1737 this decreased to just 5 cannon.

== Later history ==
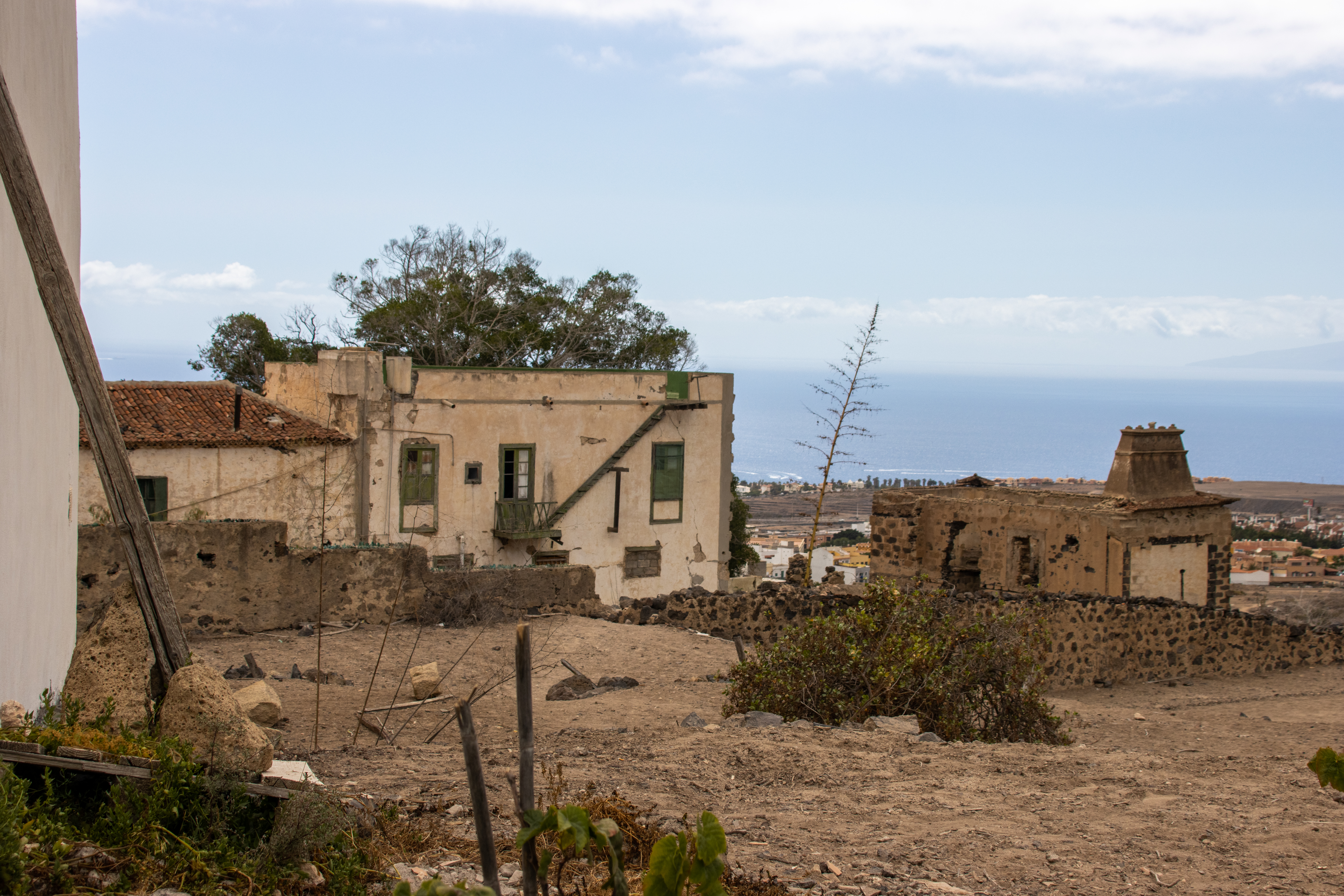
A view inside the complex from the north side

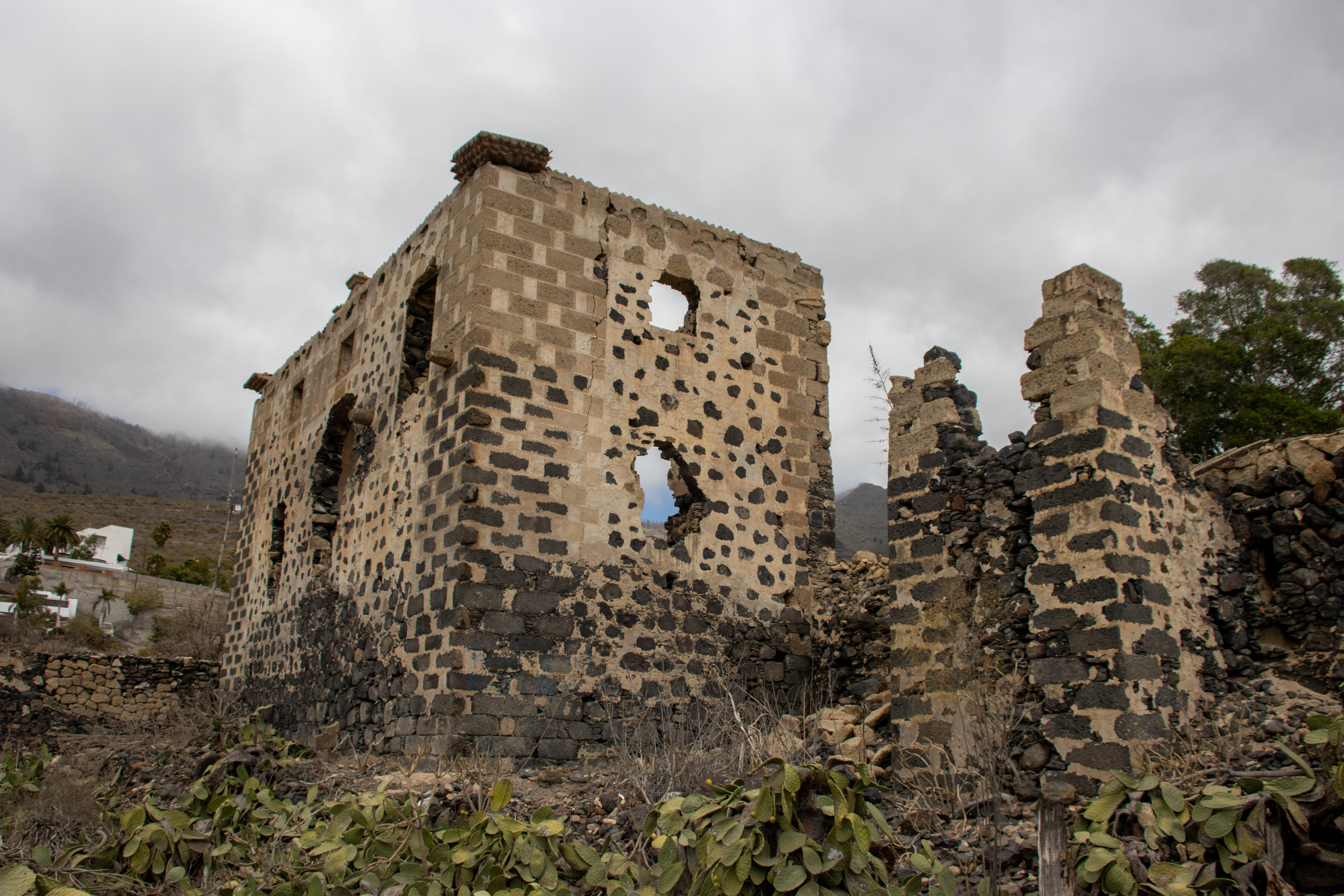
The ruins on the west side

The complex was renovated in the 18th century by the Marques de Adeje at the time, Domingo José de Herrera y Rojas, who was the last Marquis to live in the building. From 1766 onwards the owners resided in Madrid. As of 1779, 57 people lived in the complex. The sugar mill was the oldest in Tenerife when it stopped operating in 1811 due to poor crops from the cane fields, which were subsequently used for vineyards and fruit plantations.

On 9 April 1902, the entire structure caught fire. The tower and entrance gate survived, along with the walls of the kitchen, parts of the enclosure, and the bakery. The animals and the family archives also survived, with the archives subsequently moved to a museum; they are now in the Museo Canario and are available online at archivohistoricoadeje.es. Consisting of four large cabinets of documents, the archives were described by Sabin Berthelot as "the Treasury of the Canaries". Furniture, paintings, chain mail and weapons from the strong house also survived as they had previously been moved to Madrid.

In 1904, the Curbelo de Gran Canaria family moved into the complex, and constructed new buildings inside the complex and outside its walls, particularly at the eastern front of the complex, which was previously an open yard. The land was used to produce tomatoes, as well as bananas, aubergines, and oranges and lemons, that were packaged on site and exported to the Spanish mainland and the rest of Europe. Around 40-50 people were employed on the site. In the 1980s, competition from elsewhere led to the closure of the packing plant, although the growing of tomatoes at the site continued until the early 2000s under the San Sebastian cooperative.

On 7 February 1986 it was protected as a structure of historical interest to the Canary Islands. It was added to the Spanish Redlist (lista rojo) of endangered heritage on 13 May 2019 as it is currently ruined and was abandoned, with no conservation work taking place. Since then, some work took place from 2018 onwards, and a grant was given in 2021 to improve the facade, restore several roofs, and continue restoring the strong house.

== Current status ==
Part of the complex is now open to the public and can be visited. It is open for visitors, with no entrance fee, every weekday between 10am and 1pm.
