= Adeje =

- Municipality
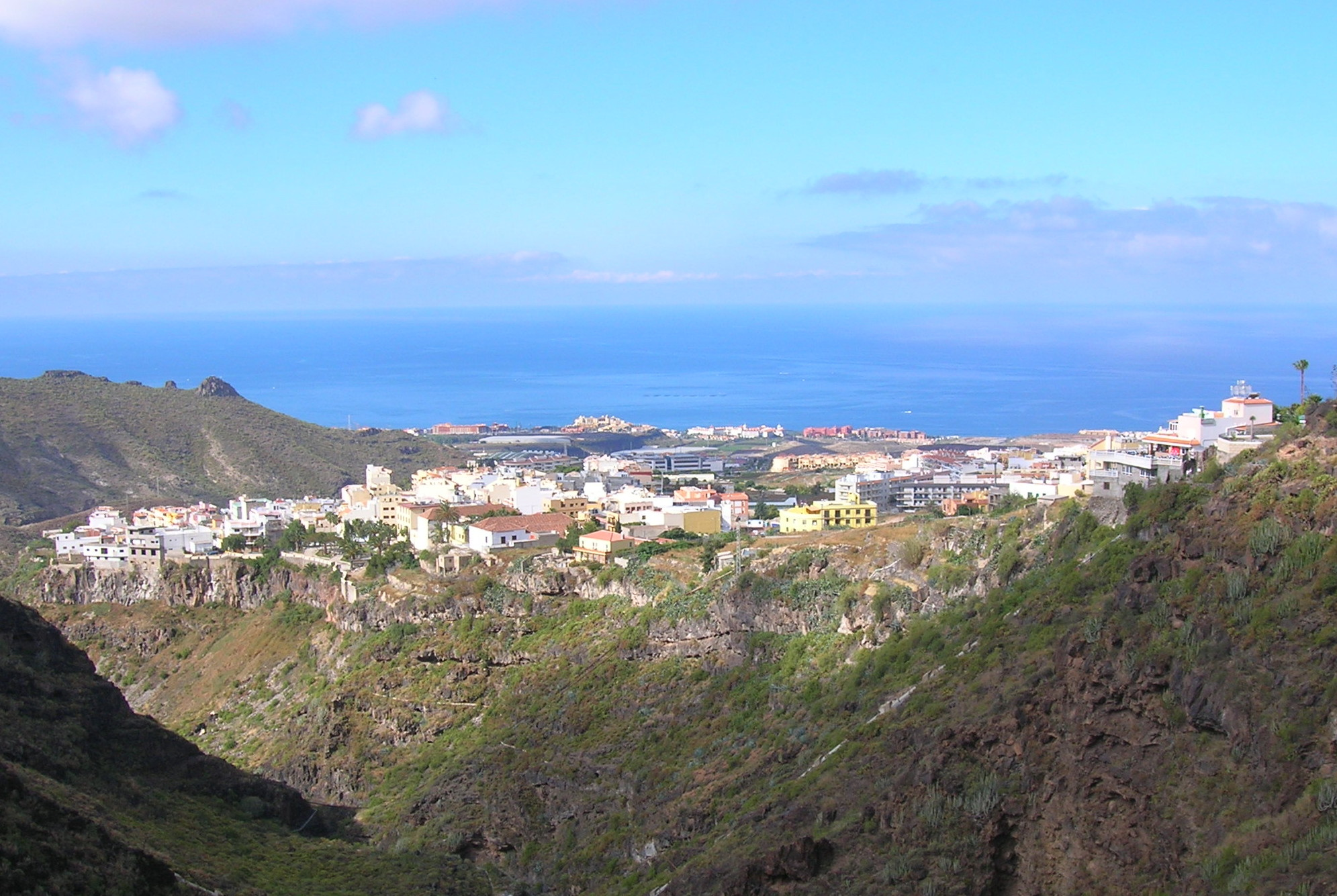

- Flag Coat of arms

- Location in Tenerife Adeje (Canary Islands) Adeje (Spain, Canary Islands)
- Coordinates: 28°7′N 16°43′W
- Country: Spain
- Autonomous community: Canary Islands
- Province: Santa Cruz de Tenerife
- Island: Tenerife

Government
  - Mayor: José Miguel Rodríguez Fraga

Area
  - Total: 105.95 km^{2} (40.91 sq mi)
- Elevation: 280 m (920 ft)

Population (2025-01-01)
  - Total: 50,021
  - Density: 472.12/km^{2} (1,222.8/sq mi)
- Demonym: Adejeros
- Time zone: UTC+0 (GMT)
- Postal code: 38670
- Climate: BWh
- Website: Official website

Adeje is a town and municipality in the southwestern part of the island of Tenerife, one of the Canary Islands, and part of the province of Santa Cruz de Tenerife, Spain. The town Adeje is located 4 km from the coast, 8 km north of the resort town Los Cristianos, 60 km southwest of the island capital Santa Cruz de Tenerife and about 17 km northwest of Tenerife South Airport.

Adeje is the western terminus of the TF-1 motorway, which connects it with the south and east coast of the island. The Barranco del Infierno gorge is located in the municipality.

Its economy is based on business, tourism and agriculture. Adeje is also home to the large water park Siam Park, which is considered one of the most prestigious water parks in the world. Adeje is an important tourist center both on the island and nationally and internationally. This municipality has the highest concentration of 5 star hotels in Europe and also has what is considered the best luxury hotel in Spain according to World Travel Awards.

== History ==
A hundred years before the Spanish conquest (1494), this place was the capital of the Menceyato of Adeje, one of the guanches (local kingdoms) in which the island was divided. It is now one of the most important tourist cities in the Canary Islands.

== Communities ==
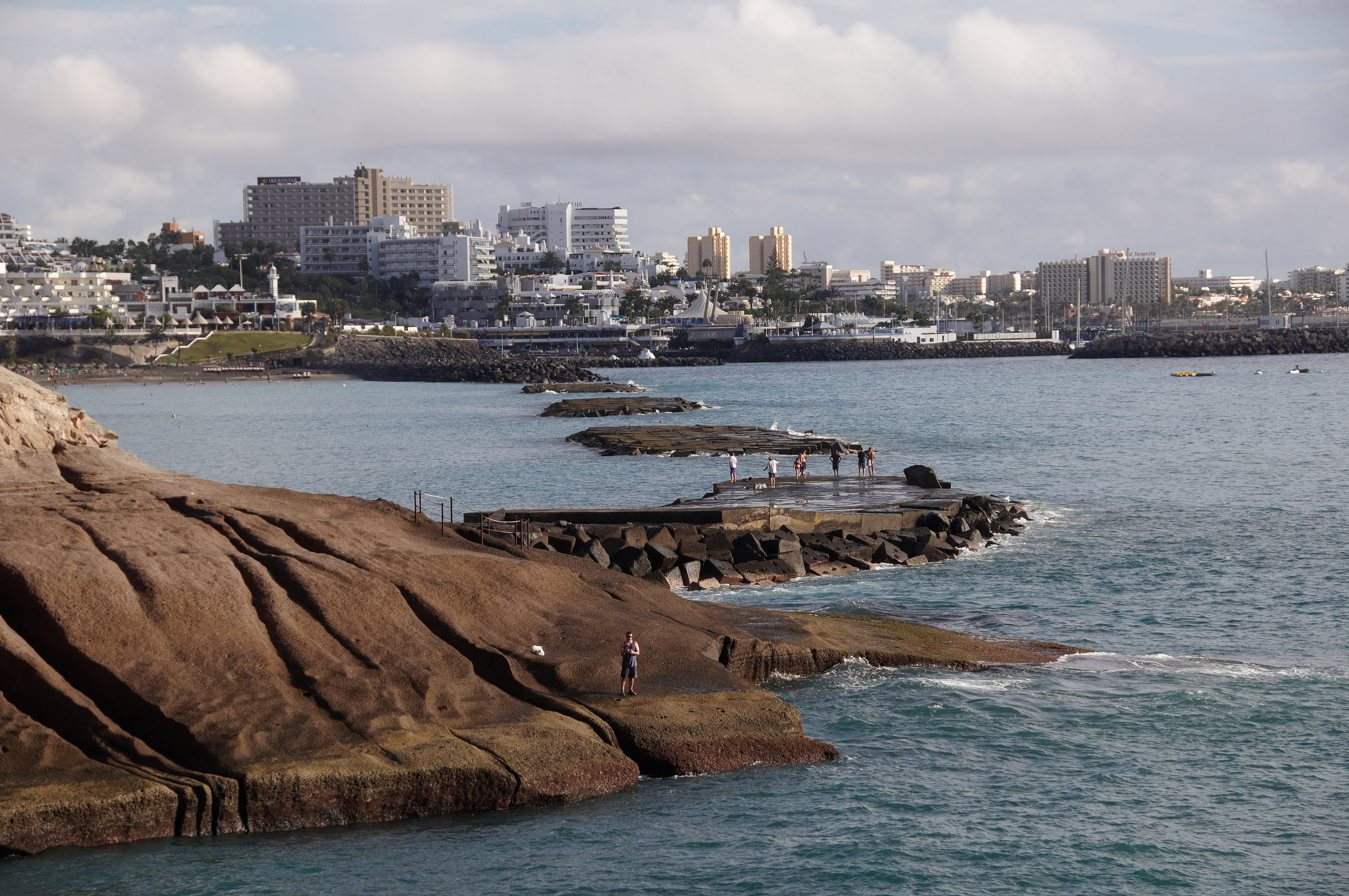
Adeje beach

Many seaside communities of Adeje are major tourist hot spots. The main communities there are:

- Costa Adeje
- Playa Paraiso
- La Caleta
- Playa Fañabe
- Callao Salvaje

== Shopping ==
=== Siam Mall ===
Located next to the water kingdom of Siam Park, Siam Mall is a shopping center with two floors, alongside an underground parking lot with 1,100 free spaces.

== Sights ==
- Casa Fuerte de Adeje
- Iglesia de Santa Úrsula
- Antiguo Convento Franciscano de Nuestra Señora de Guadalupe y San Pablo
- Conjunto Histórico del Caserío de Taucho
- Siam Park

=== Beaches ===
Adeje beaches include:

- Playa Fañabé
- Playa del Duque
- Playa de Torviscas
- Playa la Pinta
- Playa Ajabo
- Playa San Juan
- Playa del Bobo
- Playa del puerto de Colón
- Playa Blanca
- Playa de Troya

== Demography ==
Adeje has a total population of 50.549 inhabitants (INE 2024)

Population of Adeje (2022)
Nationality	Males	Females	Total	%	Proportion
Spanish	13 179	12 779	25 958	52.6 %	
Foreign	11 614	11 698	23 312	47.3 %	

Foreign nationalities in Adeje (2022)
Country	Males	Females	Total	%	Proportion
Italy	2972	2406	5378	23.1 %	
United Kingdom	1790	1830	3620	15.5 %	
Russia	613	876	1489	6.4 %	
Romania	525	582	1107	4.7 %	
Germany	387	455	842	3.6 %	
China	409	369	778	3.3 %	
France	365	377	742	3.2 %	
Morocco	476	265	741	3.2 %	
Poland	270	380	650	2.8 %	
Venezuela	286	341	627	2.7 %	
Colombia	215	262	477	2.0 %	
Bulgaria	206	221	427	1.8 %	
Ukraine	140	183	323	1.4 %	
Argentina	127	130	257	1.1 %	
Portugal	124	126	250	1.1 %	
Cuba	112	124	236	1.0 %	
Uruguay	83	87	170	0.7 %	
Senegal	95	23	118	0.5 %	
Pakistan	55	33	88	0.3 %	
Brazil	20	48	68	0.2 %	
Nigeria	28	16	44	0.1 %	
Algeria	14	12	26	0.1 %	
Chile	13	13	26	0.1 %	
Peru	14	11	25	0.1 %	
Dominican Republic	8	15	23	0.09 %	
Ecuador	11	11	22	0.09 %	
Paraguay	4	10	14	0.06 %	
Bolivia	4	3	7	0.03 %	

Distribution (2020)
Locality	Inhabitants
Adeje (main place)	17,077
Armeñime	2134
La Caldera	85
Costa Adeje	20,105
Fañabé	4975
Ifonche y Benítez	40
Los Menores	2005
Tijoco	2609
TOTAL	49,030

== Climate ==
Adeje has a hot desert climate (Köppen: BWh; Trewartha: BWal) with an annual precipitation of only 145.0 millimetres (5.71 in) and no more than 18 days of precipitation.

Climate data for Adeje Climate ID: C419X; coordinates 28°04′53″N 16°42′40″W; elevation: 130 m (430 ft); 1991–2020 normals, extremes 1975–present
Month	Jan	Feb	Mar	Apr	May	Jun	Jul	Aug	Sep	Oct	Nov	Dec	Year
Record high °C (°F)	30.6 (87.1)	31.5 (88.7)	35.1 (95.2)	37.9 (100.2)	34.0 (93.2)	33.7 (92.7)	42.1 (107.8)	44.0 (111.2)	34.6 (94.3)	38.5 (101.3)	36.0 (96.8)	29.9 (85.8)	44.0 (111.2)
Mean daily maximum °C (°F)	22.1 (71.8)	22.0 (71.6)	23.0 (73.4)	23.5 (74.3)	24.5 (76.1)	25.8 (78.4)	27.4 (81.3)	28.5 (83.3)	28.3 (82.9)	27.3 (81.1)	25.2 (77.4)	23.5 (74.3)	25.1 (77.2)
Daily mean °C (°F)	18.1 (64.6)	18.3 (64.9)	18.6 (65.5)	19.6 (67.3)	20.5 (68.9)	22.1 (71.8)	23.4 (74.1)	24.5 (76.1)	23.8 (74.8)	22.8 (73.0)	20.5 (68.9)	18.5 (65.3)	20.9 (69.6)
Mean daily minimum °C (°F)	13.8 (56.8)	14.0 (57.2)	14.2 (57.6)	15.6 (60.1)	16.4 (61.5)	18.2 (64.8)	19.3 (66.7)	20.4 (68.7)	19.3 (66.7)	18.3 (64.9)	15.7 (60.3)	13.4 (56.1)	16.5 (61.7)
Record low °C (°F)	1.6 (34.9)	3.0 (37.4)	3.7 (38.7)	5.2 (41.4)	7.0 (44.6)	8.8 (47.8)	12.0 (53.6)	12.8 (55.0)	11.0 (51.8)	8.1 (46.6)	6.0 (42.8)	2.2 (36.0)	1.6 (34.9)
Average precipitation mm (inches)	17.7 (0.70)	14.5 (0.57)	15.0 (0.59)	5.8 (0.23)	0.9 (0.04)	0.2 (0.01)	trace	1.9 (0.07)	4.2 (0.17)	17.2 (0.68)	24.7 (0.97)	42.9 (1.69)	145.0 (5.71)
Average precipitation days (≥ 1.0 mm)	1.9	1.9	1.5	1.0	0.2	0.1	0.0	0.3	0.7	1.7	1.5	3.3	14.0
Average relative humidity (%)	59	60	63	64	64	67	68	69	69	68	63	59	64
Source: State Meteorological Agency/AEMET OpenData
