= Antonio Silva =

Antonio Silva, António Silva or Antônio Silva can refer to:

- António Costa Silva (born 1952), Portuguese businessman and politician
- António Silva (actor) (1886–1971), Portuguese actor
- Antônio Silva (football manager) (born 1952), Brazilian football manager
- Antônio Silva (fighter) (born 1979), Brazilian mixed martial artist
- António Silva (footballer) (born 2003), Portuguese football defender
- Antônio Tenório Silva (born 1970), Brazilian judoka
- Toñito Silva, Puerto Rican politician
- Tony Silva (born 1960), American aviculturist

== See also ==
- António Silva Cardoso (1928–2014), Angolan politician
- Antônio da Silva
