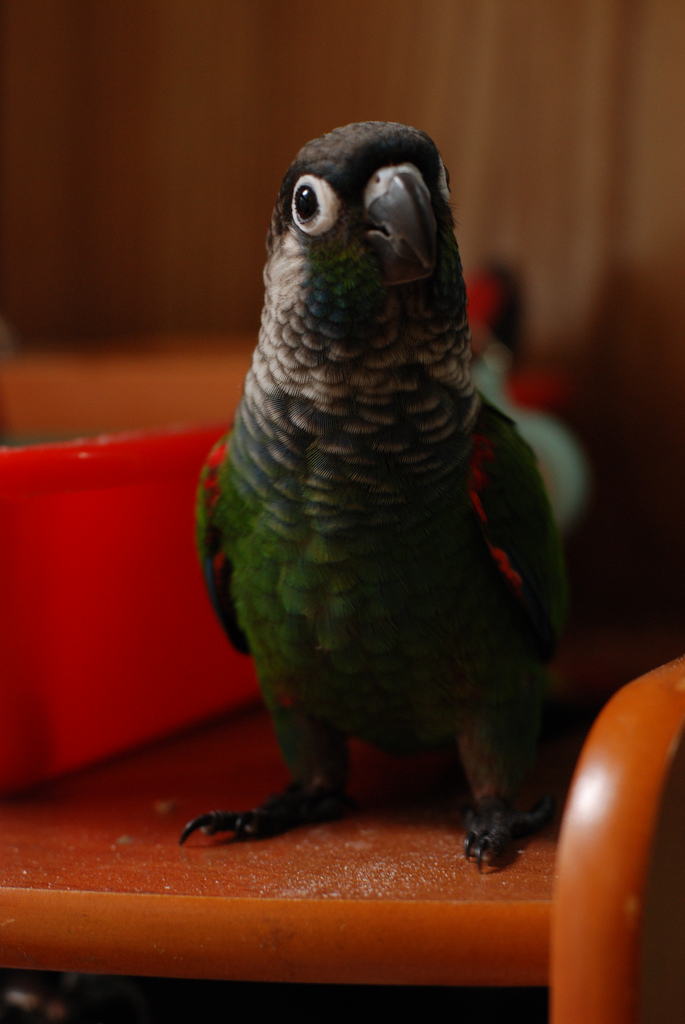

Conservation status
- Vulnerable (IUCN 3.1)
- CITES Appendix II

Scientific classification
- Kingdom: Animalia
- Phylum: Chordata
- Class: Aves
- Order: Psittaciformes
- Family: Psittacidae
- Genus: Pyrrhura
- Species: P. lepida

Binomial name
- Pyrrhura lepida (Wagler, 1832)

= Pearly parakeet =

Species of bird

The pearly parakeet (Pyrrhura lepida), known as the pearly conure in aviculture, is a Vulnerable species in subfamily Arinae of the family Psittacidae, the African and New World parrots. It is endemic to Brazil.

== Taxonomy and systematics ==
The pearly parakeet's taxonomic history is potentially confusing. It was formerly known as Pyrrhura perlata, but following a review it was discovered that the type specimen, long believed to belong to this species, actually was a juvenile of the closely related crimson-bellied parakeet. Consequently, P. perlata was transferred to that species, while under the principle of priority the next name in line for the pearly parakeet, P. lepida, became its valid scientific name.

Three subspecies of the pearly parakeet are recognized, the nominate P. l. lepida (Wagler, 1832), P. l. anerythra (Neumann, 1927), and P. l. coerulescens (Neumann, 1927). In 2011, a review found that lepida and coerulescens were essentially inseparable by their morphology. If this were confirmed genetically it would usually result in coerulescens being a junior synonym of the older name lepida, but upon closer inspection the type specimen of the latter is a hybrid. This invalidates the name lepida and leaves coerulescens as the valid name for the combined lepida and coerulescens and the species as a whole. Subspecies anerythra may in addition warrant elevation to full species status.

== Description ==
The pearly parakeet is 24 to 25 cm (9.4 to 9.8 in) long and weighs 70 to 80 g (2.5 to 2.8 oz). The sexes are the same. Adults of the nominate subspecies have a dark brown crown and buff ear coverts; the rest of their face is dull blue-green with whitish bare skin around the eye. Their upperparts are green with a bluish tinge. Their upper breast and the sides of their neck are brown with buff scaling; the breast has a blue tinge. The rest of their underparts are green with a blue wash. Their wing is mostly green, with black and cobalt blue primaries and red underwing coverts. Their tail's top surface is reddish brown and the lower surface is blackish brown. Their iris is dark brown, their bill brownish black, and their legs slate-black. Immatures are similar to adults. Subspecies P. l. coerulescens has a paler head than the nominate, a grayer throat and upper breast, and a stronger blue tinge in the lower breast. P. l. anerythra has a red tinge instead of blue on the breast and belly and no red on the wing.

== Distribution and habitat ==
The pearly parakeet is found only in north-central Brazil. The nominate subspecies is found in northeastern Pará and northwestern Maranhão states. P. l. coerulescens is found in eastern Pará between the Xingu and Tocantins rivers. P. l. anerythra is found in central and northeastern Maranhão, and a few have been recorded in Mato Grosso. The species inhabits the interior and edges of humid terra firme forest, secondary forest, and sometimes clearings near the forest.

== Behavior ==
=== Movements ===
The pearly parakeet's movements, if any, have not been determined.

=== Feeding ===
The pearly parakeet is known to feed on fruits but further details of its diet are lacking.

=== Breeding ===
Nothing is known about the pearly parakeet's breeding biology.

=== Vocalization ===
The pearly parakeet's calls "possess a rather grating quality, the notes usually given in fast series, e.g. "krree krree krree" or "krek krek krek" " and are given both from a perch and in flight. However, perched birds are often silent. Flocks in flight "call frequently and simultaneously, producing a noisy, harsh and piercing chattering."

== Status ==
The IUCN originally assessed the pearly parakeet as Threatened, then in 2004 as Near Threatened, and since 2012 as Vulnerable. It has a limited range and an unknown population size that is believed to be decreasing. "The most severe threat to the species is the loss of its habitat. Large areas of lowland forests within the range are already severely altered or have been fully cleared." The species occurs in several nominally protected areas but many of them suffer from illegal logging.
