= Tony Silva =

American aviculturist and ornithologist

- Born: 1960 (age 65–66); Cuba
- Known for: Expertise on parrots; Wildlife smuggling
- Criminal charges: Conspiracy to smuggle wildlife; Tax evasion
- Criminal penalty: 82 month prison term; $100,000 fine and 200 hours community service
- Criminal status: Released
- Website: psittaculture.org

Tony Silva, also known as Antonio H. Silva (born 1960) is an American aviculturist and ornithologist, and the author of books and articles about parrots. From 1989 to 1992, he was curator of birds at Loro Parque, the largest parrot park in the world. In 1996, he was convicted of conspiring to smuggle rare parrots into the United States and of tax evasion.

== Early life and career ==
Silva was born in Cuba in 1960 and immigrated to the United States with his parents at a young age. His parents encouraged his love of birds as a hobby to keep him out of trouble, and he began studying, collecting, and breeding birds at age nine. Silva became enamoured with parrots at age 10 when he discovered macaws at a local pet store. When he was in his teens, he became further enamoured after receiving a parakeet. Silva's aviary was originally financed by his father (who owned a company that manufactured television components), later supplemented by his own income from breeding parrots, judging parrot contests, and lecturing and writing about parrots.

Silva began writing articles about birds at age 16, and by age 20 he had published his first book. In 1981, Silva received the Silver Avy Award from the American Federation of Aviculture (AFA) for being the first in the U.S. to successfully breed slender-billed conures in captivity. Silva was self-taught and did not attend university, but by age 25 he was already regarded as an authority on parrots and was respected as a successful breeder. In 1986, Silva became midwestern regional vice-president of the AFA. By 1987, Silva was operating a pet shop called Tropifauna just outside of Chicago. In August 1989, Silva became Curator of Birds at Loro Parque, Tenerife, Canary Islands, the largest parrot park in the world—a position he held until January 1992. Silva travelled extensively to study parrots in the wild, and wrote hundreds of articles and multiple books about parrots.

Silva was well known as a conservationist: he was an outspoken opponent of poaching and smuggling, and he was involved in the early efforts to save the Spix's macaw. Although highly respected among aviculturists, he was viewed with skepticism by the scientific community. To some, Silva was merely a popularizer of others' ideas; to others, he was a "charlatan" who promoted wildlife conservation but who was suspected of engaging in illegal wildlife trade as early as 1980.

== Smuggling ==
Shortly after Silva started selling birds, he is believed to have begun supplementing his own birds with birds obtained on the black market, before eventually moving into smuggling. Between at least 1986 and 1991, Silva conspired to smuggle protected birds valued at more than $1.3 million into the United States, neglecting to declare this income on his taxes. While he was working at Loro Parque, Silva's mother ran the smuggling operation on his behalf.

Birds were provided by co-conspirators in South America and shipped to Argentina or Mexico before being offloaded and smuggled into the United States. Smuggled birds were often concealed by mixing them into a shipment of legally imported birds; Silva and his accomplices sneaked out the smuggled birds while the shipment was awaiting quarantine inspection. Other birds were smuggled in plastic tubes, cardboard containers, and false-bottomed suitcases. Many died during transport due to lack of food, water, and fresh air, and many more are thought to have died during capture. Birds were transported to a Chicago-area motel room where they were surgically sexed and furnished with forged documents so they could be sold on the legal market. Some of the birds were publicly advertised for sale in American Cage-bird Magazine.

=== Operation Renegade ===
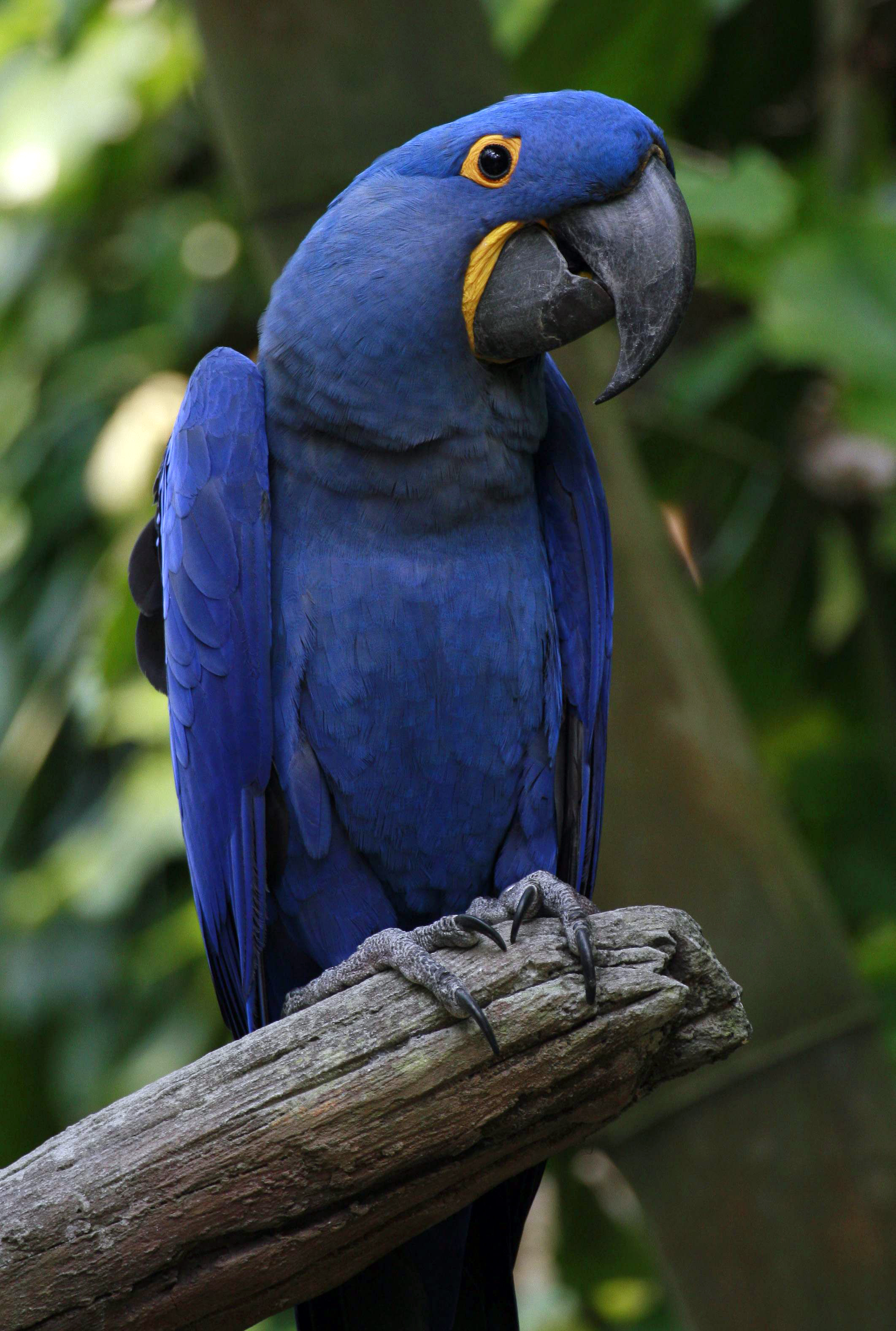
Silva was charged with smuggling at least 186 hyacinth macaws into the United States. At the time, each had a street value of $5,000–$12,000.

In 1989, Silva became a person of interest in an international probe into bird smuggling known as "Operation Renegade" led by the U.S. Fish and Wildlife Service (USFWS). Silva had been brought to the attention of authorities when convicted drug lord Mario Tabraue turned informant, claiming that he had received a shipment of 35 smuggled hyacinth macaws from Silva—which arrived sick and died soon thereafter. In early 1990, Silva's friend Jim Mackman approached authorities after discovering that Silva had been smuggling protected birds. Between 1990 and 1992, Mackman worked as an undercover informant for USFWS, secretly recording more than 100 conversations with Silva and his mother about their smuggling operation. A search warrant executed on 16 January 1992 resulted in the seizure of 103 parrots, some or all of which were protected or illegally imported. The search also revealed ledgers documenting illegal transactions and photographs of birds that had died en route to Silva; prosecutors alleged that Silva used these photographs to justify withholding payments to his supplier.

Between November 1994 and April 1995, Silva was indicted on 20 charges, including charges of conspiracy to commit wildlife smuggling, as well as charges of tax evasion and perjury. Silva was charged with smuggling at least 186 hyacinth macaws into the United States; this comprised 5–10% of the global population. Silva was also charged with illegally trafficking, transporting, or possessing a number of other birds such as crimson-bellied conures, Queen of Bavaria conures, vinaceous amazons, cockatoos, flamingos, and toco toucans. He was suspected of having smuggled Spix's macaws, but this could not be proven.

On 30 January 1996, Silva pleaded guilty as part of a plea bargain to one count of conspiracy to violate wildlife and customs laws and one count of filing a false income tax return. He later attempted to reverse his guilty plea, but this was not permitted by the court. On 18 November 1996, Silva was convicted of smuggling more than 450 protected birds and seven monkeys into the United States. He was sentenced to 82 months in prison, fined $100,000, and ordered to perform 200 hours of community service during a three-year probationary term after his prison sentence. At the time, this was the severest-ever sentence for bird smuggling in the United States, imposed by the judge because of "great cruelty" inflicted upon the birds.

Silva was incarcerated at FPC Duluth. Appeals of his conviction were unsuccessful, as was an attempt to sue the U.S. government for the value of the parrots confiscated during the 1992 search. Silva was released in May 2002.

== Life after prison ==
Despite having pleaded guilty, Silva has publicly maintained his innocence, suggesting that he was importing birds to preserve the species rather than for financial gain. He has also questioned the credibility of the witnesses against him, and he has alleged impropriety by the U.S. government in pursuit of his conviction.

As of 2016, Silva was working for an energy company and was keeping birds as a hobby, as well as operating a rescue centre. He has continued to remain active in aviculture circles as a writer and lecturer.

In 2017, Silva and colleagues proposed a new species of parrot: the blue-winged amazon. The existence of the species has been questioned.

== Selected publications ==
This is an incomplete list of works by Tony Silva.

Books

- Silva, T. & Kotlar, B. (1980). Discus. Tetra Press. ISBN 0969264046
- Silva, T. & Kotlar, B. (1981). Breeding Lovebirds. TFH Publications. ISBN 0-87666-831-7
- Silva, T. & Kotlar, B. (1989). Conures. TFH Publications. ISBN 0-86622-739-3
- Silva, T. (1989). A Monograph of Endangered Parrots. Silvio Mattacchione & Co. ISBN 0969264046
- Silva, T. (1991). Psittaculture: The Breeding, Rearing and Management of Parrots. Silvio Mattacchione & Co. ISBN 1895270022
- Silva, T. (1993). A Monograph Of Macaws and Conures. Silvio Mattacchione & Co. ISBN 1895270006

Peer-reviewed articles

- Jordan, R., & Silva, T. (1991). Breeding and rearing Salvadori's fig parrot: Psittaculirostris salvadorii at Loro Parque, Tenerife, International Zoo Yearbook 30:173-177.
- Silva, T. (1994). Breeding the Spix's Macaw (Cyanopsitta spixii) at Loro Parque, Tenerife, International Zoo Yearbook 33:176-180.
- Silva, T., Guzmán, A., Urantówka, A.D., & Mackiewicz, P. (2017). A new parrot taxon from the Yucatán Peninsula, Mexico—its position within genus Amazona based on morphology and molecular phylogeny. PeerJ 5: e3475.

== See also ==
- Companion parrot
- International parrot trade
