= Free Morgan Foundation =

Dutch based charity organization

- The Foundation's logo
- Type: Non-profit charity
- Purpose: To release Morgan, the orca held at Loro Parque
- Website: www.freemorgan.org

The Free Morgan Foundation is a non-profit charity that advocates the release of Morgan, a female orca held at Loro Parque in Tenerife, Canary Islands. The foundation is made up of a number of independent international experts representing numerous orca research and education organisations, including Orcalab, Orca Network, Orca Research Trust, Centre for Whale Research, and Project SeaWolf Coastal Protection.

== Aim ==
The main aim of the foundation is to allow for the release of Morgan. The proposed release would take place in stages, including releasing her into a sea-pen and eventually into the wild in Norway. Their release plan estimates that it would take approximately 16 weeks post-relocation to Norway for Morgan to be released into the wild.

== Morgan ==
Morgan in August 2010

Morgan was rescued by the Dolfinarium Harderwijk under a rescue, rehabilitation and release permit in 2010 as she was severely emaciated. She was kept in the Dolfinarium for 18 months, where she was rehabilitated. Morgan was moved to Loro Parque, in Tenerife, Canary Islands, in November 2011 after a Dutch court ruled she could be relocated. She is the only orca at Loro Parque who was not captive-born. The Foundation states that Morgan is "bullied and attacked by the other orca on a regular basis" and that Loro Parque is breaching "Morgan’s CITES transport permit, which is exclusively for research purposes".
