= Antonio da Silva =

Antonio da Silva or Anthony Silva or variants may refer to:

- Anthony Silva (politician) (born 1974), American politician and mayor of Stockton, California
- António Silva (footballer) (born 2003), Portuguese football defender
- Antônio Silva (football manager) (born 1952), Brazilian football manager in Japan
- Antônio Silva (fighter) (born 1979), Brazilian mixed martial artist
- António Silva (actor) (1886–1971), Portuguese actor
- Antônio da Silva (footballer) (born 1978), Brazilian footballer
- Toni Conceição (António Conceição da Silva Oliveira, "Toni", born 1961), Portuguese footballer
- Antônio Tenório Silva (born 1970), Brazilian judoka
- Toñito Silva (Antonio Silva Delgado, fl. from 1993), Puerto Rican politician
- Anthony da Silva (born 1980), or Tony, Portuguese footballer
- Antony Silva (Antony Domingo Silva Cano, born 1984), Paraguayan football goalkeeper
- Tony Silva (born 1960), American aviculturist
- Toni Silva (born 1993), Bissau-Guinean footballer
- Tony Sylva (born 1975), Senegalese footballer

== See also ==
- Lucas Silva (footballer, born 1984) (Lucas Antônio Silva de Oliveira), Brazilian footballer
