= Morgan (orca) =

Female captive orca (born c. 2007)

- Morgan in August 2010
- Species: Orcinus orca
- Sex: Female
- Born: c. 2007 (age 18–19)
- Years active: 2010–present
- Mate: Keto (1995–2024)
- Offspring: Ula (2018–2021), Teno (2025-present)
- Weight: 2,088 kg (4,603 lb)
- Height: 17 ft 8 in (5.38 m)

Morgan (born c. 2007) is a female orca who was captured in the Wadden Sea, off the northwestern coast of the Netherlands in June 2010. She was found in an unhealthy condition, severely underweight and malnourished. She lived several months at the Dolfinarium Harderwijk in the Netherlands. After it became clear that the basin at Dolfinarium was too small, multiple options were considered, including releasing Morgan and transferring her to another facility. Over a year later, after litigation and debate between scientists, a Dutch court ruled that she was to be moved. Morgan was transported to the Loro Parque in Tenerife, Spain in November 2011.

== History ==
Upon her rescue, Morgan was administered medical assistance and provided with food. The reason for the orca's rescue was emaciation (Morgan weighed approximately 430 kg or 950 lb) and likely also dehydration. Her body length was 3.5 m (11 ft).

Morgan's future has been the subject of dispute between Harderwijk Dolfinarium and the Free Morgan Foundation. The Free Morgan Foundation includes the orca research and education organisations of Orca Lab, Orca Network, Orca Research Trust, Centre for Whale Research, and Project SeaWolf Coastal Protection. It also includes the conservation and animal welfare groups the Cetacean Society International, Whale and Dolphin Conservation Society and the International Marine Mammal Project of Earth Island, as well as their affiliated scientists and experts.

Harderwijk Dolfinarium stated that they wished to ship Morgan to another marine mammal park after an independent team of experts concluded that she was not a suitable candidate for release into the wild.

The Free Morgan Foundation presented a detailed rehabilitation and release plan. The foundation's plan included a number of phases with contingency plans. The plan incorporated a "soft-release" where Morgan would first be moved to a sea-pen and care for her would continue. The process would, should her health allow, also involve taking Morgan out into the open sea to increase her fitness and reacquaint her with the area. During that time she would be provided with food whilst she continued to readapt to the wild (somewhat like a half-way house for people who are in the process of reintegrating into society).

An attempt to release a captive orca back into the wild has only been conducted once – resulting in a partial success for Keiko, the star in the film Free Willy. The Canadian and United States governments have also successfully released and reintegrated a rescued orca named A73, better known Springer, a situation which bore certain similarities to that of Morgan. Springer, like Morgan, was found alone, many miles from where her family pod is resident and in an emaciated condition. After being kept in a sea pen in Puget Sound and nursed back to health, Springer was then transferred to a sea pen off of northern Vancouver Island from where she was ultimately released. She successfully reintegrated with a resident British Columbia orca pod and is still with that pod today.

Morgan's case, however, presented some key differences to that of Springer. The Northern Resident population of orcas which Springer is a part of have been intensively studied for many decades, with all individuals and the majority of family relations known to researchers. Although Morgan has been reliably established to be a member of the Norwegian fish eating population from call analyses, it has proved impossible to establish her family group. This has tremendous complications for release with animals as family focused as orcas.

Despite some similarities, Morgan's situation is different from that of Luna, a young male orca who became isolated in the Nootka Sound area of Vancouver Island, Canada. In that instance, Luna was never taken into captivity of any form and no official attempts were made to rehabilitate him back into the orca society he came from. Luna died when he was presumed to be run over by a tugboat.

Support for Morgan's release has also come from another group called The Orca Coalition (comprising seven organisations), which has employed a lawyer through funding raised by donations. The Orca Coalition is now intending to confront the Ministry of Economic Affairs, Agriculture and Innovation (Netherlands) to prevent Morgan from being transferred to another marine mammal captive facility and instead for her to be moved to the proposed site of the sea-pen (Deltapark Neeltje Jans in The Netherlands), where she can begin her rehabilitation.

Great emphasis is placed on finding the family or home range of rehabilitated animals of all species which are returned to the wild. The advantage for the animals is wide-ranging and can have many spin-offs to assist them in their return. This includes the social support and local knowledge (such as places to find food). Orcas are well known for their strong social networks, with some populations having such strong bonds that individuals only join a group by being born into it and only leave by dying, whilst others have more of a fluid society with long-term and semi-long term bonds formed. Morgan has been identified as belonging to the Norwegian fish-eating orca community (based on DNA analysis and supporting evidence from acoustical matching).

The social structure of the Norwegian orca has been studied to some degree, and both studies suggest that the "groups seem to be social units based at least partly on stable membership". One study also noted that there was communal care of young which may bode well for Morgan if she is given the opportunity to re-integrate into the population.

Individual Norwegian orcas are known to travel some distance from the site of their original identification. One orca was photographed 700 km (430 mi) from its previous sighting a year earlier, and Morgan herself has travelled from Norway to the Wadden Sea, a distance (depending on exact locations) of approximately 1,200 km (750 mi). Additionally, there have been sightings of orca in the North Sea since Morgan's capture.

If moved to another marine mammal captive facility, Morgan is likely to eventually be used in the captive breeding programs which many aquariums now advocate. She would provide much-needed 'new blood' to prevent a population (or genetic) bottleneck in the captive orca population, as she presumably comes from an orca population not related to those orca currently in captivity.

On 12 October 2011, Agricultural Secretary Henk Bleker announced that Morgan would be transferred to a Spanish marine park known as Loro Parque. Animal activists involved within the Free Morgan Foundation continued their effort to stop the transfer of Morgan to the park, but Morgan was transferred on November 29, 2011. She joins a pod of second generation captive born orcas born in the Sea World Parks in the USA, and a third generation calf born in 2010.

On 3 January 2014, one of the activists against Morgan's captivity, Geoffrey Deckers, said that an orca like Morgan has a value of $7 million. He said that the park's focal reason to adopt Morgan was to bring fresh DNA to their breeding program and to bring an attraction to their park. He instead argued for a policy to euthanize stranded orcas if they could not be returned to the ocean.

On 23 April 2014, the Council of State judged that the transfer to Loro Parque was lawful. The Council reasoned that the park had sufficient knowledge on the treatment of orcas. According to the Council a release for Morgan was not an alternative for reasons that she belonged to a species of social animals while her family was not located and; that Morgan was young and it was unclear whether she could feed herself.

== Life at Loro Parque ==
Upon Morgan's arrival at Loro Parque, she was introduced to one-year-old Adán and seven-year-old Skyla. Morgan was eventually introduced to the park's oldest female, Kohana (along with Skyla). According to various photographic sources, as of 7 December, Morgan has also been introduced to eleven-year-old Tekoa, the park's second oldest male.

In May 2012 Loro Parque announced that Morgan is partially deaf as she suffers a profound hearing deficit that could even be full deafness, as probed by electrophysiological methods. According to the trainers at the park, Morgan barely responds to whistle signals, but she does respond well to hand and arm gestures.

In June 2016, video surfaced of Morgan supposedly beaching herself on stage. The video was released by the animal rights group, the Dolphin Project, along with a video of Morgan banging her head repeatedly against a metal gate inside her enclosure.

On 3 December 2017, it was announced that Morgan was pregnant. Morgan gave birth to her calf on 22 September 2018. She immediately took to the calf, though she failed to nurse the female calf, later named Ula. After months of being separated, the pair were finally reunited in 2019. It was later released that Ula's father was Keto. Ula died on 10 August 2021.

In February 2025, Loro Parque announced that Morgan was pregnant with her second calf. Her calf was born on 31 March 2025. Born head-first, the calf was confirmed to be a male and the father is currently unknown. Morgan has been able to nurse her son, unlike Ula.

== See also ==
- List of individual cetaceans
