= Aviornis =

European association of bird breeders

Aviornis International is a non-profit bird breeders' association in Europe. It brings together breeders and enthusiasts of ornamental birds, such as pheasants and waterfowl. It is one of the most important avicultural organisations in Europe in its field, with around 8,000 members in six European countries. Approximately 625 bird species are successfully kept and bred by its members.

== History ==
Aviornis International was formed in 1973 by a group of aviculturists to be an organisation for bird fanciers who are occupied in aviculture and conserving birds. Subsequently, several chapters were established.

- 1973 – establishment of Aviornis in Tienen, Belgium
- 1976 – Aviornis changes its name to Aviornis International
- 1979 – establishment of Aviornis Netherlands in Burgers' Zoo, Arnhem
- 1985 – establishment of Aviornis Wallonia and Aviornis France
- 1993 – establishment of Aviornis UK, Iberica (Spain and Portugal)
- 2005 – establishment of Aviornis Germany

Aviornis is an organisation for breeders of the wild forms of: Struthioniformes (ostrich), Rheiformes (rheas), Casuariiformes (emus, cassowaries), Tinamiformes (tinamous), Podicipediformes (grebes), Pelecaniformes (cormorants and pelicans), Ciconiiformes (egrets, ibis, spoonbills, flamingos), Anseriformes (screamers, swans, geese, ducks), Galliformes (gallinaceous birds), Gruiformes (cranes and rails), Charadriiformes (plovers, stilts, waders etc.), Pterocliformes (sandgrouse), Columbiformes (pigeons and doves), Cuculiformes (touracos, hoatzin, cuckoos) and Coraciiformes (hornbills, kingfishers, rollers etc.).
