= Loro Parque =

Zoo in Tenerife, Canary Islands

- Loro Parque logotype

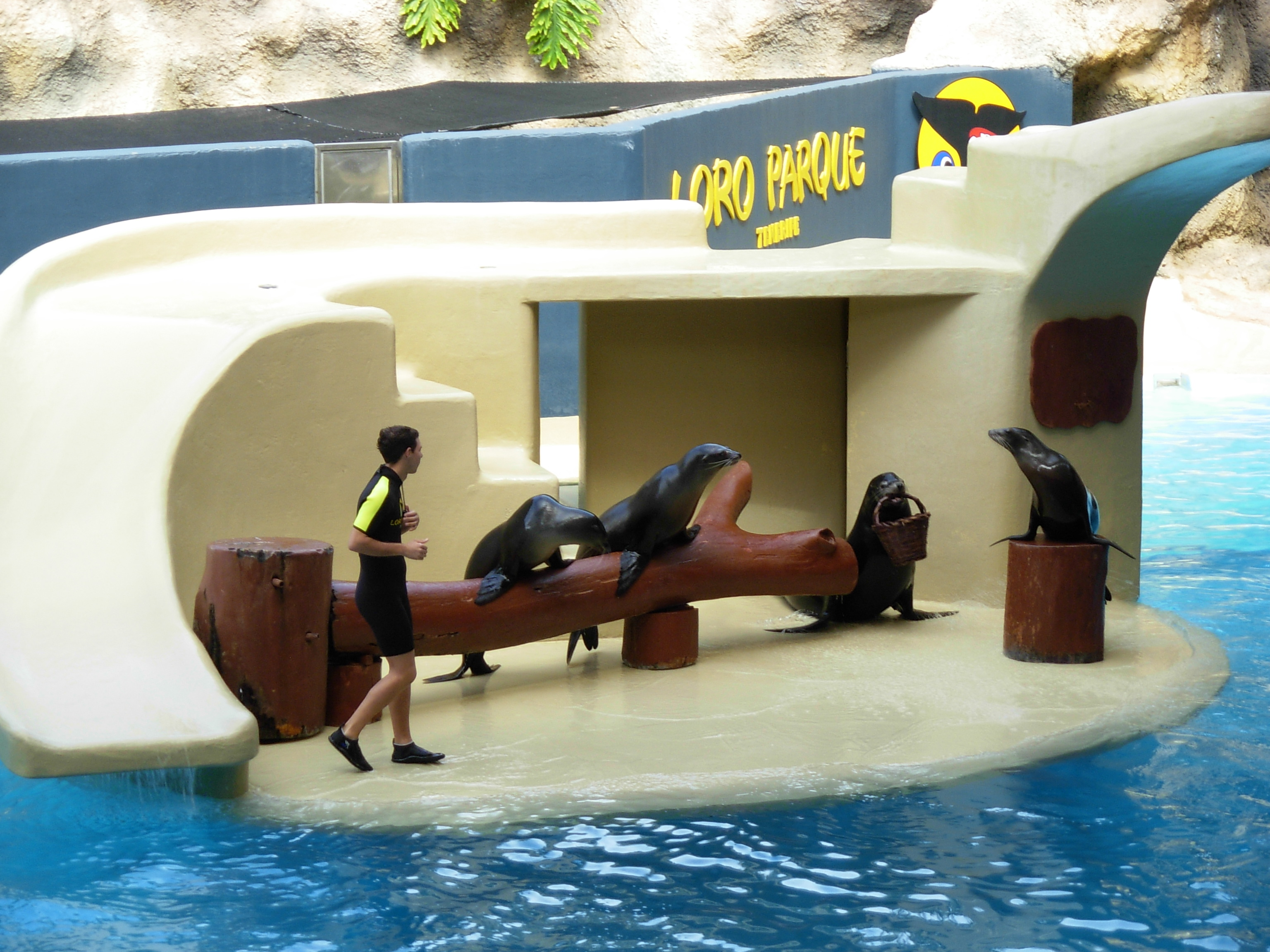
- Sea lions perform in Loro Parque
- Interactive map of Loro Parque
- 28°24′30″N 16°33′51″W
- Date opened: 17 December 1972
- Location: Tenerife, Spain
- Land area: 13.5 ha (33 acres)
- No. of animals: 4,000 (parrots)
- No. of species: about 350 (parrots)
- Website: www.loroparque.com

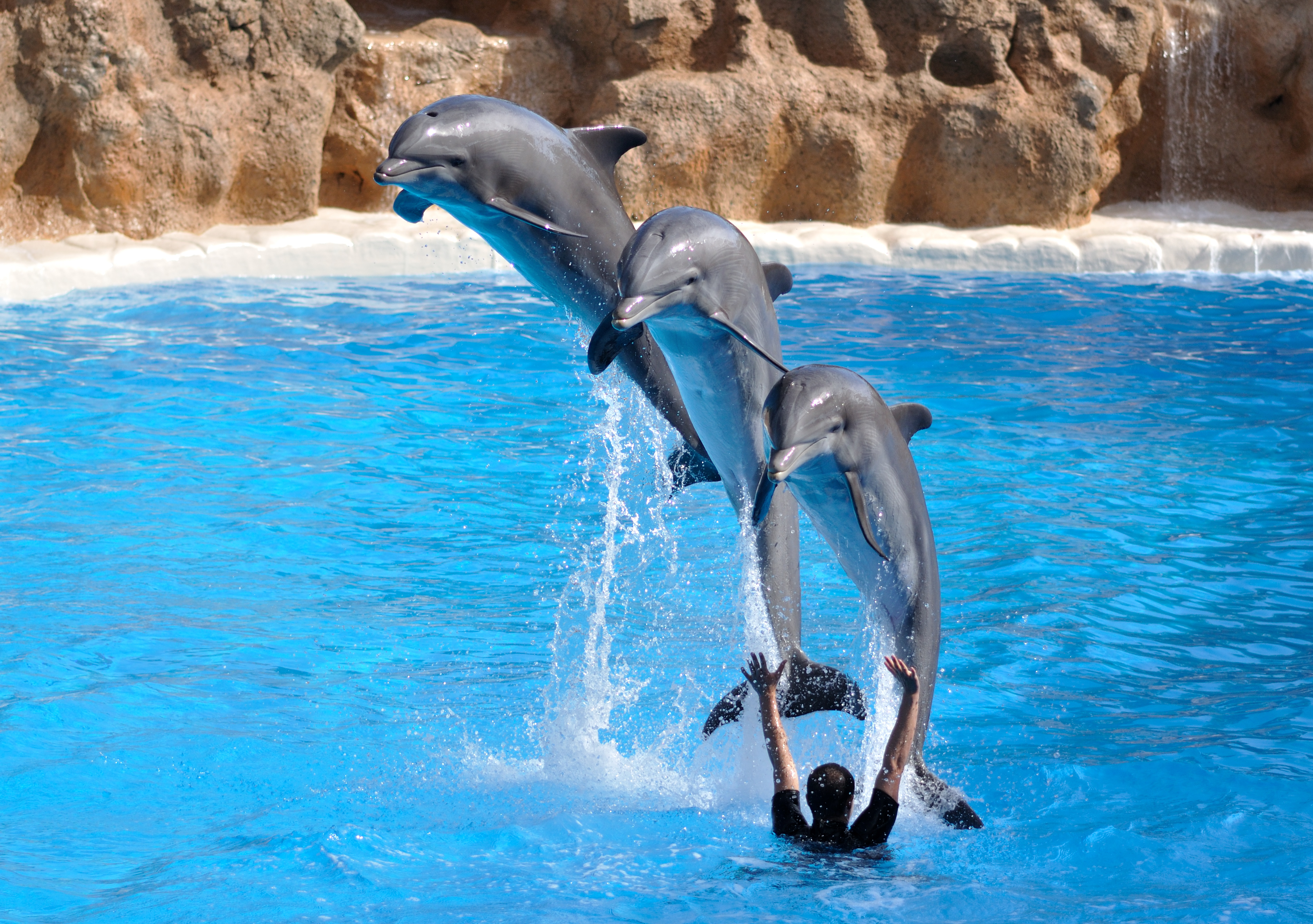
Three bottlenose dolphins perform a stunt in the Loro Parque Dolphin Show

Loro Parque (Spanish for "parrot park") or 'Loro Park' is a 135,000 m^{2} (13.5 ha) zoo on the outskirts of Puerto de la Cruz on Tenerife, Spain where it houses an extensive and diverse reserve of animal and plant species. The park was conceived as a paradise for parrots and has developed over the years into one of the biggest attractions of the Canary Islands, with over 40 million visitors.

== History ==
Since 1972 when the park was founded by Wolfgang Kiessling and opened on 13,000 m^{2} (1.3 ha) with 150 parrots, it has grown to 135,000 m^{2} (13.5 ha) and is home to some 4000 parrots representing 350 species and sub-species, as well as many other animals. This parrot collection is the largest in the world and makes the park one of the main references in the study and conservation of these animals worldwide.

The owners of Loro Parque have constructed another park in the south of the island called Siam Park, which opened in 2008 and claims to be the biggest water park in Europe.

== Birds ==
There are parrots, black swans, golden pheasants, great curassows, laughing kookaburra, penguins, puffins, flamingos and pelicans in the park. Here is the list of some parrot species, including parakeets, macaws, cockatoos and amazons living at Loro Parque:

- Blue-headed parrot
- Burrowing parrot
- Eclectus parrot
- Rainbow lorikeet
- Alexandrine parakeet
- Crimson-bellied parakeet
- Green-cheeked parakeet
- Blue-winged parakeet
- Grey-headed parakeet
- Rose-ringed parakeet
- Blue-headed macaw
- Red-fronted macaw
- Golden-collared macaw
- Scarlet macaw
- Great green macaw
- Blue-and-yellow macaw
- Chestnut-fronted macaw
- Hyacinth macaw
- Red-bellied macaw
- Sulphur-crested cockatoo
- White cockatoo
- Salmon-crested cockatoo
- Blue-eyed cockatoo
- Gang-gang cockatoo
- Palm cockatoo
- Yellow-tailed black cockatoo
- Yellow-crowned amazon
- Red-spectacled amazon
- Red-lored amazon
- Blue-cheeked amazon
- Maroon-fronted parrot
- Kea

== Other animals ==
In addition to the dolphins and penguins, some of the other creatures on display in the park include chimpanzees, western lowland gorillas, emperor tamarins, California sea lions, Asian small-clawed otters, meerkats, red pandas, jaguars, white tigers, lions, pygmy hippos, capybaras, giant anteaters, American alligators, Galápagos tortoises, African spurred tortoises, exotic fish, seahorses, and various sharks.

=== Orcas ===
In February 2006, Loro Parque received four young orcas – two males, Keto (born in 1995) and Tekoa (2000), and two females, Kohana (2002) and Skyla (2004) – on loan from SeaWorld. Except for Keto, all of the orcas were fathered by Tilikum, who was involved in the death of three humans and was the subject of the 2013 documentary Blackfish. SeaWorld sent its own professionals, including trainers, curators and veterinarians, to supplement the staff at Loro Parque to assist with the orcas move. In 2004 and 2005, before the orcas were brought to Loro Parque, eight animal trainers from the park were sent to SeaWorld parks in Texas and Florida for training.

On 13 October 2010, Kohana, an eight-year-old female orca, gave birth to a male calf in the park's "Orca Ocean" exhibit after a four-hour labor. The calf weighed in at about 150 kg (330 lb) and was two meters (6 ft 7 in) long. Kohana rejected her calf, forcing trainers to take the first steps in hand rearing him. Kohana's calf was named Adán, the Spanish form of “Adam”. Adán has been introduced to his uncle-dad Keto, his uncle Tekoa, his mom Kohana, his aunt Skyla, his friend Morgan and Victoria, his deceased little sister.

In November 2011, Loro Parque received its sixth orca, Morgan, who was rescued in the Netherlands on 23 June 2010. After spending a year and a half in a small tank in the Netherlands, amid much controversy, Morgan was moved to Loro Parque. Claims were made that Morgan was unable to be released due to the lack of skills she would need to survive in the wild and that she was only approximately 2 or 3 at the time of her rescue. In 2012, scientists confirmed that Morgan suffered from a hearing loss that could be very severe and even absolute.

On 3 August 2012, Kohana, then ten years old, gave birth to a female calf named Vicky after a two-hour labor. The calf weighed in at 152 kg (335 lb) and measured 2.4 m (7 ft 10 in) long. Vicky calf was also rejected by her mother, resulting in another hand-reared orca. Vicky died unexpectedly on 16 June 2013. Her cause of death was later revealed to be intestinal problems.

In the summer of 2018, SeaWorld relinquished ownership of the orcas, giving full ownership to Loro Parque.

On 11 March 2021, Skyla died, after showing signs of discomfort. Her cause of death was later revealed to be that of gastric torsion.

Kohana died prematurely on 14 September 2022. The theme park said that a preliminary autopsy suggested a cardiac problem.

On 22 November 2024, Keto died, having shown signs of discomfort for a few days prior. The cause of death has not yet been determined.

As of December 2024, there are three orcas in Loro Parque: Tekoa (M-24 years old), Morgan (F-16-17 years old) and Adàn (M-14 years old).

Around 5:26 AM local time on 31 March, 2025, Morgan gave birth to a healthy newborn orca calf. Following this, both orcas were placed in a specialized area where they would receive constant care and to also ensure the safety of them. The calf was male, and was named Teno, who had received constant nursing from Morgan. Additionally, Morgan’s diet was increased by about 30% more fish to ensure she can adequately feed the calf. As of June 2025, Teno is actively growing and remains healthy.

=== Dolphins ===
Loro Parque also presents 10 bottlenose dolphins, including 3 caught in the 1980s off Florida and 7 born in captivity : Paco (M), Ruffles (F), Pacina (F), Ulisse (M), Luna (F), Clara (F), Cesar (M), Achille (M), Ilse (F) and Robin (M).

== Shows ==
Shows in the park include sea lions (5 times a day), dolphins (4 times), parrots (The Loro Show – 6 times), nature vision (an indoor cinema playing a 20 minute long film – 9 times) and the orca show (3 times). Other attractions include the children's playground "Kinderlandia," Gambian Market, a parrot baby station, a huge parrot museum and many restaurants.

The pre-title sequence (narrated by Stephen Fry) of the 2005 movie The Hitchhiker's Guide to the Galaxy was filmed at Loro Parque.

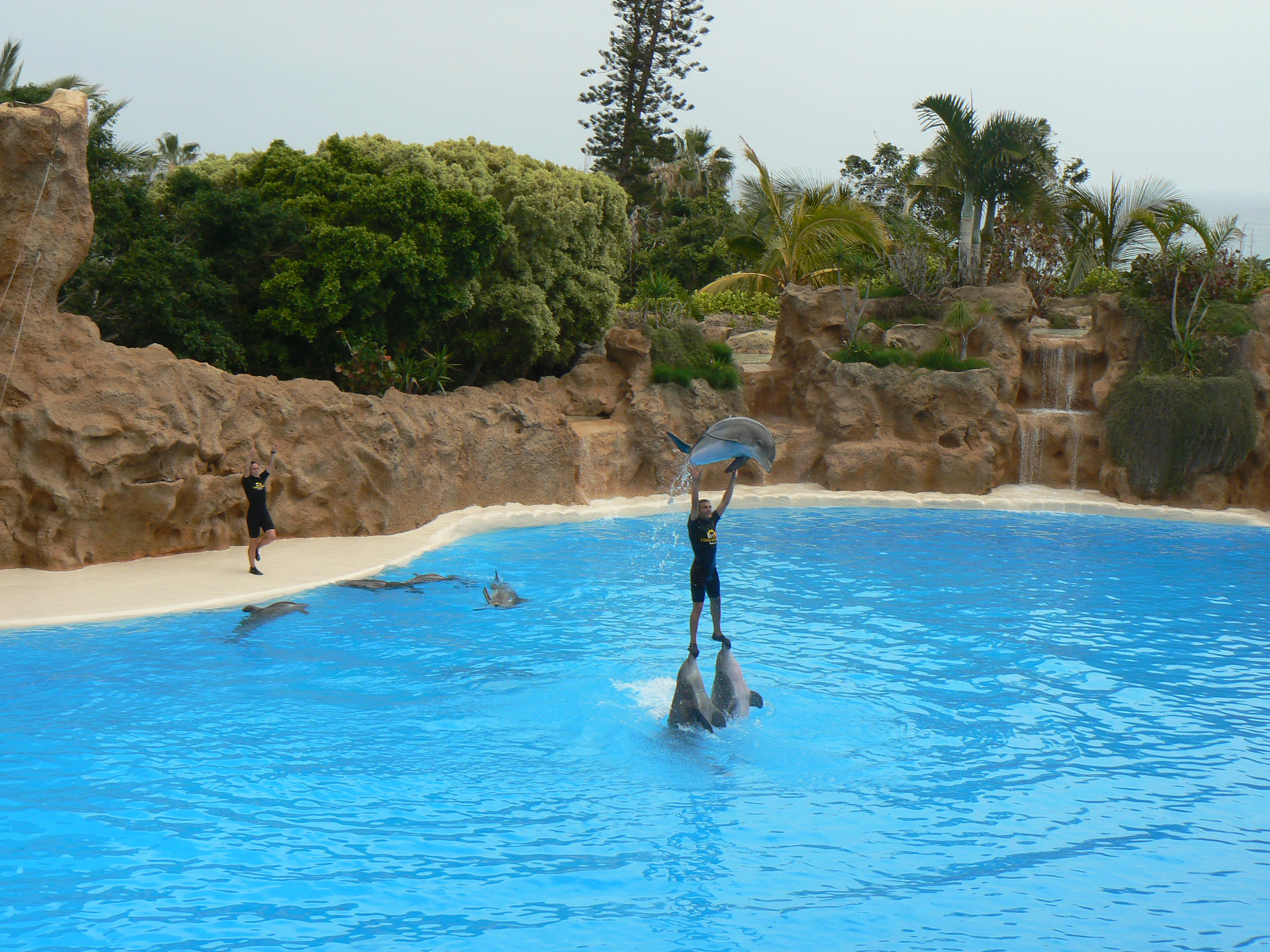
Loro Parque's Dolphin Show

Loro Parque's Orca Show

== Foundation ==
In 1994 Loro Parque founded the Loro Parque Fundación, an international foundation member of IUCN set up to highlight the need for conservation of nature and the environment. The foundation has carried out 82 conservation projects in 28 countries throughout the world, of which 31 are active with approximately 150 people working daily for the conservation of nature. Since its creation they have spent more than $10,000,000 on such projects.

The foundation is particularly active in conserving the most endangered parrot species in the world, both with captive breeding such as with the critically endangered Spix's macaw, and field projects such as with the equally critically endangered indigo-winged parrot). Between 2017 and 2019 the foundation assisted in releasing fourteen captive-bred macaws of the critically endangered Ara ambiguus ssp. guayaquilensis into the private Ayampe Reserve in Esmeraldas Province, Ecuador.

== Incidents ==
In 1996, Tony Silva, Loro Parque's Curator of Birds from 1989 to 1992, was convicted of conspiracy to smuggle rare birds valued at more than US$1.3 million into the United States. Silva began smuggling birds in 1986 and the conspiracy continued while he was curator at Loro Parque.

In October 2007, apprentice trainer Claudia Vollhardt was attacked by Tekoa (an orca) and hospitalised. After this attack, the trainers ceased to do waterwork for more than six months, and never again with Tekoa.

Two years later, on Christmas Eve of 2009, 29-year-old Alexis Martínez was killed by Keto. After spending two and a half minutes at the bottom of the 12-meter deep main pool, his body was retrieved but he could not be revived. He went into cardiac arrest in the ambulance on the way to BelleVue Medical Center in Puerto de la Cruz, and was pronounced dead. His funeral was held the following day, and his ashes were spread at Playa El Socorro at sunset. Since then, the trainers do not enter the water with any of the orcas. The park initially characterized the death as an accident. However, the autopsy report stated that Martínez died due to grave injuries caused by an orca attack, including multiple compression fractures, tears to vital organs, and bite marks. During the investigation into the death of Alex Martinez, it came to light that the park had also mischaracterised to the public the 2007 incident with Tekoa, and claimed it was also an accident rather than an attack. It was also revealed that only half of the original trainers are currently employed in Orca Ocean, Loro Parque's facility for the orcas, and none of the subsequent employees hired have been sent to Sea World parks for training. However, they did pass several training courses under the supervision of the other trained members.

A female orca, Kohana, who is the daughter of the infamous Tilikum, died at Loro Parque aged only twenty years old in September 2022. Kohana's death marks the third killer whale to die at the Loro Parque marine park in the past 18 months.

In August 2021, a three-year-old orca named Ula died, and shortly before that in March 2021, 17-year-old Skyla died.

In the wild, female killer whales can live for up to 80 years.

== Criticism ==
Loro Parque has been criticised by a number of organizations, mostly for its use of orcas. The Free Morgan Foundation campaigns for the release of Morgan, an orca held at Loro Parque, saying that she has been "bullied and attacked by the other orca on a regular basis" and that Tekoa, another orca held at the park, "is the most bitten orca in all the orca held in captivity around the world".

Whale and Dolphin Conservation (WDC) also criticizes Loro Parque's handling of Morgan. Specifically, they stated that "the permit under which Morgan was shipped to Loro Parque" states that "she should be used for scientific research" and that in reality, "Morgan makes daily appearances in the shows doing tricks for the paying public".

PETA also criticizes Loro Parque, stating that "experts have identified health problems and psychological distress in the orcas at Loro Parque". These problems include missing teeth, rake marks and mucus dripping from their eyes. They also mention the abnormal behaviour of "floating on the surface of the water" which they say is "unheard of among wild orcas".

On 29 July 2018 Thomas Cook announced that it would stop selling tickets to Loro Parque over "animal welfare concerns".

== Awards ==
On 27 September 2000, Loro Parque was awarded the most prestigious prize that the Canary Islands Government gives in the field of tourism, the award "Importante del Turismo 2000" (Important Tourism). Román Rodríguez, president of the Government of the Canaries at the time, handed this prize over to Kiessling. This prize gives Loro Parque the gold medal for its contribution to make the Canary Islands a quality tourist destination. Kiessling was also awarded the "Galardones Amables del Turismo y Convivencia Ciudadana 1999" (Award for Friendly Tourism and Citizen Coexistence) by the Centre of Enterprises and Tourism (CIT) of Santa Cruz, Tenerife, at the same time.
