= Igor (walrus) =

Walrus

- Species: Walrus
- Born: 1982 or 1983
- Died: 11 April 2013 (aged 30); Harderwijk, Netherlands
- Known for: Subject of scientific research, playing checkers against world champion and playing in Animal Crackers
- Weight: 1,800 kg (3,968 lb)

Igor (born 1982 or 1983 – 11 April 2013) was a male walrus that lived in the Dolfinarium Harderwijk in the Netherlands, where he was also subject of scientific research. He had played international draughts against world champion Ton Sijbrands. Igor also featured in the television show Animal Crackers with Dutch comedian André van Duin. Near the end of his life Igor fell ill, lost the will to eat and suffered from his shoulder joint. After his condition further deteriorated the Dolfinarium decided to euthanize him. His remains were sent to the faculty of veterinary medicine of Utrecht University for further investigation.

== Subject of research ==
As well as the other walruses at the Dolfinarium, Igor was the subject of scientific research. Igor participated in research concerning the functioning of walrus whiskers. With his whiskers Igor was able to differentiate between circles and triangles, and showed this by shaking his head in different ways. Igor was able to recognize the shapes until they reached the size of the tip of a pen, which showed that walrus whiskers have a similar touch sensitivity as human fingertips. Another study investigated the effects of drilling for oil and gas on walruses by subjecting Igor to different noises by letting him wear headphones.
