= Dolfinarium Harderwijk =

- Dagje Dolfinarium, beleef de magie van dolfijnen (English:Day at Dolfinarium, experience the magic of dolphins)

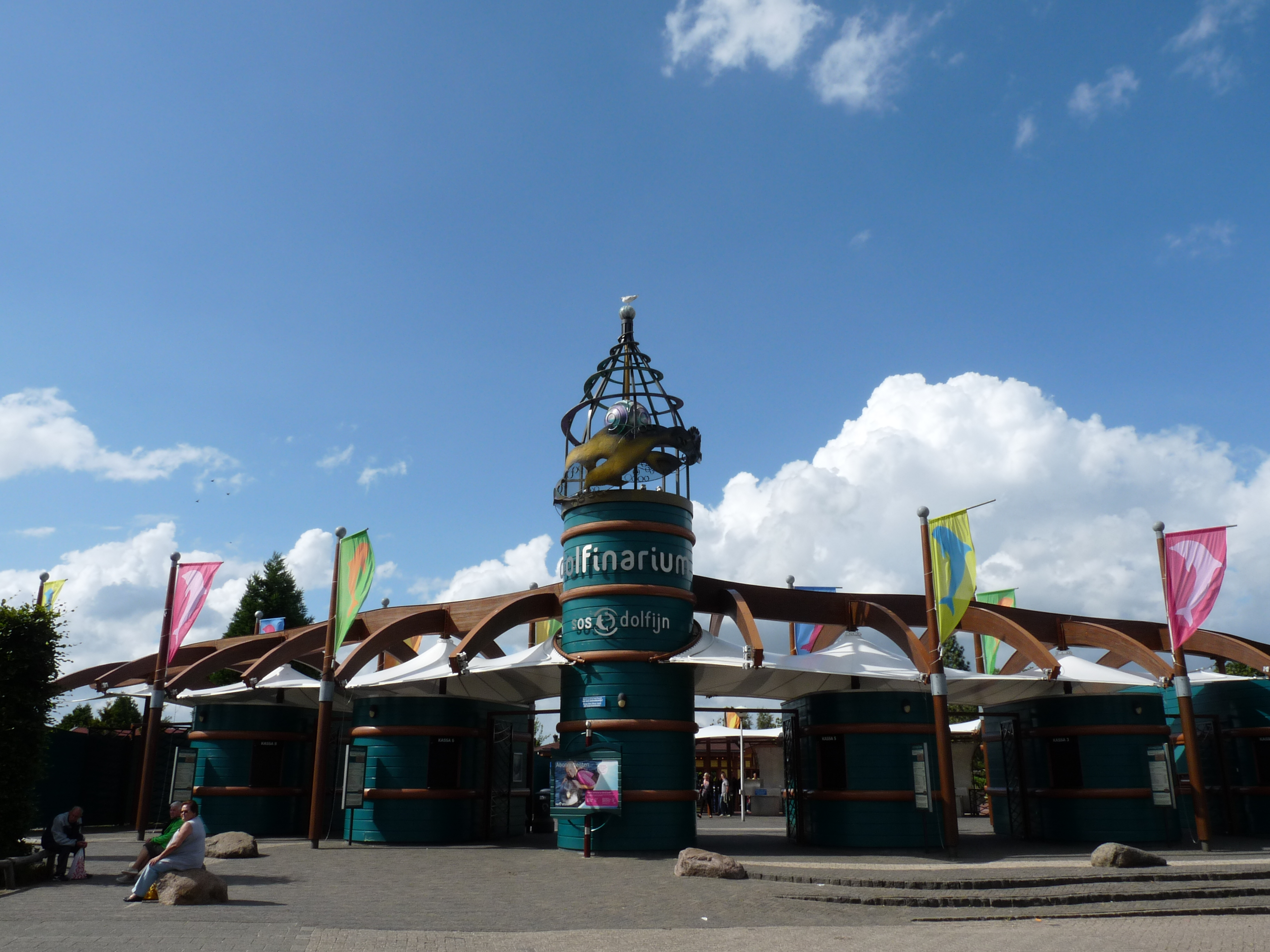
- Entrance to the Dolfinarium
- Interactive map of Dolfinarium Harderwijk
- 52.35410°N 5.61695°E
- Slogan: Dagje Dolfinarium, beleef de magie van dolfijnen. Day at Dolfinarium, experience the magic of dolphins.
- Date opened: 1965
- Location: Harderwijk, the Netherlands
- Volume of largest tank: 15 million liters
- Annual visitors: 586,300 (2016)
- Memberships: "Alliance of Marine Mammal Parks and Aquariums". ammpa.org. AMMPA. "Dutch Zoo Federation". nvdzoos.nl. NVD. "European Association of Zoos and Aquaria". eaza.net. EAZA.
- Owner: Aspro Ocio S.A.
- Website: www.dolfinarium.nl/en

Dolfinarium Harderwijk, better known as the Dolfinarium, is a marine mammal park in Harderwijk, the Netherlands. It is the largest marine mammal park in Europe. Visitor numbers were steady from 2005 to 2011, numbering between 700,000 and 800,000, with only the opening of new attractions responsible for a surge in numbers. In 2012 the Dolfinarium made €12 million in sales, which was around €2,4 million lower than the year before. This was mainly due to a decline in visitor numbers because of orca Morgan leaving the park, and the park temporarily closing down due to the start of construction at the end of the year.

== History ==
Dolfinarium in Harderwijk, Netherlands, Dutch newsreel from 1966

In 1955 businessman Frits den Herder together with his brother Coen, the owner of a local shipping company and playground, started collecting sea mammals. They started by building a dolphinarium (in Dutch: dolfinarium). In 1965 the park was opened to the general public. The goal of the park according to Frits was to "make the Dutch population show respect and awe for these most special and mythical sea mammals". In 1969 the characteristic dome was built, and in the year after opening the Dolfinarium welcomed one million visitors.

In the seventies the Dolfinarium expanded its collection of animals and built more enclosures. In 1976 the Icelandic orca Gudrun was added to the collection. At the end of the decade the Dolfinarium started setting up dependencies abroad. As these dependencies did not have financial success, the Dolfinarium went bankrupt in 1982. At the insistence of the mayor of Harderwijk a new foundation was set up to continue the Dolfinarium and in 1984 the shares of the company were sold to a new owner. In 1987 Gudrun was sent to SeaWorld Orlando. In 1989 the Dolfinarium once again changed hands and the new owner invested money in the building of new attractions. The largest of the constructions was the building of a lagoon in 1997, which cost around 12 million euro.

In 2001 the Dolfinarium was bought by Compagnie des Alpes, which owns another amusement park in the Netherlands, Walibi Holland, and formerly owned Avonturenpark Hellendoorn. In 2005 the park underwent major renovation for the fiftieth anniversary of the park. During the boreal winter of 2012–2013, further renovations, including refurbishment of the old dome, were made. On 17 December 2014 the director of the Dolfinarium said that the ownership of the Dolfinarium would likely pass from Compagnie des Alpes to Aspro Parks, with negotiations being in the final stages.

In 2016 the Dolfinarium announced to decrease the number of dolphins at the park, citing that the population had gotten too large. It also announced a new playground for children. The number of visitors decreased to 586,300 in 2016. In 2018 the Dolfinarium opened a new attraction and turned a profit for the first time in five years.

== Areas ==
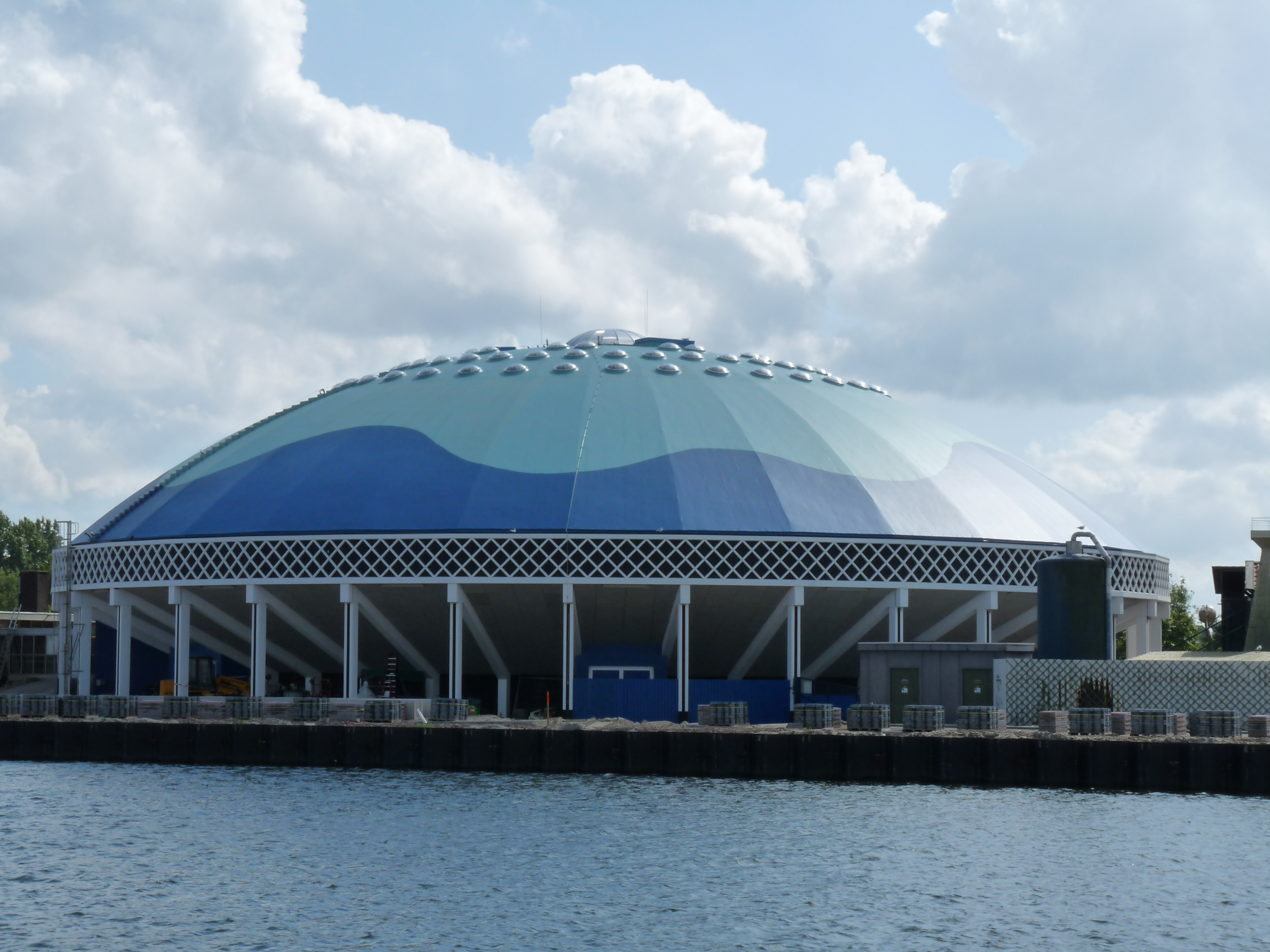
DolfijndoMijn dome of the Dolfinarium Harderwijk as seen from the outside of the park.

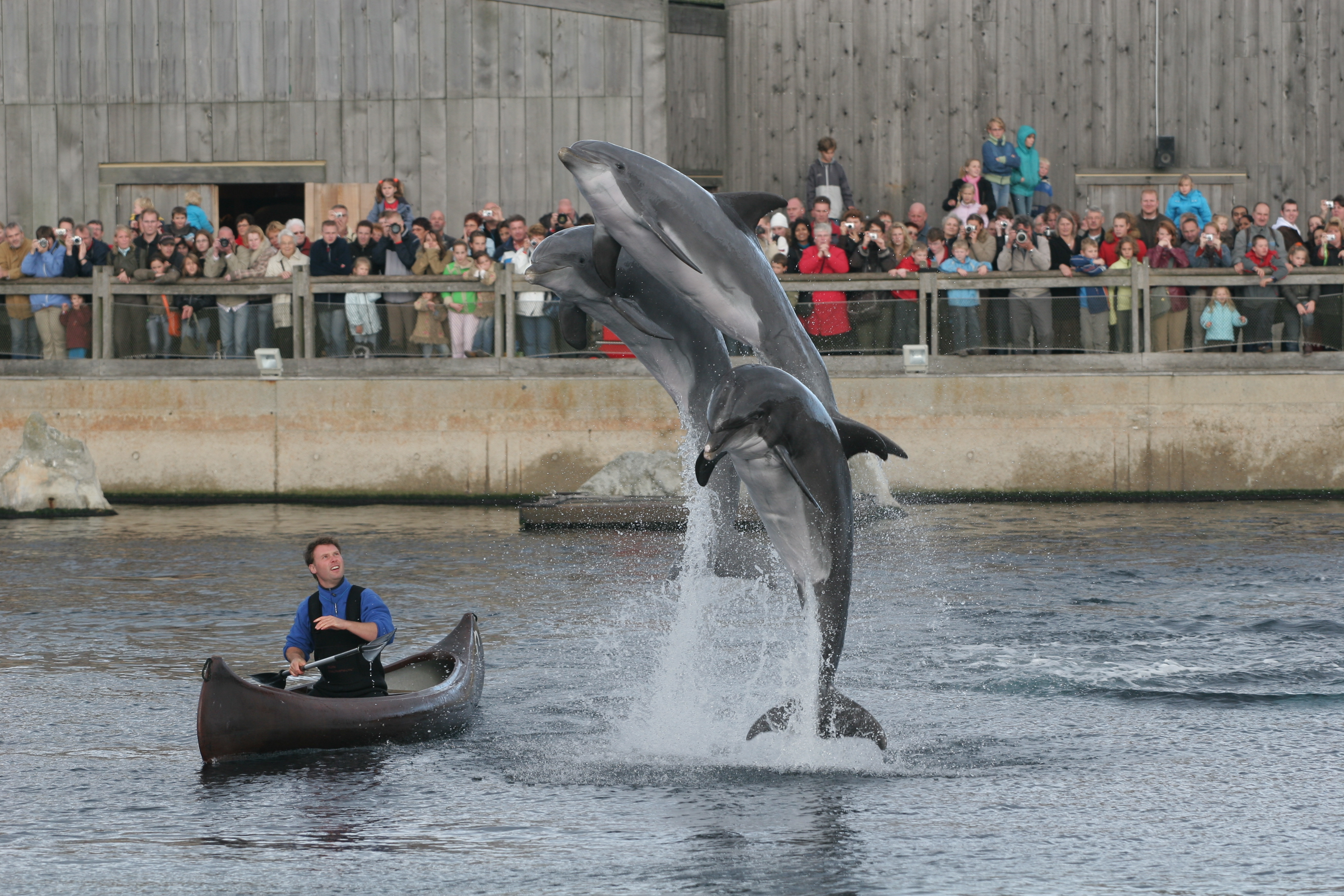
Dolphins at the Dolfijnendelta performing in a show.

The park is open each year from spring to autumn, with winter being reserved for maintenance. The park is divided into several areas for different species or wider groups of animals. The animals in some areas perform in shows.

- Bruinvisbaai: Harbour porpoise
- DolfijndoMijn: Main show area for common bottlenose dolphins. Set in the blue dome, which has a capacity of 2000 people.
- Dolfijnendelta: Formerly known as the lagoon, this is the living area for common bottlenose dolphins, most dolphins live in this area, including the newborns. The area can also be observed from underwater (at the Onderwater Odiezee), which provides a 60 meter long glass wall, with the dolphins often coming close due to their curious nature. The aquarium holds 15 million liters of water.
- Krabbenkust: Crabs, lobsters, sea anemone, fish.
- Roggenrif: Rays, Sharks, European seabass, Thicklip grey mullet, other fish, crabs, lobsters, oysters, lugworms and sea anemone.
- Stoere Stellerstek: Steller sea lion
- Walrussenwal: Walrus, Walrus Igor lived here until he died in 2013.
- Zeeleeuwenzee: California sea lion
- Zeehondenzand: Harbor seal and Grey seal
- Zotte Zeeleeuwentheather: Show area for California sea lions.

The park has numerous restaurants, shops and playgrounds and a beach located on lake Wolderwijd. An in-park hotel is planned.

=== Additional experiences ===
In cooperation with a foundation, the Dolfinarium offers therapeutic sessions with dolphins for children with autism or Down syndrome. Commercially it offers a program called "Sleeping with dolphins" for children aged 8–12.

== SOS Dolfijn ==
SOS Dolfijn is an independent foundation based in the Dolfinarium dedicated to the saving of stranded porpoises, dolphins and whales. Porpoises (85%) are the most common patients at the recovery facilities in the Dolfinarium. The goal of saved animals is to let them recover and then release them into the wild again. If porpoises are deemed unfit to be released into the wild, they are sent to the Bruinvisbaai or to facilities at Ecomare on the island of Texel.

In 2016 the cooperation between SOS Dolfijn and the Dolfinarium stopped, with SOS Dolfijn announcing it was looking for a new location.

== Morgan ==
In 2010 the Dolfinarium attracted worldwide attention when young orca Morgan was found exhausted and emaciated in the North Sea. She was rescued and sent for recovery at the Dolfinarium. After her recuperation opinions were split between those who wanted to return her to nature, and those who saw no chance of Morgan surviving in nature and thus wished her to go Loro Parque, Tenerife, Spain, where she could be better taken care of. The Dolfinarium wished to see Morgan go to the Loro Parque as well. Those who wished to see Morgan return to nature united in the Orca Coalition. Sentiments ran high and in the end a Dutch judge decided that Morgan should be transported to Loro Parque. Morgan was moved to Loro Parque on 29 November 2011. The Dutch police provided an escort from the Dolfinarium to Schiphol Airport. The date of the transport had been kept secret as the city of Harderwijk feared confrontations between opposers of the transport and police. The city had issued an emergency ban on 'Free Morgan' protests. The costs to the Dolfinarium of the rescue, upkeep, and transport of Morgan to Spain were over €1 million.

== Television ==
Dutch broadcaster Nickelodeon aired a show intended for children called Spetter! during 2006. The show was based around the dolphin called Spetter in the Dolfinarium. Spetter was the first dolphin born by artificial insemination in the Dolfinarium. While shooting the series, a plastic model of the dolphin was at times used so as to not exhaust the animal. A subsequent season called Spetter and the Romanov Mystery was aired by Jetix in 2007. Tess Gaerthé, Dutch contestant to the Junior Eurovision Song Contest 2005, provided the titlesong for the second season. Re-runs of the Spetter series have been shown by different RTL channels. The airing of the Spetter series led to a higher number of visitors for the Dolfinarium.
