= American Federation of Aviculture =

National exotic animal organization

American Federation of Aviculture, Inc.
- Founded: 1974
- Type: Educational Organization
- Purpose: Birds, Parrots, Behavior Consultants, Animal Trainers, Conservationists, Veterinarians, Pet Industry, Animal Researchers, Pet Owners, and Breeders
- Location: Austin, Texas, United States
- Region served: United States, Worldwide
- Method: Conferences, Publications
- Key people: Jamie Whittaker, President
- Website: www.afabirds.org

The American Federation of Aviculture, Inc. (AFA) is a national organization dedicated to aviculture, whose purpose is to educate the public and assist members regarding best practices for keeping and living with exotic birds. Local affiliate bird clubs throughout the United States, including Puerto Rico, along with national and international specialty organizations; comprise the Federation. The American Federation of Aviculture is registered as a non-profit 501(c)3 educational organization, with a business office located in Austin, Texas.

AFA members work to promote responsible breeding and care of birds. The volunteer organization provides assistance and resources to all people involved with companion birds including breeders, owners, researchers, vets and rescue organizations. AFA members actively support research projects designed to make life better for parrots in their native habitats.

== History ==
The AFA was formed in 1974 after government officials decided to euthanize flocks of exotic parrots in an effort to eradicate instances of avian diseases. As part of the State of California's effort to curb an outbreak of Exotic Newcastle Disease, the USDA confiscated and euthanized sick birds, along with "thousands of healthy birds", while proposing legislation to ban private ownership of avian pets. The AFA was incorporated in California as the overall entity to represent bird clubs whose members wanted protection for their birds.

The mission and purpose of AFA shall be to promote the advancement of Aviculture through educational programs that support the advancement and improvement of breeding practices, husbandry practices, and living conditions for exotic birds, conservation, research and legislative awareness.

== Members ==
The AFA members are divided into eleven regions, segmented geographically. The areas are:

Region	States
Mid-Eastern Region	Illinois, Indiana, Michigan, Ohio
Mid-Atlantic Region	Delaware, District of Columbia, Maryland, New Jersey, Pennsylvania, Virginia, West Virginia
Northeastern Region	Connecticut, Maine, Massachusetts, New Hampshire, New York (East), New York (West), Rhode Island, Vermont
Southeastern Region	Alabama, Georgia, Kentucky, Mississippi, North Carolina, South Carolina, Tennessee
Florida/Puerto Rico/Virgin Islands Region	Florida (North), Florida (Central), Florida (South), Puerto Rico, Virgin Islands
South Central Region	Arkansas, Louisiana, Oklahoma, Missouri, Texas (North), Texas (South)
North Central Region	Iowa, Kansas, Minnesota, Nebraska, North Dakota, South Dakota, Wisconsin
Northwestern Region	Alaska, Idaho, Montana, Oregon, Washington
Western Region	Arizona (North), Arizona (South), Colorado, Nevada, New Mexico, Utah, Wyoming
Southern California Region	San Diego, Los Angeles, Los Angeles Metro Area
Northern California & Hawaii Region	California (North), Hawaii

== Events ==
The American Federation of Aviculture holds an annual convention in a different region of the United States each year. In 2014, AFA will host its 40th convention in Portland, Oregon. Invited speakers present on a wide range of topics dealing with aviculture. In the past, renowned researchers such as Dr. Donald Brightsmith, Director of the Tambopata Macaw Project/Schubot Exotic Bird Health Center, and Mark Hagen, M.Ag., Research Director for the Hagen Avicultural Research Institute of the Rolf C. Hagen Group, have presented at the conventions.

== Publications ==
The American Federation of Aviculture publishes the AFA Watchbird for members. The Watchbird is a three-time winner of the Printing and Imaging Association of MidAmerica (PIA) Graphics Excellence Award (graphex). The Watchbird awards were for "Best of Category" in color magazine series.

Other publications include, A Portfolio of Endangered Species, Birds in the Classroom.

== Certifications ==
The AFA offers a two-level certification program titled: Fundamentals of Aviculture. Level One "provides a foundation for the emerging science of aviculture. It is presented in nine chapters ranging from anatomy and physiology to avian behavior; from laws and regulations affecting aviculture to how to provide proper housing and prevent illness of birds in our care; and much, much more." Level Two of the certification program "is offered in 15 chapters covering conservation and research, courtship and nesting, basic avian genetics, color mutations, hybrids, breeding stimuli, incubation, hand-rearing, non-parrot studies, basic microbiology, illnesses, first-aid, avian enrichment and more. Admission to this Level II course requires that all students complete Level I prior to enrollment."

== Grants ==
Grants are distributed yearly for research and wild parrot conservation projects. The projects that have received grants from the AFA are:

- The Red-fronted macaw conservation project (Asociacion Armonia, Bolivia)
- Project Abbotti, conservation of the recently rediscovered Abbotti's cockatoo (Indonesian parrot project/ project Birdwatch)
- The Spix's macaw project, captive propagation in Brazil
- Nesting ecology of the Slender-billed conure
- Proventricular dilatation disease research (Schubot Exotic Bird Health Center, Texas A&M University)
- Puerto Rican parrot (PRP) reintroduction
- A joint project with the Loro Parque Foundation in Tenerife, Canary Islands, Spain on artificial nest boxes for the Catey, or Cuban parakeet
- The breeding biology of the Bahama parrot
- The status and conservation of the Cape parrot in southern Africa
- The ecology and breeding biology in the conservation of the Yellow-shouldered Amazon on Margarita, Venezuela
- A preliminary study on the impact of Hurricane Gilbert on the psittacine population of Yucatan
- Macaw conservation in Belize and Honduras in Central America; natural history of the el oro parakeet (Pyrrhura oresi)
- Determination of the status of the Glaucous macaw and Hyacinth macaw in Argentina and Paraguay
- The genetics of the Puerto Rican parrot (Amazona vittata)
- Support for the Centro para la Conservation de los Psitacidos Mexicanos
- First workshop of the management and conservation of macaws in meso-America
- Halfmoon conure breeding consortium
- Tracking of seasonal movements of the great green macaw in the Atlantic rainforest of Costa Rica and Nicaragua

Between 1982 and 1993, the AFA reports "more than 40 separate grants have been awarded" to further "avian research".

== Legislative efforts ==
The AFA Legislative committee, working with members and bird groups around the country, monitors legislation on local, state and federal levels which may adversely impact the breeding and keeping of companion parrots.

== See also ==
- Aviculture
- Companion parrot
- Parrot
