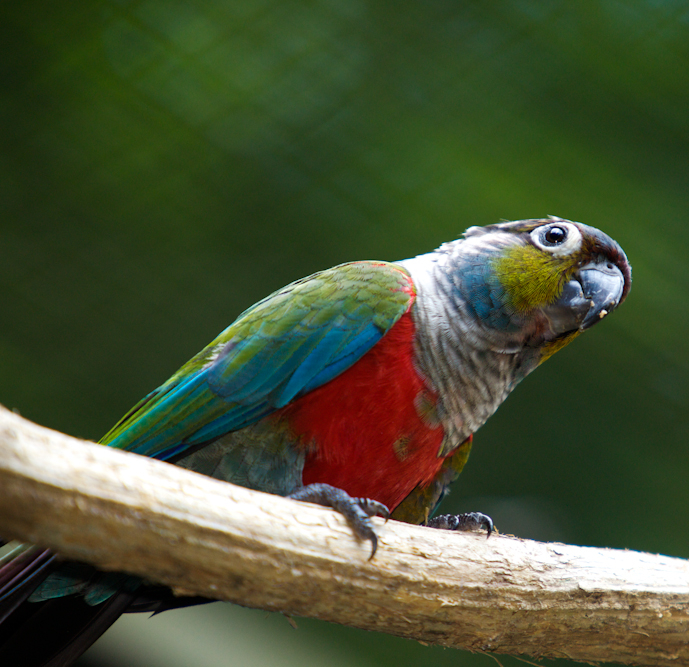

Conservation status
- Least Concern (IUCN 3.1)
- CITES Appendix II

Scientific classification
- Kingdom: Animalia
- Phylum: Chordata
- Class: Aves
- Order: Psittaciformes
- Family: Psittacidae
- Genus: Pyrrhura
- Species: P. perlata

Binomial name
- Pyrrhura perlata (Spix, 1824)

Synonyms
- Pyrrhura rhodogaster

= Crimson-bellied parakeet =

Crimson-bellied conure

Species of bird

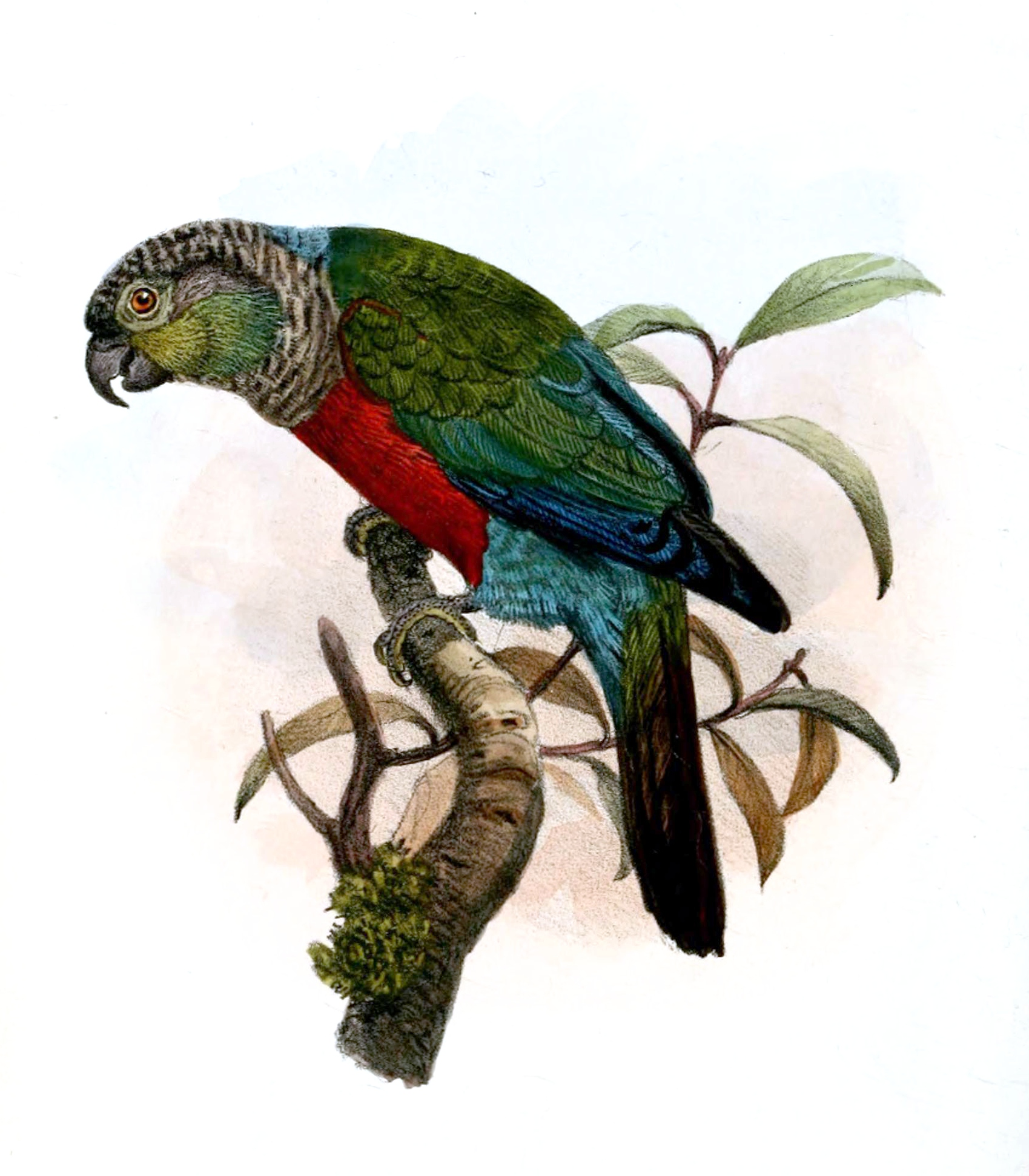
Illustration by Joseph Wolf, 1864

The crimson-bellied parakeet (Pyrrhura perlata), known as the crimson-bellied conure in aviculture, is a species of bird in subfamily Arinae of the family Psittacidae, the African and New World parrots. It is found in Bolivia and Brazil.

== Taxonomy and systematics ==
The crimson-bellied parakeet's taxonomic history is potentially confusing. It has been assigned to several genera since its original description. Since the mid-1800s it was known as Pyrrhura rhodogaster, but following a 1983 review it was discovered that the type specimen for P. perlata, long believed to belong to the closely related pearly parakeet, actually was a juvenile crimson-bellied parakeet. Consequently, P. perlata was transferred to this species, while P. rhodogaster became a junior synonym under the principle of priority.

The crimson-bellied parakeet is monotypic.

== Description ==
The crimson-bellied parakeet is 24 to 25 cm (9.4 to 9.8 in) long and weighs 76 to 91 g (2.7 to 3.2 oz). The sexes are the same. Adults have a dark grayish brown head flecked with pale grayish buff, dark brownish gray ear coverts, a goldish green upper cheeks, and turquoise-blue lower cheeks. Their nape has a narrow blue band. Their upperparts are green with a bluish tinge. Their throat, upper breast, and the sides of their neck are gray to blue with a scaly appearance, and sometimes with pinkish tips to the feathers. The belly and upper flanks are bright red and their lower flanks and vent area are greeish blue. Their wing is mostly green, with black and cobalt blue primaries and red underwing coverts. Their tail's top surface is reddish brown and the lower surface is blackish brown. Their iris is dark brown, their bill blackish, and their legs blackish gray. Immatures are similar to adults but have a mostly green belly.

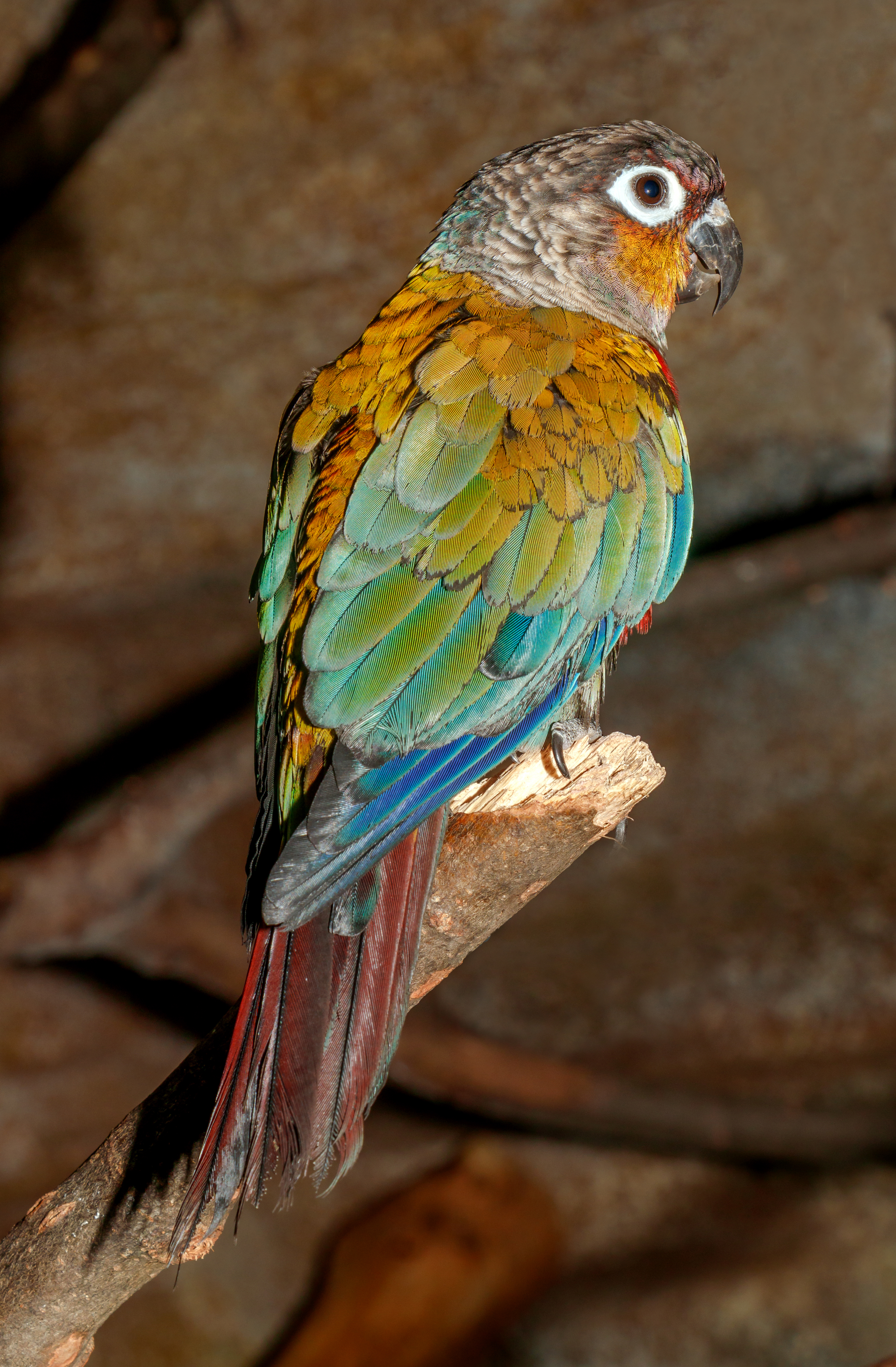

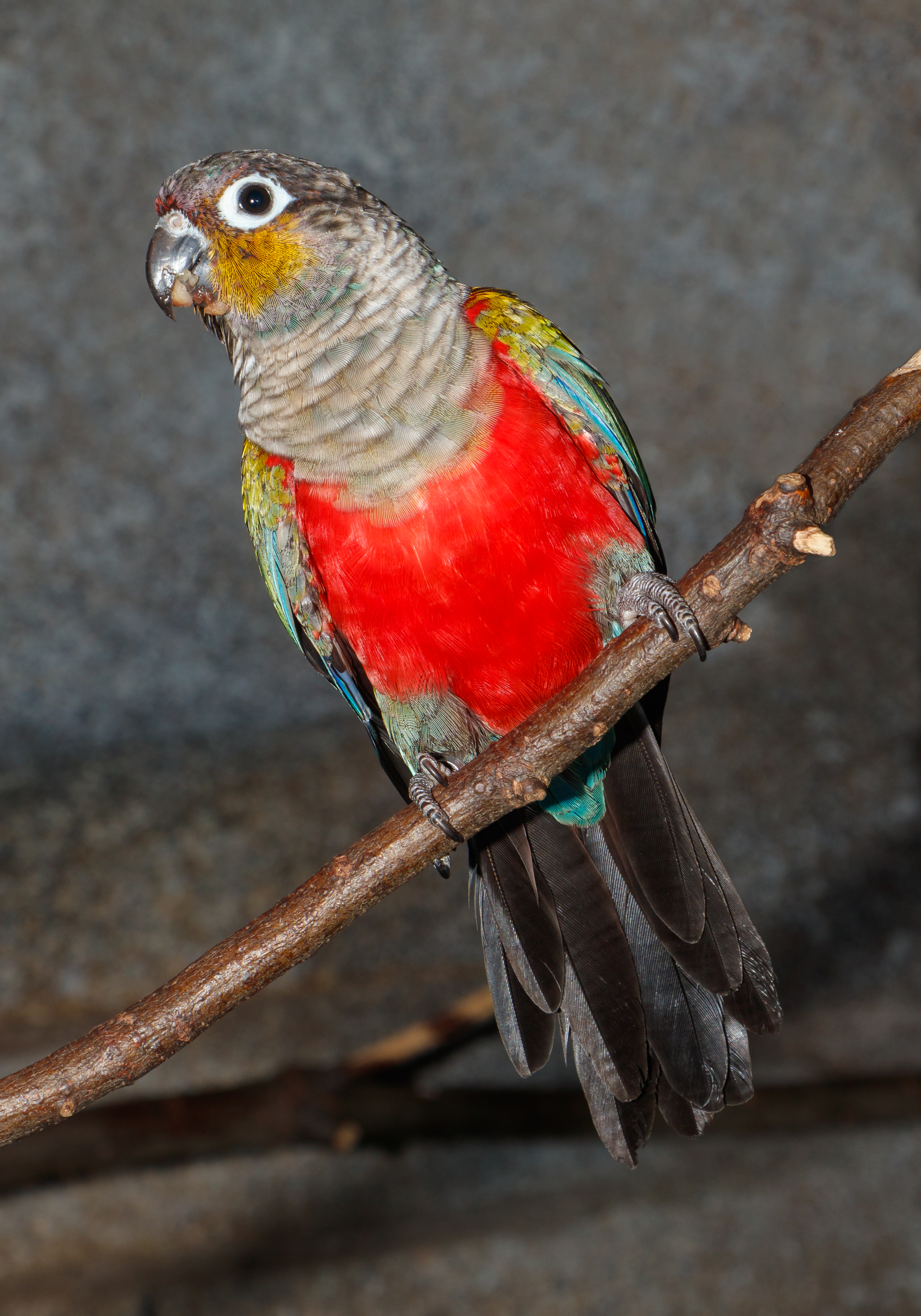

== Distribution and habitat ==
The crimson-bellied parakeet is found in the Amazon Basin from the Mamoré River in northeastern Bolivia east into Brazil south of the Amazon River in the states of Mato Grosso, Rondônia, Amazonas, and Pará. It mostly inhabits the canopy and edges of humid terra firme forest and secondary forest, and also occurs in drier lowland forest. In elevation it ranges as high as 600 m (2,000 ft).

== Behavior ==
=== Movement ===
The crimson-bellied parakeet is non-migratory.

=== Feeding ===
The crimson-bellied parakeet feeds mainly on fruit but also includes flowers in its diet.

=== Breeding ===
The crimson-bellied parakeet breeds between August and November, and possibly from April to June. It is assumed to nest in tree cavities like other Pyrrhura parakeets. Their clutch size is four to six eggs. The incubation period is 25 days and fledging occurs seven to eight weeks after hatch.

=== Vocalization ===
The crimson-bellied parakeet's call is a "high, rapid "wrr'wur-wir-wir-wir"." It also makes "a strange, slightly toy-trumpet-like "peeéh"."

== Status ==
The IUCN originally assessed the crimson-bellied parakeet as being of Least Concern, then in 2012 as Vulnerable, and since 2021 again as of Least Concern. It has a large range but its population size is not known and is believed to be decreasing. "The primary threat to this species is accelerating deforestation in the Amazon basin as land is cleared for cattle ranching and soy production". It is also affected by hunting. It does occur in about 75,000 km^{2} (29,000 sq mi) of protected lands within its range of about 1,430,000 km^{2} (552,000 sq mi).
