= Aviculture =

Practice of keeping and breeding birds

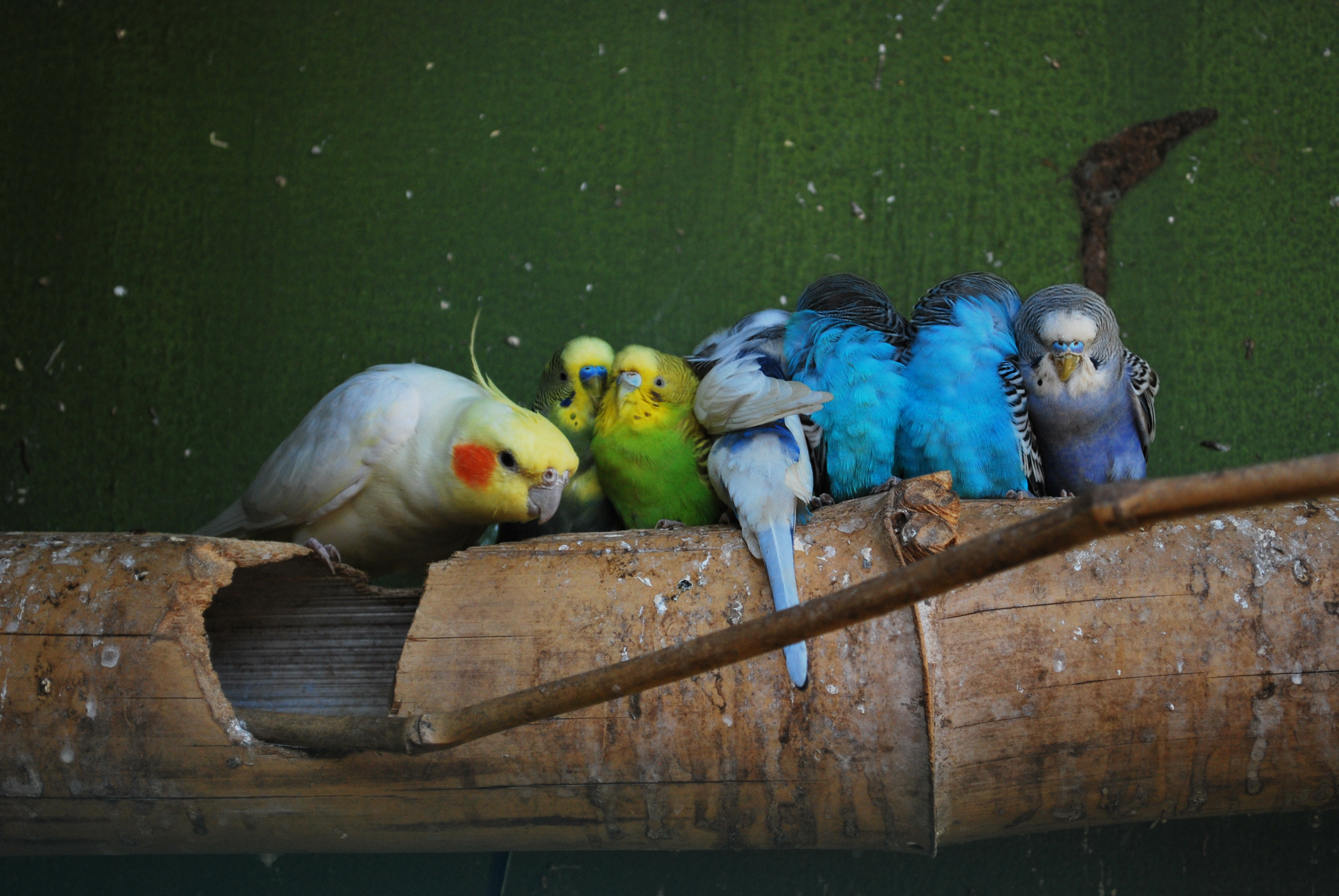
Budgerigars and a cockatiel in captivity

Aviculture is the practice of keeping and breeding birds, especially of wild birds in captivity, and including poultry, in controlled conditions, normally within the confines of a cage or an aviary.

Some reasons for aviculture are: breeding birds as a hobby, a business like a zoo, or sometimes for research and conservation purposes to preserve and protect some endangered avian species that are at risk due to habitat destruction, the illegal wildlife trade, diseases, and natural disasters. Aviculture encourages conservation, provides education about avian species, provides companion birds for the public, and includes research on avian behaviour. Popular birds people like to keep and breed include budgerigars, cockatiels, finches, macaws, domestic canaries, columbidae (pigeons and doves), loriini (lories and lorikeets), cockatoos, conures, and grey parrots.

Raising and breeding birds are not the sole focus of aviculture; the practice also encompasses the conservation of avian habitats, species preservation, and the promotion of public awareness regarding bird welfare and biodiversity. Aviculture can range from keeping birds for companion, commercial or hobby, exhibition and research, to poultry husbandry.

Aviculture has been practiced for thousands of years in human history, with evidence of bird keeping found in ancient civilizations where birds were kept for food, beauty, communication, and symbolism. In the modern context, aviculture has evolved into a multidisciplinary field that intersects with biology, ecology, veterinary science, and conservation management.

Aviculturists may work in private collections, breeding facilities, zoos, sanctuaries, or research institutions, each practicing for different goals such as genetic management, education, or species recovery. Nowadays, aviculture is also a popular hobby, with birdkeeping enthusiasts from all over the world.

A major part of aviculture is its role in bird conservation. Captive breeding programs have helped protect endangered species by maintaining healthy populations in controlled environments. Sometimes, these programs also support the reintroduction of birds into the wild.

Responsible aviculture places strong importance on the welfare of the birds, including proper housing, balanced nutrition, good health care, and opportunities for natural behaviors. As many global issues such as habitat loss, climate change, and illegal wildlife trade continue to threaten bird populations, aviculture remains both useful and controversial. It is viewed as a tool that can support education, research, and conservation when practiced ethically and responsibly.

== Avicultural societies ==
In the UK, the Avicultural Society was formed in 1894 and the Foreign Bird League in 1932. In 1973, Aviornis was created, a bird-breeding association present in several European countries.

The oldest avicultural society in the United States is the Avicultural Society of America, founded in 1927. The ASA produces a bi-monthly magazine, ASA Avicultural Bulletin. The ASA is a 501(c)(3) non-profit organization that focuses on breeding, conservation, restoration and education.

The first avicultural society in Australia was The Avicultural Society of South Australia, founded in 1928. It is now promoted with the name Bird Keeping in Australia. The two major national avicultural societies in the United States are the American Federation of Aviculture and the Avicultural Society of America, founded in 1927. The Budgerigar Society was formed in 1925.

The Avicultural Society of South Australia (founded in 1928) produces a monthly full-colour magazine, Bird Keeping in Australia.

== History ==
The practice of bird keeping can be traced back in time for over 6,000 years ago, There has been a record to indicate that birds have been kept in captivity for poultry, According to H. H. Scullard (as cited in Johnson, Lee R.,1968), Excavations among the Terramare people have revealed that these early inhabitants of peninsula had domesticated the chicken and the duck as early as 1700 B.C.

According to Best and Walker, 2020, There are even older records of pigeons being kept in Mesopotamia as early as 4500 B.C. (as cited it J Archaeol Res, 2025)

Aviculture has been a part of human civilisation for many purposes, civilisations have translocated bird species, both domesticated and non-domesticated, across regions to serve as food, decorative elements, hunting stock, or companions. (Phillip Cassey et al. 2015). so much that "birds have colonised and occupied all major landforms, oceans, and islands of the world" (p. 1) A few species have undergone full domestication, whereas others have been raised in captive environments over through generations.

=== The origins of domestication ===
Domestication of poultry was significantly tied to the development of early agriculture (J Archaeol Res, 2025). In Southeast Asia, the transition from wild birds to domestic chickens occurred between 1650 and 1250 B.C., where dry rice and millet are cultivated across the region, drawing wild red junglefowl into human settlements (Peters et al., 2022). This created a relationship between the species and human, making them grow into a member of human societies. The early avian relationships were not uniform; while some species became fully domestic, others were kept in managed or captive states to fulfil specific cultural and practical roles.

The goose (Anser cygnoides) is likely the first bird species to be kept. Recent genetic and archaeological evidence has indicated that there are breeding taking place outside the current area where geese naturally breed today (Shi et al., 2006).

Another breed that has a long history of relationship with human is pigeon, which descended from rock doves (Columba livia). With many records of self-domesticated near human colonies, then exploited for consumption. The oldest records dated back to the birds being sustainably harvested by Neanderthals (Blasco et al. 2014), Iraq and Assyrian (Zeuner 1963).

Meanwhile Ancient Egyptians kept them for ceremonial offerings, and Greek have statues and vases dated to the 5th century BC depict people holding the birds (Hawes 1984).

In Europe, the medieval period witnessed widespread use of dovecotes, which were a symbol of status as humans began to encourage birds to roost.

=== The global translocation of avian species ===
The global movement of birds can be divided into two main periods. The first period is moved by European Acclimatisation Societies occurring between the 18th and 20th centuries, as the human world was at the age of discovery and colonisation. The movements people also created transportation and trading of many species and introducing species of birds to new colonies as a result. (Crosby Jr, 1972). The movement of human history during the time significantly influenced on biodiversity of nations avaina that “40% of all known bird introductions occurred as a result of activity relating to the British occupation of just four geopolitical regions: Hawaii, New Zealand, Australia, and the continental USA (Blackburn et al., 2009)”

The second period; the era of the international trade in wild birds for bird-keeping from the late-twentieth century to the nowadays. (Cassey et al., 2015).

In this era of international trade typically moves birds in reverse direction from the previous era, often moving from former colonies in South America, Africa, and Southeast Asia toward Europe and North America.

== Challenges ==
Birds exhibit strong sensitivity to changes in environmental conditions, and their responses vary significantly between species due to differences in ecological traits. Ground-nesting and habitat specialists (e.g., larks, bustards) are especially vulnerable. For instance, The Great Bustard ( Otis tarda ), which demands large, intact grassland habitats free from disturbance for lekking and nesting, shows a decrease in population with even moderate increases in human infrastructure and grazing pressure (Rocha et al. 2013; Végvári et al. 2016).

In comparison to some generalist species such as the corvids may initially tolerate or even gain advantage from low-intensity disturbance as a consequence of expanded foraging opportunities in disturbed patches (Han et al. 2025), although continued persistence often obscure broader community degradation. At the community level, steppe bird assemblages have been significantly altered by the increasing of human footprint. Declines in species richness and abundance have consistently been reported by researchers along gradients of disturbance intensity, particularly outwit moderate levels of grazing to habitat conversion (Liang et al. 2019).

Additionally, activities relate to human can expose wildlife to pesticides and other pollutants, placing additional stress on bird populations (Tassin de Montaigu and Goulson 2020; Rigal et al. 2023).

As part of finding solutions to the Asian Songbird Crisis –the recognition that the trade in wild-caught birds is the main threat to the conservation of Asian songbirds-, research conducted by a team led by EcoVerde Global Consulting found that the crested jayshrike is a “master bird”. It is used to train other songbird species that compete in songbird competition, and while it received legal protection in Indonesia in 2018, this has no effect on the trade in the bird markets

=== Human influence ===
Birds that have been kept in captivity and subsequently released into the wild survival chances depend on various factors. Captive breeds, and hand-reared birds that have imprinted on humans typically do not survive. Upon release, they frequently retreat to the cage for security. Several captive birds have permission to free fly, subsequently return for food and protection. Hand-reared birds commonly show reduced breeding success compared to parent-reared birds, so aviculturists handle breeding stock noticeably less than birds intended to be companion animals. Avians that are specially bred to be released into the wild receive different treatment and potentially have little or no human contact, while encouraging to forage by more natural methods.

Private aviculturists have increasing responsibility in the breeding of rare or endangered species to accumulate stocks for return to the wild. Considerate the fact that numerous uncommon or rare birds are plentiful in aviaries, breeding programs have enlisted the support of private aviculturists by several government conservation departments.

=== Behavior changes ===
Changes in antipredator behaviour in captivity have been suggest explaining the higher invasiveness of wild-caught exotic species. An intraspecific comparison between wild-caught and captive-breed's first generation shows an expeditious behavioural decrease in captivity (individual lifetime) rather than to differences among species (evolutionary exposure). Addition to the current of avian invasions, the proportion of individuals exhibiting antipredator responses within a species was positively associated with the likelihood of that species escaping and breeding in the wild.

In contrast to earlier intentional introductions, recent and ongoing avian invasions emerge from the accidental escape of globally traded cage birds. In this hypothetical scenario, Carrete & Tella reported that wild-caught cage bird species are considerably more incline to escaping and becoming invaders rather than captive-bred, regardless of their accessibility on the pet market. The ability to adapt with new environments could have potentiality vanished in species bred in captivity over a long time, simultaneously the high mortality rates during the wild-caught birds international trade have the possibility of select's life-history and physiological traits individuals that influence the positively development of these group of species. As a matter of fact, responses to acute stress differ from wild-caught and captive-bred individuals. Corticosterone (CORT) responses to acute stress last longer in wild-caught individuals, compare to captive-bred birds, both at inter- and intra-specific levels. The prolong response present in wild-caught birds could assist them escape from cages and have greater survival chances when encountering challenges in new environments, perhaps adding to their higher invasiveness.

Numerous birds have been selectively bred for domestication over generations, which produce behavioural changes as a consequence. Therefore, the antipredator behaviour changing of captive-bred birds can be consequence of their detachment from predators as well as founder effects and/or artificial (human) selection. In addition, individual behavioural traits frequently show correlation, including those individuals that display relatively bold behaviour toward predators are prone to be more towards conspecifics, and thus, developing a medium-term loss of antipredatory response at the population level.

=== Invasion control ===
Exotic bird populations are complicate to control once they are established and reinforce the polemic, controversial demand for prohibit the trade of wild-caught birds as a preventive action (see review in). A permanent trade ban (as enforced in Spain by law Real Decreto 630 in 2013) worldwide would be effortless and effective route of controlling current, and preventing future, exotic invasions, while captive breeding can satisfy the social demand for exotic cage birds without risks.

== Types ==
=== Companion bird keeping ===
Avian species are commonly kept in captivity for humans' enjoyment and pleasure.

Companion birds are typically considered as an interactive animal that recognizes the owner, developing a human to animal bonds. The purpose of keeping a companion is to propagate the species, provide companionship, and enjoyment for the owner.

=== Captive breeding programs ===
Despite common assumptions, the breeding of exotic birds in captivity has a potentially negative impact on the species in the wild. Throughout the history the increasing popularity of keeping exotic animals as pet, Wild caught or captive bred, frequently leads to a subsequent increase in the illegal trafficking of their wild counterparts.

Official captive propagation and reintroduction programs are generally pursued only as a final measure, demanding substantial cost and over many decades of effort. To achieve a favorable outcome, most committed captive breeding of endangered wildlife species must be performed deprived of any human contact. From juvenile bird's predator avoidance, foraging, and social interaction are required skills to ensure a good chance of survival in the wild.

=== Conservation programs ===
Avian Conservation programs signify the commitment to safeguarding bird species and their natural environments. Central to ecological stability, it acknowledges the crucial need to maintain biodiversity within ecosystems. This program includes approaches to reduce threats such as habitat degradation, the impacts of climate change, environmental contamination, and guarantees long-term survival of diverse avian populations.

Reliable aviculture for conservation objective advocates the breeding of specific species in captivity with the mission and expectation of introducing them back into the wild.

=== Falconry/Raptor management ===
Falconry is the traditional practice of managing and hunting with trained birds of prey. This is one of the oldest applications of aviculture that have been documented, with the evidence of prehistoric cave paintings depicted falconry work, dated to the 13th century BCE.

Depending on the country, wild birds of prey may be legally trapped by falconers, or obtain birds bred in captivity. After completing in training, multiple falconers will release their peak physical condition birds into the wild with the lifetime ability to hunt prey.

== See also ==
- American Federation of Aviculture
- Companion parrot
