= List of amusement parks in Africa =

The following is a list of amusement parks in Africa.

== Algeria ==
=== Algiers ===
- Expo Center Park

== Botswana ==
- Lion Park

== Egypt ==
- Cairo Land
- Dream Park
- Fantazy Land, Alexandria
- Geroland
- Kooky Park, closed for renovation, Giza
- Magic Land, closed for renovation
- Sindbad City
- Family Park
- Scientific Exploratory City

== Kenya ==
- Luna Park, Nairobi
- Splash Waterworld, Nairobi
- Wild Waters, Mombasa

== Libya ==
- Il Bosco, Benghazi

== Mauritius ==
- Casela World of Adventures

== Morocco ==
=== Casablanca ===
- Crazy Park, Casablanca
- Loupi Park Land
- Magic Forest
- Parc Sindibad, Casablanca
- Coco Park, Meknes

=== Other ===
- Magic Park, Salé
- xTreme Park, Agadir

== Nigeria ==
- Delta Leisure Resort, Warri Delta
- Luxurious Toho Island, Abuja, FCT
- African Heritage City, Abuja, U/C
- Dreamworld Africana, Lagos
- Fun Factory, Lagos
- Hi-Impact Planet, Lagos
- Trans Amusement Park, Ibadan, Oyo
- Wonderland Themepark, Abuja FCT
- Apapa Amusement Park, Lagos

== South Africa ==
=== Gauteng ===
- Emperors Palace, Johannesburg
- Gold Reef City, Johannesburg
- Monte Casino Entertainment Complex, Johannesburg
- Carnival City, Johannesburg

=== KwaZulu-Natal ===
- Mini town - Durban, KwaZulu-Natal
- uShaka Marine World - Durban, KwaZulu-Natal
- WaveHouse - UMhlanga, KwaZulu-Natal

=== Eastern Cape ===
- Wild Waves - Wild Coast Region, Eastern Cape

=== North West ===
- Valley of Waves - Sun City, North West

=== Western Cape ===
- Adventure Land - Plettenberg Bay, Western Cape

== Sudan ==
- Al Mogran Amusement Park, Khartoum

== See also ==
- Lists of amusement parks
- List of water parks in Africa
