= Lists of amusement parks =

Alphabetical list of amusement parks
| A–B: | A, B |
| C–D: | C, D |
| E–H: | E, F, G, H |
| I–M: | I, J, K, L, M |
| N–S: | N, O, P, Q, R, S |
| T–Z: | T, U, V, W, X, Y, Z |

This page provides links to lists of amusement parks by region (below), and alphabetically beginning with the name of the park (right).

== By region ==
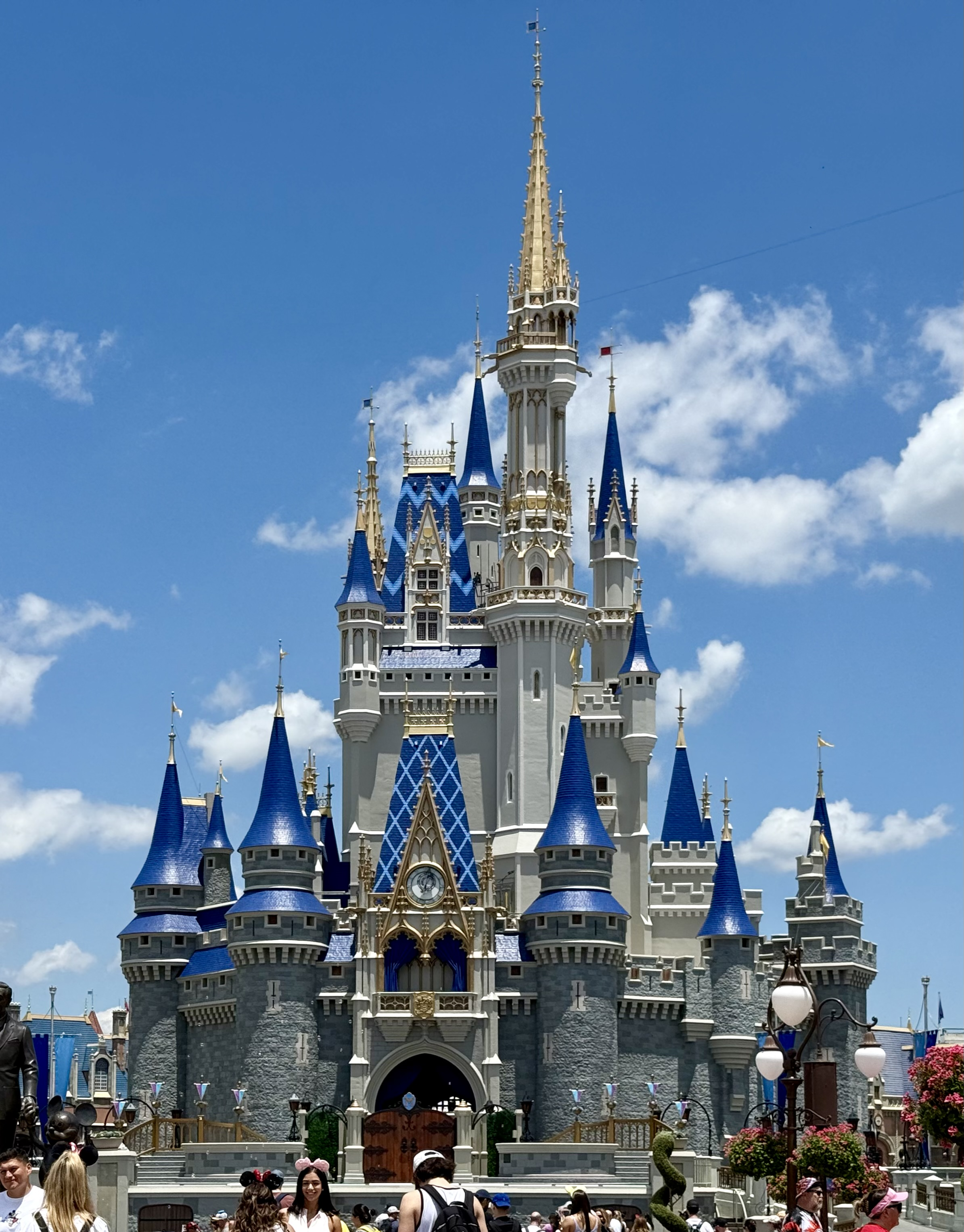
Cinderella Castle at Walt Disney World, the largest amusement park in the world.

Africa

Americas

Asia

Oceania

Europe

== Other ==
- List of amusement park rankings
- List of amusement rides
- List of amusement rides based on film franchises
- List of amusement rides based on television franchises
- List of amusement rides based on video games franchises
- List of amusement parks in Central Florida
- List of amusement parks in North Korea
- List of amusement parks in the United Kingdom
- List of defunct amusement parks
- List of defunct amusement parks in the United States
- List of incidents at independent amusement parks
- List of King Kong amusement park attractions
- List of Wisconsin amusement parks

== See also ==
- Amusement park
- List of closed rides and attractions
- List of roller coaster elements
- List of roller coaster rankings
- List of water parks
  - List of water parks in Africa
  - List of water parks in the Americas
  - List of water parks in Asia
  - List of water parks in Europe
  - List of water parks in Oceania
