= List of amusement parks (I–M) =

Alphabetical list of amusement parks
A–B:	A, B
C–D:	C, D
E–H:	E, F, G, H
I–M:	I, J, K, L, M
N–S:	N, O, P, Q, R, S
T–Z:	T, U, V, W, X, Y, Z

== I ==
- Idlewild and Soak Zone (Ligonier, Pennsylvania, United States)
- IMG Worlds of Adventure (Dubai, United Arab Emirates)
- Indiana Beach (Monticello, Indiana, United States)
- Isla de los Juegos (Moreno, Buenos Aires, Argentina)

== J ==
- Joyland Amusement Park (Lubbock, Texas, United States)
- Joyland Amusement Park (Wichita, Kansas, United States)
- Joypolis (Yokohama, Japan)
- Julianatoren (Apeldoorn, Netherlands)

== K ==
- Kalahari Resorts (Wisconsin Dells, Wisconsin, Sandusky, Ohio, Pocono Manor, Pennsylvania, and Round Rock, Texas)
- Kennywood (West Mifflin, Pennsylvania, United States)
- Kernie's Familiepark (Kalkar, Germany)
- Kiddie Park (San Antonio, Texas, United States)
- Kid's World (Long Branch, New Jersey, United States)
- Kings Dominion (Doswell, Virginia, United States)
- Kings Island (Mason, Ohio, United States)
- Knoebels Amusement Park & Resort (Elysburg, Pennsylvania, United States)
- Knott's Berry Farm (Buena Park, California, United States)
- Knott's Soak City (Buena Park, United States)
- Kolmarden Wildlife Park (Bråviken bay, Sweden)

== L ==
- La Ronde (Île Sainte-Hélène, Montreal, Quebec, Canada)
- Lagoon (Farmington, Utah, United States)
- Lake Compounce (Bristol, Connecticut, United States)
- Lakemont Park (Altoona, Pennsylvania, United States)
- Lakeside Amusement Park (Denver, Colorado, United States)
- Legoland Billund (Billund, Denmark)
- Legoland California (Carlsbad, California, United States)
- Legoland Deutschland (Günzburg, Germany)
- Legoland Dubai (Dubai, United Arab Emirates)
- Legoland Florida (Winter Haven, Florida, United States)
- Legoland Japan (Nagoya, Japan)
- Legoland Malaysia Resort (Johor Bahru, Malaysia)
- Legoland New York (Goshen, New York, United States)
- Legoland Windsor (Windsor, Berkshire, England)
- Leisureland Fair (Hastings, Victoria, Australia)
- Leofoo Village Theme Park (Hsinchu, Taiwan)
- Libertyland (Memphis, Tennessee, United States)
- Lihpao Land (Houli District, Taichung, Taiwan)
- Linnanmäki (Helsinki, Finland)
- Liseberg (Gothenburg, Sweden)
- Lotte World (Seoul, South Korea)
- Loudoun Castle (Galston, East Ayrshire, Scotland) closed 2010
- Luna Park Melbourne (Melbourne, Victoria, Australia)
- Luna Park Sydney (Sydney, New South Wales, Australia)

== M ==
- M&Ds (Motherwell, Lanarkshire, Scotland)
- Magic Mountain (Moncton, New Brunswick, Canada)
- Magic Park (Thessaloniki, Greece)
- Magic Planet (Thiruvananthapuram, India)
- Magic Springs and Crystal Falls (Hot Springs, Arkansas, United States)
- Magic World (Pigeon Forge, Tennessee, United States)
- Marineland (Niagara Falls, Ontario, Canada)
- MGM Grand Adventures (Las Vegas, Nevada, United States)
- Michigan's Adventure (Muskegon County, Michigan, United States)
- Mid America Adventure – (Eureka, Missouri, United States)
- Miracle Strip (Panama City, Florida, United States)
- Moomin World (Naantali, Finland)
- Morey's Piers (Wildwood, New Jersey, United States)
- Movie Park Germany (Bottrop, Germany)
- Movie World (a.k.a. Warner Bros. Movie World) (Brisbane, Queensland, Australia)
- Movieland (Lazise, Italy)
- Mt. Olympus Water & Theme Park (Wisconsin Dells, Wisconsin, United States)
- Mundo Marino (San Clemente del Tuyú, Buenos Aires, Argentina)
- Myrtle Beach Pavilion (Myrtle Beach, South Carolina, United States)
