= List of amusement parks (A–B) =

== A ==
Alphabetical list of amusement parks
A–B:	A, B
C–D:	C, D
E–H:	E, F, G, H
I–M:	I, J, K, L, M
N–S:	N, O, P, Q, R, S
T–Z:	T, U, V, W, X, Y, Z

- Acqua Lokos (Capão da Canoa, Rio Grande do Sul, Brazil)
- Adlabs Imagica (Mumbai, Maharashtra, India)
- Admiral Vrungel (Gelendjik, Krasnodar, Russia)
- Adventure Asia Park (Sentosa, Singapore)
- Adventure City (Anaheim, California, United States)
- Adventure Island (amusement park) (Southend-on-Sea, Essex, England)
- Adventure Island (water park) (Tampa, Florida, United States)
- Adventuredome (Las Vegas, Nevada, United States)
- Adventureland (Addison, Illinois, United States)
- Adventureland (Altoona, Iowa, United States)
- Adventureland (Farmingdale, New York, United States)
- Adventureland (Sharjah, United Arab Emirates)
- Adventureland Amusement Park (North Webster, Indiana, United States)
- Adventure Landing (Jacksonville Beach, Florida, United States)
- Adventure World (Bibra Lake, Western Australia)
- Adventure World (Shirahama, Nishimuro, Japan)
- Aérocity Parc (Aubenas, Rhône-Alpes, France)
- Affen- und Vogelpark (Reichshof Eckenhagen, North Rhine-Westphalia, Germany)
- Ajwa Fun World & Resort (Vadodara, Gujarat, India)
- Ak Botah (Almaty, Almaty, Kazakhstan)
- Al-Hamrah Entertainment Village (Riyadh, Saudi Arabia)
- Al Hokair Land Theme Park (Riyadh, Saudi Arabia)
- Al Mogran Amusement Park (Khartoum, Sudan)
- Al Nasr Leisureland (Dubai, United Arab Emirates)
- Al-Rawdah Sharaco Amusement Park (Riyadh, Saudi Arabia)
- Al-Sawary Mall (Jeddah, Mecca, Saudi Arabia)
- Al-Sha'ab Leisure Park (Salmiya, Kuwait)
- Al-Shallal Theme Park (Jeddah, Mecca, Saudi Arabia)
- Alabama Adventure & Splash Adventure (Bessemer, Alabama, United States)
- Alabama State Fairgrounds (Birmingham, Alabama, United States)
- Aladdin's Kingdom (Doha, Qatar)
- Alice in Wonderland (Christchurch, Dorset, England)
- All Star Adventures (Wichita, Kansas, United States)
- Allou Fun Park (Athens, Attica, Greece)
- Alton Towers (Alton, Staffordshire, England)
- Amanohashidate View Lands (Miyazu, Kyoto, Japan)
- The American Adventure Theme Park (Ilkeston, Derbyshire, England)
- American Adventures (Marietta, Georgia, United States)
- Amsterdam Dungeon (Amsterdam, North Holland, Netherlands)
- Amusement Land (Busan, South Korea)
- Amusementspark Tivoli (Berg en Dal, Gelderland, Netherlands)
- Animax (Lisbon, Portugal)
- Antics Land (Sharjah, United Arab Emirates)
- Appu Ghar (New Delhi, India)
- Aqtau Park (Aktau, Mangystau Region, Kazakhstan)
- Aqua Stadium (Takanawa, Minato, Japan)
- Aquarena Springs (San Marcos, Texas, United States)
- Aquashow Fun Family Park (Quarteira, Algarve, Portugal)
- Aquatica (Orlando, Florida, United States)
- Aquatica (San Antonio, Texas, United States)
- Arakawa Park (Arakawa, Tokyo, Japan)
- Argenpark (Lujan, Buenos Aires, Argentina)
- Arnolds Park (Arnolds Park, Iowa, United States)
- Asahiyama Zoo (Asahikawa, Hokkaido, Japan)
- Astroland (Brooklyn, New York, United States)
- Atami Korakuen Yuenchi Apio (Atami, Shizuoka, Japan)
- Attica Amusements - Athens, Greece
- Attractionmania - Moscow, Russia
- Aussie World (Sunshine Coast, Queensland, Australia)
- Australia Zoo (Sunshine Coast, Queensland, Australia)
- Aventura Center (Buenos Aires, Argentina)
- Aventura Selvagem (Penha, Santa Catarina, Brazil)
- Avonturenpark Hellendoorn (Hellendoorn, Overijssel, Netherlands)
- Aziza Mall (Riyadh, Saudi Arabia)

== B ==
- Bagatelle (Merlimont, Nord-Pas de Calais, France)
- Baishinji Park (Matsuyama, Ehime, Japan)
- Baja Amusements (Ocean City, Maryland, United States)
- Bakken (Klampenborg, Sjaelland, Denmark)
- Bandung Super Mall (Bandung, Jawa Barat, Indonesia)
- Barry Island Pleasure Park (Barry Island, Glamorgan, Wales)
- Barry's Amusements (Portrush, County Antrim, Northern Ireland)
- Bay Beach Amusement Park (Green Bay, Wisconsin, United States)
- Bayern Park (Reisbach, Bavaria, Germany)
- Bayville Amusements (Bayville, New York, United States)
- Beech Bend (Bowling Green, Kentucky, United States)
- Beekse Bergen (Hilvarenbeek, North Brabant, Netherlands)
- Beijing Amusement Park (Beijing, China)
- Beijing Shijingshan Amusement Park (Beijing, China)
- Belantis (Leipzig, Saxony, Germany)
- Bellewaerde Park (Ypres, West Flanders, Belgium)
- Bell's Amusement Park (Tulsa, Oklahoma, United States)
- Belmont Park (San Diego, California, United States)
- Benyland (Sendai, Miyagi, Japan)
- Beoland (Nizhny Novgorod, Nizhni Novgorod, Russia)
- Beto Carrero World (Penha, Santa Catarina, Brazil)
- Big Shot Amusement Park (Linn Creek, Missouri, United States)
- Billing Aquadrome (Northampton, Northamptonshire, England)
- Biwako Tower (Otsu, Shiga, Japan)
- Blackbeard's Cave (Bayville, New Jersey, United States)
- Blackbeard's Family Entertainment Center (Fresno, California, United States)
- Blackgang Chine (Ventnor, Isle of Wight, England)
- Blackpool Pleasure Beach (Blackpool, Lancashire, England)
- Blackthunder theme park (India)
- Blue Diamond Park (New Castle, Delaware, United States)
- Boardwalk and Baseball (Haines City, Florida, United States)
- Boardwalk Fun Park (Grand Prairie, Texas, United States)
- Bobbejaanland (Lichtaart, Antwerp, Belgium)
- BonBon-Land (Holme-Olstrup, Sjaelland, Denmark)
- Boomers! (Dania, Florida, United States)
- Boomers! (Fountain Valley, California, United States)
- Boomers! (Medford, New York, United States)
- Boomers! (Upland, California, United States)
- Boomerang Bay (Santa Clara, California, United States)
- Bosque Mágico (Guadalupe, Nuevo León, Mexico)
- Botton's Pleasure Beach (Skegness, Lincolnshire, England)
- Boudewijn Seapark (Bruges, West Flanders, Belgium)
- Bowcraft Amusement Park (Scotch Plains, New Jersey, United States)
- Boyd Park (Wabash, Indiana, United States)
- Bracalandia (Braga, Braga, Portugal)
- Branson USA (Branson, Missouri, United States)
- Brean Leisure Park (Brean, Somerset, England)
- Bridlington Experience (Bridlington, East Riding of Yorkshire, England)
- Brighton Pier (Brighton, East Sussex, England)
- Burlington Amusement Park (Kensington, Prince Edward Island, Canada)
- Busch Gardens Tampa Bay (Tampa, Florida, United States)
- Busch Gardens Williamsburg (Williamsburg, Virginia, United States)
- Bushkill Park (Easton,

Pennsylvania, United States)
