= List of amusement parks (E–H) =

Alphabetical list of amusement parks
A–B:	A, B
C–D:	C, D
E–H:	E, F, G, H
I–M:	I, J, K, L, M
N–S:	N, O, P, Q, R, S
T–Z:	T, U, V, W, X, Y, Z

== E ==
- Efteling (Kaatsheuvel, Netherlands)
- Eldorado Amusement Park (Weehawken, New Jersey, United States)
- Elitch Gardens (Denver, Colorado, United States)
- Emerald Park (Ashbourne, Meath, Ireland)
- Enchanted Forest (Salem, Oregon, United States)
- Enchanted Kingdom (Santa Rosa, Laguna, Philippines)
- Energylandia (Zator, Poland)
- Enchanted Parks (Federal Way, Washington, United States)
- Escape Theme Park (Pasir Ris, Singapore)
- Essel World (Mumbai, India)
- Europa-Park (Rust, Germany)
- Everland (Yonggin, Gyeonggi, Seoul, South Korea)
- Exhibition Park (Saint John, New Brunswick, Canada) (annual)
- Expoland (Osaka, Japan)

== F ==
- Family Kingdom (Myrtle Beach, South Carolina, United States)
- Fantasilandia (Santiago, Chile)
- Fantasy Island (Ingoldmells, Lincolnshire, England)
- Fantasy Kingdom (Ashulia, Savar, Bangladesh)
- Ferrari Land (Salou, Tarragona, Spain)
- Ferrari World Abu Dhabi (Yas Island, Abu Dhabi, United Arab Emirates)
- Flambards Experience (Helston, Cornwall, United Kingdom)
- Flamingo Land (Kirby Misperton, North Yorkshire, England)
- Foy's Lake Concord, (Bangladesh)
- Fort Fun Abenteuerland (Bestwig, Germany)
- Fraispertuis City (Jeanménil, France)
- Frontier City (Oklahoma City, Oklahoma, United States)
- Frontierland Western Theme Park (Morecambe, Lancashire, England)
- Fuji-Q Highland (Fujiyoshida, Yamanashi, Japan)
- Fun Fair Park (Baton Rouge, Louisiana, United States)
- Fun Mountain (Gatlinburg, Tennessee, United States)
- Fun Spot America (Fayetteville, Georgia, United States)
- Fun Spot America (Kissimmee, Florida, United States)
- Fun Spot America (Orlando, Florida, United States)
- Fun Spot Park (Angola, Indiana, United States)
- Funtown Splashtown USA (Saco, Maine, United States)
- Funtasia Water Park (Patna, India)
- Futuroscope (Poitiers, France)

== G ==
- Galaxyland (Edmonton, Alberta, Canada)
- Gardaland (Peschiera del Garda, Italy)
- Geauga Lake (Aurora, Ohio, United States)
- Genting Highlands (Kuala Lumpur, Malaysia)
- Gilroy Gardens (Gilroy, California, United States)
- Glenwood Caverns Adventure Park (Glenwood Springs, Colorado)
- Gold Reef City (Johannesburg, South Africa)
- Great Escape (Queensbury, New York, United States)
- Green Land Amusement Park (Kumamoto, Japan)
- Gröna Lund (Stockholm, Sweden)

== H ==
- Lake Hamana Palpal (Hamamatsu, Shizuoka, Japan)
- Happyland Tripoli, Libya
- Hamel's Amusement Park (Shreveport, Louisiana, United States)
- Hansa-Park (Sierksdorf, Lübeck, Germany)
- Haw Par Villa (Singapore)
- Heide Park (Soltau, Germany)
- Hersheypark (Hershey, Pennsylvania, United States)
- Himeji Central Park (Himeji, Hyogo, Japan)
- Holiday Park (Habloch, Germany)
- Holiday World & Splashin' Safari (Santa Claus, Indiana, United States)
- Hong Kong Disneyland Resort (Hong Kong, China)
  - Hong Kong Disneyland
- Hopi Hari (Campinas, Brazil)
- Hurricane Bay (Louisville, Kentucky, United States)
