= List of water parks in Africa =

The following is a list of water parks in Africa sorted by region.

== Algeria ==
- Aquapalm, Biskra
- Aquafortland, Algiers
- Aqualand Waterpark, Djerma

== Egypt ==
- 5 Springs Aqua Park, Hurghada
- Akassia Swiss Resort Beach, Marsa Alam
- Akoya Water Park, El Alamein
- Ali Baba Palace, Hurghada
- Amarina Jannah Resort & Aqua Park, Marsa Alam
- Aqua Blu, Sharm el-Sheikh
- Aqua city Taverna, Abu El Matamir
- Aqua Park, Obour (city)
- Charmillion Club Aqua Park, Sharm El Sheikh
- Charmillion Club Resort, Sharm El Sheikh
- Cleo Park, Sharm el-Sheikh
- Coral Sea Water World, Sharm El Sheikh
- El Karma Aqua Beach Resort, Hurghada
- Fantazia Resort, Marsa Alam
- Fun & Sun Managed by Rixos Premium, Sharm El Sheikh
- Hawaii Caesar Dreams Resort Aqua Park, Hurghada
- Hawaii Le Jardin Aqua Park, Hurghada
- Hawaii Paradise Aqua Park Resort, Hurghada
- Jaz Aquamarine, Hurghada
- Jaz Dar El Madina, Marsa Alam
- Jungle Aqua Park, Hurghada
- Laguna Vista Water Park, Sharm El Sheikh
- Makadi Water World, Hurghada
- Marassi Water World, El Alamein
- Parrotel Aqua Park Resort, Sharm El Sheikh
- Parrotel Lagoon Resort, Sharm El Sheikh
- Pickalbatros Aqua Park, Hurghada
- Pickalbatros Aqua Park, Sharm El Sheikh
- Pickalbatros Palace Hotel, Marsa Alam
- Pickalbatros Palace Resort, Sharm El Sheikh
- Pickalbatros Royal Moderna Resort, Sharm El Sheikh
- Pickalbatros Villaggio Resort, Marsa Alam
- Regency Plaza Aqua Park, Sharm El Sheikh
- Sea Beach Aqua Park Resort, Sharm El Sheikh
- Sentido Reef Oasis Aqua Park, Sharm El Sheikh
- Serenity Alma Heights, Hurghada
- Sindbad Aqua Park, Hurghada
- Sunrise Aqua Joy Resort, Hurghada
- Sunrise Garden Beach Resort, Hurghada
- Steigenberger Aqua Magic, Hurghada
- Titanic Beach Spa & Aqua Park, Hurghada
- Titanic Resort & Aqua Park, Hurghada

== Ethiopia ==
- Kuriftu Water Park, Bishoftu

== Democratic Republic of the Congo ==
- Aquasplash, Kinshasa

== Gabon ==
- Tsunami, Libreville

== Kenya ==
- Wild Waters, Mombasa

== Libya ==
- Aqua Park Libya, Tripoli

== Morocco ==
- Tamaris AquaParc, Casablanca
- Oasiria, Marrakesh
- Hotel Aqua Fun, Marrakesh
- Aqua Pirate, Kenitra
- Eden Aquapark, Marrakesh
- Smir AquaPark, M'diq
- Aqualand, Meknes
- Aquaparc Alpamare, Saïdia
- MNAR PARK, Tangier
- Atlas Amadil Beach Aqua Sun, Agadir
- LabrandaTarga Club Aqua Parc, Marrakesh

== Mozambique ==
- Aquapark Maputo, Maputo

== Nigeria ==
- Recreation Garden With Water Park, Atan OTA
- Park Vega, Agbor
- Splash Park World, Kaduna
- Splash World, Ikogosi
- Sunrise WaterPark, Abuja
- Tinapa water park, Calabar
- Water Park Watermania Ibom, Idu

== Tanzania ==
- Kunduchi Wet "N" Wild, Dar es Salaam

== Tunisia ==
- Acqua Palace, Hammam Sousse
- Aqua Park Le Pirate saif, Djerba
- Aquapark Mahdia Beach, Mahdia
- Aquapark Thalassa Sousse, Sousse
- Carthage land les berges du lac, Tunis
- One Resort Aqua Park & Spa, Monastir, Tunisia

== South Africa ==
- Sun City Aqua Park, Pilanesberg
- uShaka Wet 'n Wild, Durban (part of uShaka Marine World)
- Wild Waves Water Park, Port Edward

== See also ==
- List of water parks
- List of amusement parks in Africa
