= List of amusement parks (C–D) =

== C ==
Alphabetical list of amusement parks
A–B:	A, B
C–D:	C, D
E–H:	E, F, G, H
I–M:	I, J, K, L, M
N–S:	N, O, P, Q, R, S
T–Z:	T, U, V, W, X, Y, Z

- Cairo Land (Cairo, Egypt)
- Calaway Park (Calgary, Alberta, Canada)
- California's Great America (Santa Clara, California, United States)
- Camden Park (Huntington, West Virginia, United States)
- Camelot Park (Bogotá, Cundinamarca, Colombia)
- Camelot Theme Park (Chorley, Lancashire, England)
- Canada's Wonderland (Vaughan, Ontario, Canada)
- Canadian National Exhibition (Toronto, Ontario, Canada)
- Canobie Lake Park (Salem, New Hampshire, United States)
- Carolina Adventure World (Winnsboro, South Carolina, United States)
- Carosello Park (Sottomarina, Chioggia, Veneto, Italy)
- Carousel Park Adventure Island (Bridlington, East Riding of Yorkshire, England)
- Carowinds (Charlotte, North Carolina, United States)
- Carolina Harbor (Charlotte, North Carolina, United States)
- Cascade Park (New Castle, Pennsylvania, United States)
- Casino Pier (Seaside Heights, New Jersey, United States)
- Castle Park (Riverside, California, United States)
- Castle Park (Dhahran, Dhahran, Saudi Arabia)
- Castles N' Coasters (Phoenix, Arizona, United States)
- CarthageLand (Yasmine, Hammamet, Tunisia)
- Cavallino Matto (Livorno, Tuscany, Italy)
- Cedar Point (Sandusky, Ohio, United States)
- Cedar Point Shores (Sandusky, Ohio, United States)
- Celebration City (Branson, Missouri, United States)
- Celebration Station (Baton Rouge, Louisiana, United States)
- Celebration Station (Clearwater, Florida, United States)
- Celebration Station (Greensboro, North Carolina, United States)
- Celebration Station (Mesquite, Texas, United States)
- Celebration Station (Tulsa, Oklahoma, United States)
- Centreville Amusement Park (Toronto, Ontario, Canada)
- CentrO.Park (Oberhausen, North Rhine-Westphalia, Germany)
- Chakazoolu Indoor Theme Park (Sanabis, Bahrain)
- Chariots Entertainment World (Johannesburg, Gauteng, South Africa)
- Charleston's Wonder World (Charleston, South Carolina, United States)
- Chengdu Amusement Park (Chengdu, Sichuan, China)
- Cherokee Fun Park (Cherokee, North Carolina, United States)
- Cherry Valley Golf & Games (Rockford, Illinois, United States)
- Chessington World of Adventures (Chessington, London, England)
- Chiaksan Dreamland (Wonju-si, Gangwon-do, South Korea)
- Chiba Zoo Dream World (Chiba, Chiba, Japan)
- Chicolandia (Barquisimeto, Lara, Venezuela)
- Children's Grand Park, Seoul (Songdong-Gu, Seoul, South Korea)
- Chime Long Paradise (Guangzhou, Guangdong, China
- Chippewa Park (Thunder Bay, Ontario, Canada)
- Chongqing Amusement Park (Chongqing, China)
- Churpfalzpark (Loifling, Bavaria, Germany)
- Cidade da Criança (São Bernardo do Campo, São Paulo state, Brazil)
- Cigoland (Kintzheim, Alsace, France)
- Cirque du Soleil Theme Park Resort, (Nuevo Vallarta, Mexico)
- City of Miami PBA (Miami, Florida, United States)
- City Park Carousel Gardens (New Orleans, Louisiana, United States)
- Clacton Pier (Clacton-on-sea, Essex, England)
- Clarence Pier (Portsmouth, Hampshire, England)
- Clementon Amusement Park (Clementon, New Jersey, United States)
- Cliff's Amusement Park (Albuquerque, New Mexico, United States)
- Cobra Adventure Park (Panama City Beach, Florida, United States)
- Codona's Amusement Park (Aberdeen, Scotland)
- Colombian National Coffee Park (Montenegro, Quindío, Colombia)
- Como Town (St. Paul, Minnesota, United States)
- Coney Beach Pleasure Park (Porthcawl, Mid Glamorgan, Wales)
- Coney Island (Cincinnati, Ohio, United States)
- Coney Island - Independent Vendor 1 (Brooklyn, New York, United States)
- Coney Island - Independent Vendor 2 (Brooklyn, New York, United States)
- Coney Island - Kaufman - East (Brooklyn, New York, United States)
- Coney Island - Kaufman - West (Brooklyn, New York, United States)
- Coney Park (Lima, Peru)
- Conneaut Lake Park (Conneaut Lake, Pennsylvania, United States)
- Cosmo Land (Yokohama, Japan)
- Cosmo's World (Kuala Lumpur, Malaysia)
- Country Fair Entertainment Park (Medford, New York, United States)
- Crab Island (Beijing, China)
- Craig Tara Holiday Park (Ayr, Strathclyde, Scotland)
- Crown Cave (Guilin, Guangxi, China)
- Cultus Lake Adventure Park (Chilliwack, British Columbia, Canada)
- Cypress Gardens (Winter Haven, Florida, United States)

== D ==
- Daminghu (Jinan, Shandong, China)
- Dazzeland (Adelaide, South Australia, Australia)
- DelGrosso's Amusement Park (Tipton, Pennsylvania, United States)
- Della Adventure Park (Kunegaon, Lonavala, India)
- Dennlys Parc (Dennebrœucq, Nord-Pas de Calais, France)
- Deno's Wonder Wheel Amusement Park (Brooklyn, New York, United States)
- Devon Cliffs (Exmouth, Devon, England)
- Didiland (Morsbronn-les-Bains, Alsace, France)
- Dinorex (Arlington Heights, Illinois, United States)
- Dinorex (Crystal Lake, Illinois, United States)
- Dinotropolis (Caracas, Distrito Federal, Venezuela)
- DippieDoe Familiepark (Eindhoven, North Brabant, Netherlands)
- Discovery World (Houli Hsiang, Taichung, Taiwan)
- Discovery Cove (Orlando, Florida, United States)
- Disneyland Resort (Anaheim, California, United States)
  - Disneyland
  - Disney California Adventure
- Disneyland Paris (Marne-la-Vallée, Île-de-France, France)
  - Disneyland Park
  - Disney Adventure World
- Diverland (Pampatar, Nueva Esparta, Venezuela)
- Divertido (Mexico City, Distrito Federal, Mexico)
- Divertilandia (Barquisimeto, Lara, Venezuela)
- Divo Ostrov, St Petersburg
- Dixie Landin' and Blue Bayou (Baton Rouge, Louisiana, United States)
- Djurs Sommerland (Nimtofte, Jylland, Denmark)
- Dollywood (Pigeon Forge, Tennessee, United States)
- Dollywood's Splash Country (Pigeon Forge, Tennessee, United States)
- Don Quijote (Roppongi, Minato, Tokyo, Japan)
- Dongfang Amusement Park (Guangzhou, Guangdong, China)
- Donghu Park (Shenzhen, Guangdong, China)
- Doocoland (Yongin-si, Gyeonggi-do, South Korea)
- Dorney Park & Wildwater Kingdom (Allentown, Pennsylvania, United States)
- Dover Lake Waterpark (Sagamore Hills, Ohio, United States)
- Dowdy's (Nags Head, North Carolina, United States)
- Downunderland (Canberra, Australian Capital Territory, Australia)
- Dracula's Cabaret (Broadbeach Waters, Queensland, Australia)
- Dragon Centre (Hong Kong, Hong Kong, China)
- Dragon World (Kathmandu, Nepal)
- Drayton Manor Theme Park (Drayton Bassett, Staffordshire, England)
- Dream Park (Cairo, Egypt)
- Dream World, Bangkok, Thailand)
- Dreamland (Koriyama, Fukushima, Japan)
- Dreamland (Margate, Kent, England)
- Dreamland (Seoul, South Korea)
- Dreamworld (Coomera, Queensland, Australia)
- DreamWorks Water Park (East Rutherford, New Jersey, United States)
- Drievliet Family Park (Rijswijk, South Holland, Netherlands)
- Drouwenerzand Attractiepark (Drouwen, Drenthe, Netherlands)
- Duinrell (Wassenaar, South Holland, Netherlands)
- Dunes Leisure (Mablethorpe, Lincolnshire, England)
- Dunia Fantasi (Jakarta, Indonesia)
- Dutch Wonderland (Lancaster, Pennsylvania, United States)
