= List of amusement parks (T–Z) =

Alphabetical list of amusement parks
A–B:	A, B
C–D:	C, D
E–H:	E, F, G, H
I–M:	I, J, K, L, M
N–S:	N, O, P, Q, R, S
T–Z:	T, U, V, W, X, Y, Z

== T ==
- Terra Mítica (Benidorm, Spain)
- Thorpe Park (Chertsey, Surrey, England)
- Tianmen Mountain (Zhangjiajie, Hunan, China)
- Tianzishan (Zhangjiajie, Hunan, China)
- Tinkertown (Winnipeg, Manitoba, Canada)
- Tivoli Gardens (Copenhagen, Denmark)
- Tobu Zoo (Saitama, Japan)
- Tokyo Disney Resort (Urayasu, Chiba, Japan)
  - Tokyo Disneyland
  - Tokyo DisneySea
- Tokyo Dome City (Tokyo, Japan)
- Toverland (Sevenum, Netherlands)
- Tweetsie Railroad (Boone, North Carolina, United States)
- Tykkimäki (Kouvola, Finland)

== U ==
- Universal Orlando Resort (Orlando, Florida, United States)
  - Universal Studios Florida
  - Universal Islands of Adventure
  - Universal Volcano Bay
  - Universal Epic Universe
- Universal Studios Hollywood (Los Angeles, California, United States)
- Universal Studios Japan (Osaka, Japan)
- Universal Studios Singapore (Sentosa Island, Singapore)
- Universal Beijing Resort (Beijing, China)
  - Universal Studios Beijing
- Universal Kids Resort (Frisco, Texas, United States)
- Upper Clements Park (Nova Scotia)

== V ==
- De Valkenier (Valkenburg, Limburg, Netherlands)
- Valleyfair (Shakopee, Minnesota, United States)
- Veegaland (Kochi, Kerala, India)

== W ==
- Waldameer & Water World (Erie, Pennsylvania, United States)
- Walibi Belgium (Wavre, Belgium)
- Walibi Holland (Biddinghuizen, Netherlands)
- Walygator Parc (Maizieres-Les-Metz, Lorraine, France)
- Walt Disney World (Lake Buena Vista, Florida, United States)
  - Magic Kingdom
  - Epcot
  - Disney's Hollywood Studios
  - Disney's Animal Kingdom
  - Disney's Blizzard Beach
  - Disney's Typhoon Lagoon
- Water Kingdom (Mumbai, India)
- Water Country USA (Williamsburg, Virginia, United States)
- Watermouth Castle (North Devon, England, United Kingdom)
- West Edmonton Mall (Edmonton, Alberta, Canada)
- Wet 'n Wild (Orlando, Florida and Greensboro, North Carolina, United States)
- White Water Branson (Branson, Missouri, United States)
- White Water World (Gold Coast, Queensland, Australia)
- Wicksteed Park (Kettering, Northamptonshire, England)
- Wild Adventures (Valdosta, Georgia, United States)
- Wild Rivers Waterpark (Irvine, California, United States)
- Wild Waves Theme Park (Federal Way, Washington, United States)
- Wild Wild Wet (Pasir Ris, Singapore)
- Wobbies World (Nunawading, Victoria, Australia)
- World Waterpark (Edmonton, Alberta, Canada)
- Worlds of Fun (Kansas City, Missouri, United States)
- Wonderla (Bangalore, Karnataka, India)
- Wonderland Amusement Park (Amarillo, Texas, United States)
- Worlds of Wonder Amusement Park (Noida, Uttar Pradesh, India)

== Y ==
- Yas Waterworld (Yas Island, United Arab Emirates)
- Yokohama Cosmo World (Yokohama, Japan)
- Yomiuriland (Tokyo, Japan)

== Z ==
- Zoom Flume (East Durham, New York)
- Zhangjiajie National Forest Park (Zhangjiajie, Hunan, China)
