= Kshamenk =

Male orca

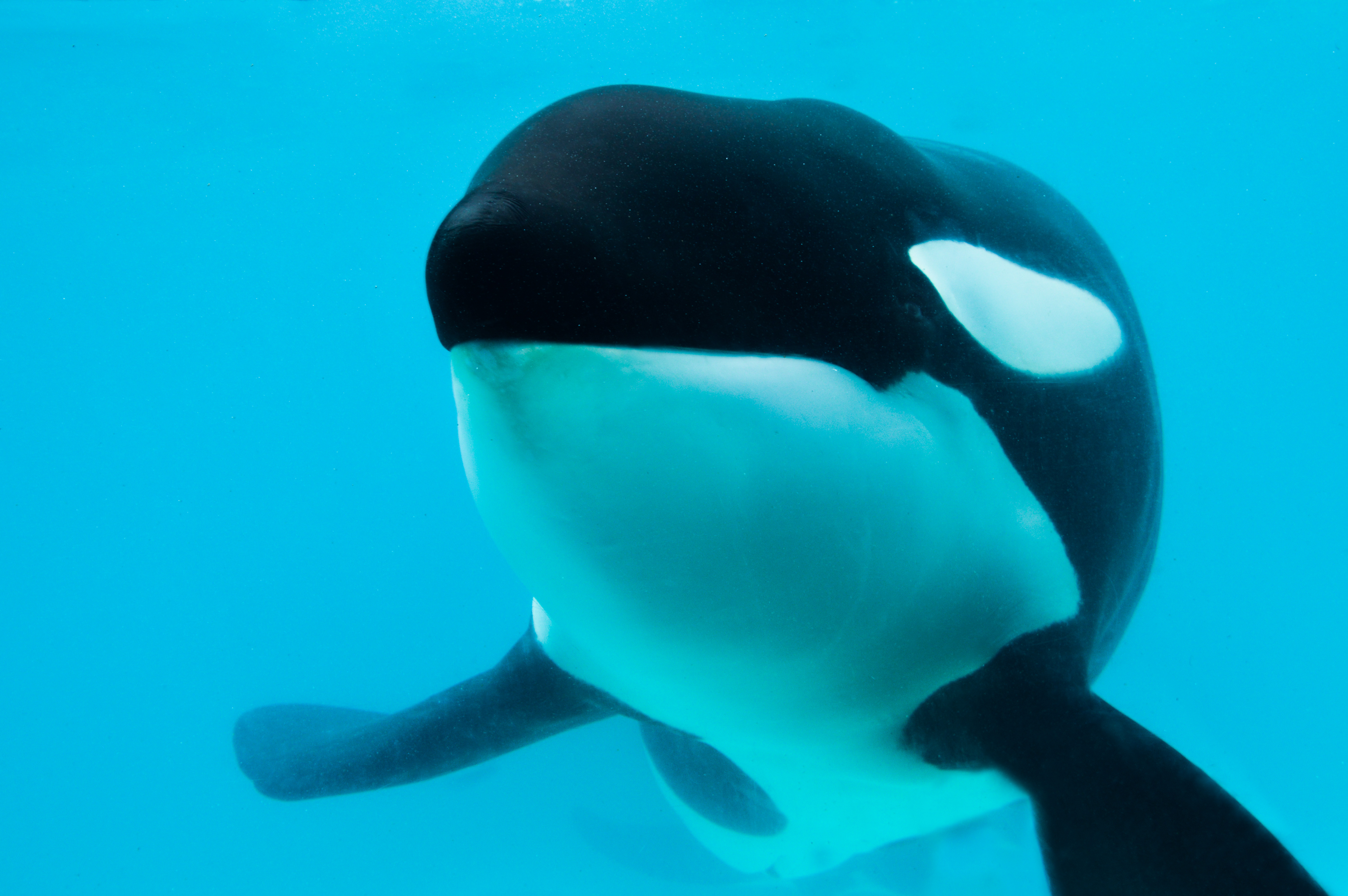
- Species: Orca
- Sex: Male
- Born: 1992
- Died: December 14, 2025 (aged 32–33); Mundo Marino aquarium, San Clemente del Tuyú, Argentina
- Cause of death: Cardiorespiratory arrest
- Known for: Conditions of captivity

Kshamenk (pronounced shah-MENK; 1992 – December 14, 2025) was a male orca (Orcinus orca) rescued after a stranding that occurred in Buenos Aires Province, Argentina. He remained in isolated captivity for more than 33 years until his death, from cardiorespiratory arrest, in December 2025.

== Rescue and rehabilitation ==
Kshamenk was found stranded in November 1992 in Samborombón Bay, near the Ría de Ajó, when he was a calf. The animal was in critical condition after becoming isolated from his family group due to a low tide. Following the rescue, multiple attempts were made to reintroduce him into the natural environment; however, these efforts were unsuccessful due to his physical weakness and the inherent social complexity of the species.

Mundo Marino’s version of what happened is, however, disputed by animal protection organizations. They believe that Kshamenk was forced ashore by people with an interest in circumventing Argentine laws against the commercial capture of wild marine mammals.

Under these circumstances, and following technical evaluations, Kshamenk was transferred to the facilities of the Mundo Marino aquarium, in the town of San Clemente del Tuyú, to receive intensive veterinary care and continuous monitoring.

Orcas are highly social animals that live in complex family structures, known as pods, and whose survival depends largely on group cooperation for hunting and the cultural transmission of behaviors. Various specialists indicated that the reintroduction of an isolated individual, without active social bonds and with a prolonged history under human care, entails significant risks to survival.

In this context, technical reports prepared by scientific associations and international universities (University of Hawaii at Manoa, Bielefeld University, and the European Association for Aquatic Mammals) advised against his release, arguing that documented attempts to reintroduce orcas kept under human care had, in most monitored cases, produced negative outcomes for the animal’s welfare.

== Life under human care ==
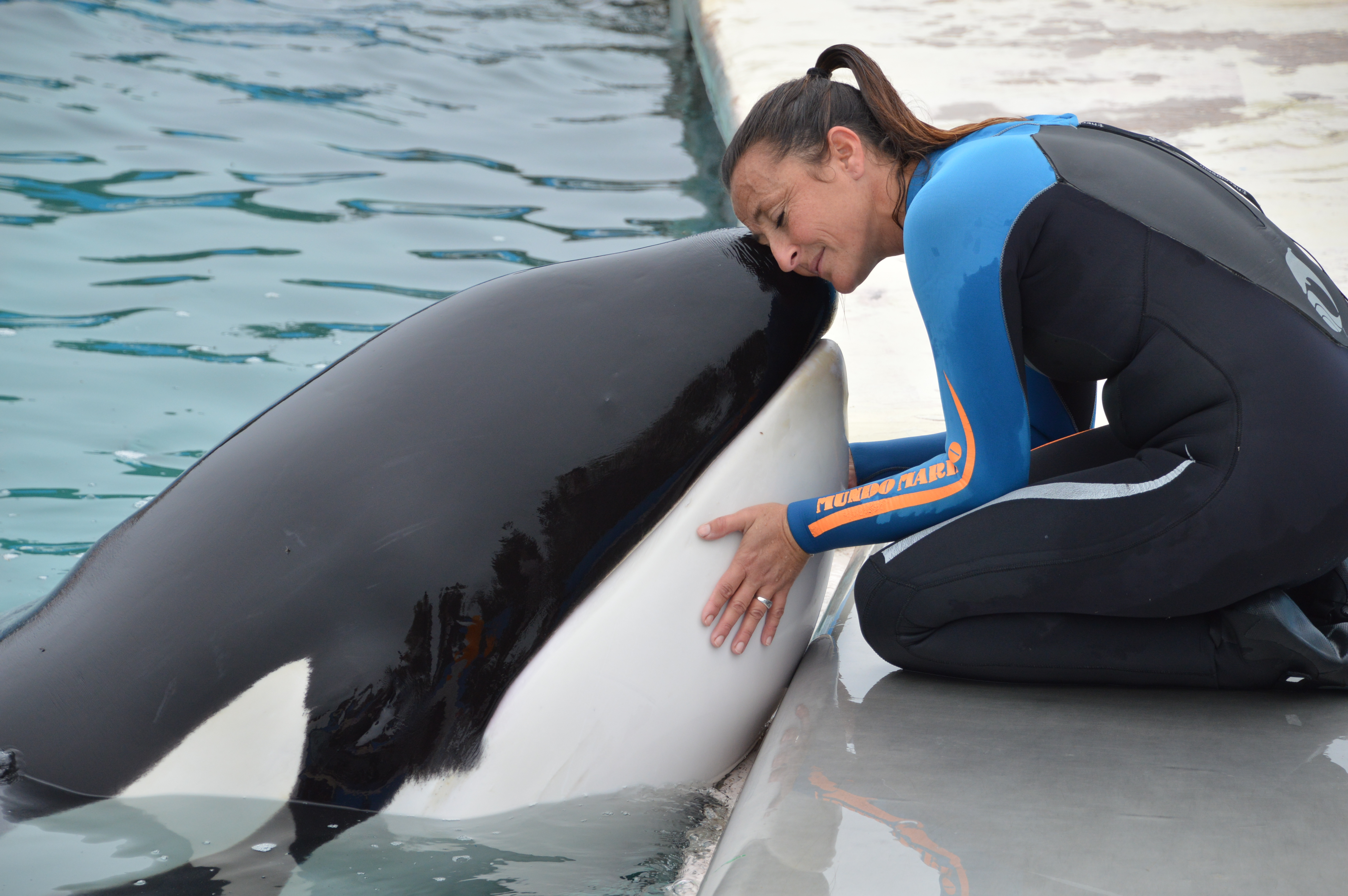
Kshamenk with his caretaker

During his time at Mundo Marino, Kshamenk was cared for by a team composed of animal caretakers and veterinary professionals. According to institutional and journalistic reports, the animal participated in management and behavioral stimulation routines adapted to his species, which included medical training exercises, environmental enrichment activities, and regular clinical monitoring.

Environmental enrichment programs for cetaceans under human care typically include cognitive, feeding, and social stimuli aimed at promoting physical health and behavioral welfare. In Kshamenk’s case, these programs were adjusted over time according to his age and health condition.

Health monitoring included periodic check-ups such as blood analyses, behavioral evaluations, and specialized veterinary examinations. These activities were carried out under the supervision of the competent Argentine authorities on wildlife and animal health, which periodically inspected the facility.

In 2006, a veterinary evaluation conducted by specialists Joseph R. Geraci, David Huff, and Lance Barrett-Lennard concluded that Kshamenk was not suitable for reintroduction into the wild. The technical report described the animal as one of the orcas under human care with the best sanitary and behavioral condition, noting that his status was consistent with a veterinary medicine and management program aligned with international standards.

== Death ==
Kshamenk died on December 14, 2025, at the Mundo Marino facilities in San Clemente del Tuyú. According to the institution responsible for his care, the death was caused by cardiorespiratory arrest.

At the time of his death, the animal was under permanent veterinary monitoring and presented a general condition considered consistent with what is expected for an individual of advanced age. Following his death, the initiation of the corresponding analyses was announced in order to determine more precisely the circumstances and origin of the event, in accordance with standard protocols applicable to wildlife under human care.

Fundación Mundo Marino indicated that the information gathered would be evaluated by specialized professionals and by the competent authorities, in compliance with current regulations on animal health and wildlife conservation.

== Controversies ==
Over the years, Kshamenk’s situation was the subject of public debate and campaigns advocating for his release or transfer to a marine sanctuary. Various organizations and activists argued that the animal should be removed from human care, while the responsible institution and different specialists maintained that any decision should be based on veterinary, biological, and animal welfare criteria.

Among the arguments against his release, it was emphasized that Kshamenk had been rescued as a calf, had not developed autonomous survival behaviors in the wild, and lacked social bonds with a wild pod—factors considered decisive in reintroduction assessments.

These arguments were supported, among other precedents, by the case of the orca Keiko, known for his role in the film Free Willy. Keiko underwent a prolonged and costly rehabilitation and reintroduction process during the 1990s, which failed to achieve stable integration into wild populations and resulted in a high dependence on human care until his death in 2003. This case has been cited by specialists in marine biology and veterinary medicine as an example of the limitations and risks associated with releasing orcas that have spent long periods under human care.
