= List of amusement parks (N–S) =

Alphabetical list of amusement parks
A–B:	A, B
C–D:	C, D
E–H:	E, F, G, H
I–M:	I, J, K, L, M
N–S:	N, O, P, Q, R, S
T–Z:	T, U, V, W, X, Y, Z

== N ==
- Nagashima Spa Land (Mie Prefecture, Japan)
- Nara Dreamland (Nara, Japan)
- Nasu Highland (Nasu, Japan)
- Niagara Amusement Park & Splash World (Grand Island, New York, United States)
- Nickelodeon Universe (Bloomington, Minnesota and East Rutherford, New Jersey, United States)
- Noah's Ark Waterpark (Wisconsin Dells, Wisconsin, United States)

== O ==
- Oaks Amusement Park (Portland, Oregon, United States)
- Oakwood Theme Park (Narberth, Pembrokeshire, Wales)
- Ocean Park Hong Kong (Hong Kong, China)
- Oceans of Fun (Kansas City, Missouri, United States)
- Old Town (Orlando, Florida, United States)
- Ontario Place (Toronto, Canada)
- Opryland USA (Nashville, Tennessee, United States)
- Otherworld (Dalin, Chiayi, Taiwan)

== P ==
- Pacific Park (Santa Monica, California, United States)
- Paragon Park (Hull, Massachusetts, United States)
- Parc Astérix (near Paris, France)
- Parque de Atracciones de Madrid (Madrid, Spain)
- Phantasialand (Brühl, North Rhine-Westphalia, Germany)
- Palace Playland (Old Orchard Beach, Maine, United States)
- Playcenter (São Paulo, Brazil)
- Playland (Rye, New York, United States)
- Playland (Vancouver, Canada)
- Pleasure Beach Blackpool (Lancashire, England)
- Pleasure Island Family Theme Park (Cleethorpes, United Kingdom)
- Pleasureland Southport (Southport, England)
- Plopsa Coo (Coo, Stavelot, Belgium)
- Plopsa Indoor Hasselt Hasselt, Belgium)
- Plopsaland (Adinkerke, Belgium)
- PortAventura Caribe Aquatic Park (Salou, Catalonia, Spain)
- PortAventura Park (Salou, Catalonia, Spain)
- PowerPark (Alahärmä, Finland)

== Q ==
- Quassy Amusement Park (Middlebury, Connecticut, United States)

== R ==
- Raging Waters (Sacramento, California, United States)
- Raging Waters (San Dimas, California, United States)
- Raging Waters (San Jose, California, United States)
- Rainbow's End (Auckland, New Zealand)
- Ratanga Junction (Cape Town, South Africa)
- Republica de los Niños (La Plata, Buenos Aires, Argentina)
- Riverside Amusement Park (Indianapolis, United States)
- Rusutsu Resort (Rusutsu, Hokkaidō, Japan)

== S ==
- San Diego Zoo (San Diego, California, United States)
- San Diego Zoo Safari Park (Escondido, California, United States)
- Sandy Lake Amusement Park (Carrollton, Texas, United States)
- Sanrio Harmonyland (Hiji, Ōita, Kyūshū)
- Sanrio Puroland (Tama New Town, Tokyo, Japan)
- Santa Park (Rovaniemi, Finland)
- Santa's Land (Cherokee, North Carolina, United States)
- Santa's Village (Bracebridge, Ontario, Canada)
- Santa's Village (Jefferson, New Hampshire, United States)
- Santa's Workshop (Wilmington, New York, United States)
- Särkänniemi (Tampere, Finland)
- Schlitterbahn (New Braunfels, Texas, South Padre Island, Texas, Galveston, Texas and Kansas City, Kansas, United States)
- Sea World (Gold Coast, Queensland, Australia)
- Seabreeze Amusement Park (Irondequoit, New York, United States)
- SeaWorld Abu Dhabi (Abu Dhabi, United Arab Emirates)
- SeaWorld Orlando (Orlando, Florida, United States)
- SeaWorld San Antonio (San Antonio, Texas, United States)
- SeaWorld San Diego (San Diego, California, United States)
- Seoul Land (Gwacheon, Gyeonggi, Seoul, South Korea)
- Sesame Place Philadelphia (Langhorne, Pennsylvania, United States)
- Sesame Place San Diego (Chula Vista, California, United States)
- Shanghai Disneyland (Pudong, Shanghai, China)
- Silver Dollar City (Branson, Missouri, United States)
- Silverwood Theme Park (Athol, Idaho, United States)
- Six Flags America (Largo, Maryland, United States)
- Six Flags AstroWorld (Houston, Texas, United States)
- Six Flags Atlantis (Hollywood, Florida, United States)
- Six Flags Autoworld (Flint, Michigan, United States)
- Six Flags Darien Lake (Darien, New York, United States)
- Six Flags Discovery Kingdom (Vallejo, California, United States)
- Six Flags Fiesta Texas (San Antonio, Texas, United States)
- Six Flags Great Adventure (Jackson, New Jersey, United States)
- Six Flags Great America (Gurnee, Illinois, United States)
- Six Flags Hurricane Harbor (Austell, Georgia; Springfield, Massachusetts, United States)
- Six Flags Hurricane Harbor Arlington (Arlington, Texas)
- Six Flags Hurricane Harbor Chicago (Gurnee, Illinois, United States)
- Six Flags Hurricane Harbor Concord (Concord, California, United States)
- Six Flags Hurricane Harbor Darien Lake (Darien, New York, United States)
- Six Flags Hurricane Harbor Los Angeles (Valencia, California)
- Six Flags Hurricane Harbor New Jersey (Jackson Township, New Jersey)
- Six Flags Hurricane Harbor Oklahoma City (Oklahoma City, Oklahoma, United States)
- Six Flags Hurricane Harbor Phoenix (Phoenix, Arizona, United States)
- Six Flags Hurricane Harbor Rockford (Rockford, Illinois, United States)
- Six Flags Hurricane Harbor SplashTown (Spring, Texas, United States)
- Six Flags Magic Mountain (Valencia, California, United States)
- Six Flags México (Tlalpan, Mexico City, Mexico)
- Six Flags New England (Agawam, Massachusetts, United States)
- Six Flags New Orleans (New Orleans, Louisiana, United States)
- Six Flags Over Georgia (Austell, Georgia, United States)
- Six Flags Over Texas (Arlington, Texas, United States)
- Six Flags White Water (Marietta, Georgia, United States)
- Six Flags Wild Safari (Jackson, New Jersey, United States)
- Six Gun City (Jefferson, New Hampshire, United States)
- Slagharen (Slagharen, Netherlands)
- Soak City (Mason, Ohio, United States)
- Soak City (Doswell, Virginia, United States)
- Splendid China (Citrus Ridge, Florida, United States; defunct)
- Splash Works (Vaughan, Ontario, Canada)
- Steel Pier (Atlantic City, New Jersey, United States)
- The Strat (Las Vegas, Nevada, United States)
- Story Land (Bartlett, New Hampshire, United States)
- Storyland (Renfrew, Ontario, Canada)
- Sunway Lagoon (Kuala Lumpur, Malaysia)
- Suoi Tien Amusement Park (Ho Chi Minh City, Vietnam)
- Superior Shores (Shakopee, Minnesota, United States)
