= List of Wisconsin amusement parks =

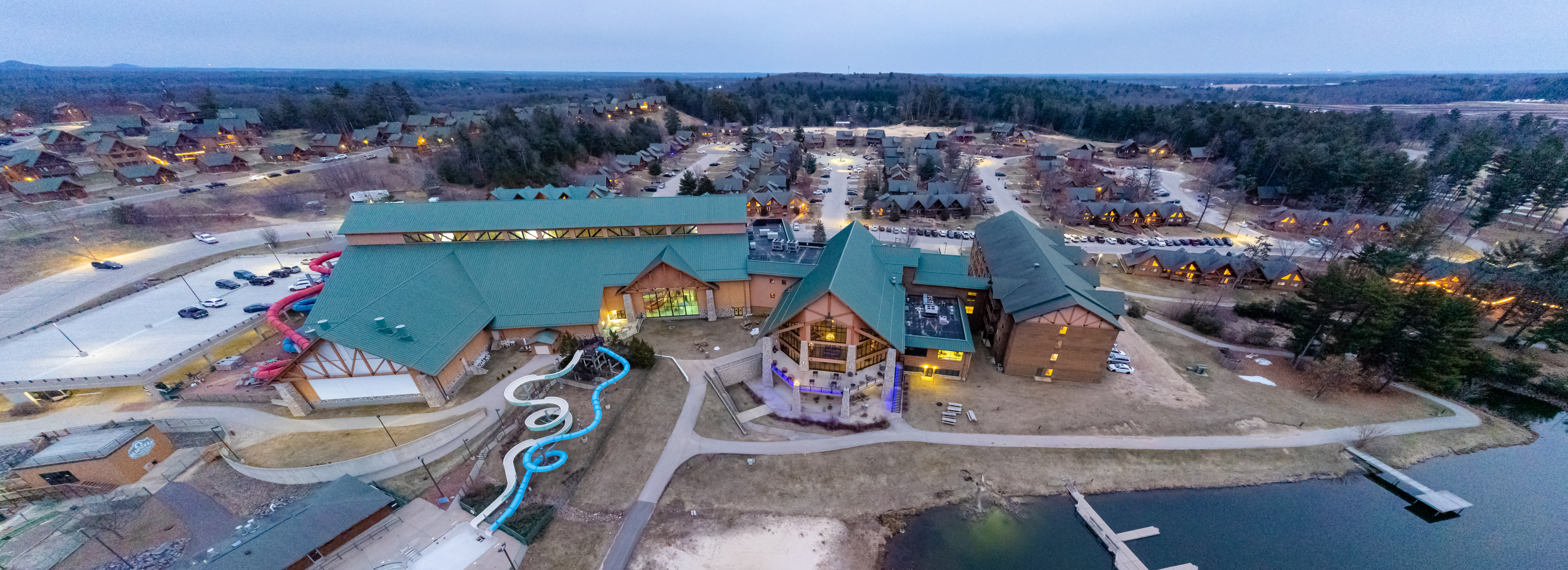
Three Bears Lodge in Warrens, Wisconsin Part of Yogi Bear's Jellystone Park Camp-Resorts

This is a list of amusement parks, water parks, and major festival parks in Wisconsin.

List of Wisconsin amusement and entertainment parks
Park name	Location
Action City (indoor amusement park)	Eau Claire
America's Action Territory (indoor/outdoor amusement park)	Kenosha
Bay Beach Amusement Park (outdoor amusement park)	Green Bay
Breaker Bay Blue Harbor Resort (indoor water park)	Sheboygan
Bristol Renaissance Faire (theme park)	Kenosha
Chula Vista Resort (indoor water park)	Wisconsin Dells
Cool Waters in Greenfield Park (outdoor water park)	West Allis
Deer Valley Lodge (indoor water park)	Barneveld
Egg Harbor Fun Park (outdoor amusement park)	Egg Harbor
Elmer's Fun Park (outdoor amusement park)	St. Germain
Fondy Sports Park (outdoor amusement park)	Fond du Lac
Grand Geneva (indoor water park)	Lake Geneva
Great Wolf Lodge (indoor water park)	Baraboo
Hayward Amusement Center (outdoor amusement park)	Hayward
Henry Maier Festival Park (festival park)	Milwaukee
Jellystone Park (outdoor water park)	Baraboo
Kalahari Resort (indoor water park)	Wisconsin Dells
Knuckleheads (indoor amusement park)	Wisconsin Dells
The Land of Natura (outdoor water and theme park)	Wisconsin Dells
Little Amerricka (outdoor amusement park)	Marshall
Marshfield Fairgrounds Park (festival park)	Marshfield
Monkey Joe's (indoor amusement park)	Appleton
Monkey Joe's (indoor amusement park)	Kenosha
Mt. Olympus Water and Theme Park (indoor/outdoor water and amusement park)	Wisconsin Dells
Noah's Ark (indoor/outdoor water park)	Wisconsin Dells
Northern Wisconsin State Fairgrounds	Chippewa Falls
Polynesian Water Park Resort (indoor/outdoor water park)	Wisconsin Dells
Prairieville Park (outdoor amusement park)	Waukesha
Quarry Beach Adventure Park (outdoor water park)	Sheboygan
Riverside Amusement Park (outdoor amusement park)	La Crosse
Sawmill Adventure Park (indoor amusement park)	Rothschild
Shawano Sports Park (outdoor amusement park)	Shawano
Three Bears Resort (indoor water park)	Warrens
The Springs (indoor water park)	Pewaukee
Timber Falls Adventure Park (outdoor amusement park)	Wisconsin Dells
Wilderness Resort (indoor/outdoor water park)	Wisconsin Dells
Wisconsin State Fair Park (festival park)	West Allis
