= Mundo Marino =

Educational Park Mundo Marino
- Interactive map of Educational Park Mundo Marino
- 36.3401°S 56.74696°W
- Date opened: January 6, 1979; 47 years ago
- Location: San Clemente del Tuyú, Argentina
- No. of animals: 9,000
- Website: mundomarino.com.ar

Mundo Marino (Spanish: Sea World) is the largest aquarium in Argentina. It is located in San Clemente del Tuyú, Argentina.

== History ==
Juan David Méndez sold his properties in Buenos Aires in the 1960s, and moved to San Clemente del Tuyú. He visited the United States in 1962, and was impressed by the quality of their oceanariums. Back in San Clemente, he bought 18 hectares of land, to work with the sick animals that got stranded in the beaches. Those animals were healed, and then returned to the sea when regained their full health. The aquarium was built next to a crab land, at the San Clemente stream. Mundo Marino had its first dolphin in 1977, and was first open for the public in the 1977/78 summer season. Nowadays, Mundo Marino has 20 pools, more than 50 sea mammals, more than 80 birds, and several fishes and other coastal animals.

== Attractions ==
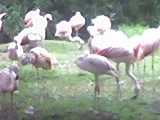
Flamingos at Mundo Marino

- Show de Orca: The trainers of Kshamenk the killer whale demonstrate how he can understand and communicate with games, rewards and mimicry.

He is kept in a tiny tank which has been his home for years.

- Bahía de Lobos: Buy fish and feed the sea lions and learn about their lives and habitats.
- Show de Lobos Marinos: Enjoy the “Hotel Cinco Estrellas” comedy show where sea lions, elephant seals and other marine life attend to the guests at this imaginary hotel.
- Anfiteatro del Lago: Pirate Island is a new show in which news of a shipwreck with a hidden treasure excites the residents of Puerto Cayman who embark on a treasure hunt competing against the pirate ship led by Captain Barracuda.
- Imagen Show: Enjoy the multi vision Legacy of Nature on the 18 meter screen and learn about the scientific research, care and feeding of the marine wildlife at Mundo Marino.
- Estadio del Mar: Dolphins compete among themselves to amuse and thrill the spectators.
- Teatro Sorpresa: "Los Canta cuentos de Pinguy y Orky," Pinguy and Orky and their friends Albatross, Medusa and a messenger dove present children's stories, songs and dances.
- Encuentro Submarino: View the dolphins through a huge window port.
- Tren de Paseo: Take the "La Tronchita" train through the park.
- Lago Paraíso: View numerous birds, fish and flowers in this natural lake and waterfall area.
- Albergue de Pingüinos: This penguin shelter houses Emperor penguins who came ashore to die but were rescued, cleaned and rehabilitated. Guides explain the efforts of the Centro de Rescate y Rehabilitación Provincial.

== Mundo Marino's orca ==
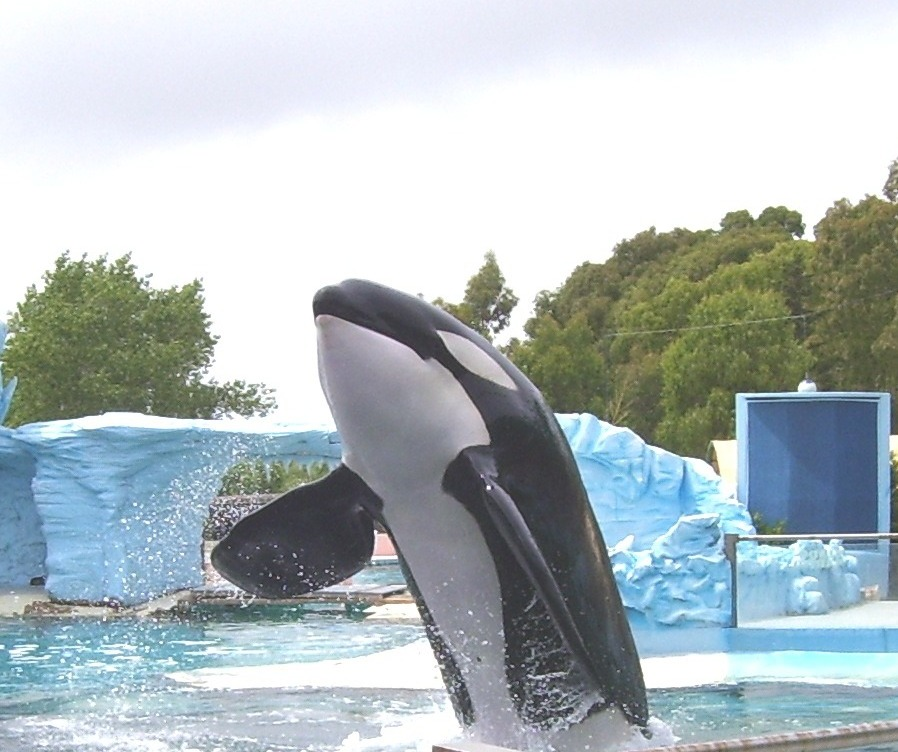
Shamenk the Orca

Kshamenk, also known as Sharmenk or Shamenk, was a male orca, or killer whale, held at Mundo Marino. Kshamenk was estimated to have been around 4 years old when captured in 1992. He was without the company of other orcas from 2000, when Mundo Marino's female killer whale, Belén (also known as Bethlehem), died.

Mundo Marino claimed to have rescued him after he stranded, and kept him for public display when its staff determined he could not be released. However, Kshamenk may have been force-stranded (driven ashore on purpose) and retained to circumvent Argentine laws against the commercial capture of wild marine mammals.

Six Flags Marine World park in Vallejo, California, had been trying to acquire Kshamenk from Mundo Marino as a companion for their female orca, Shouka (she now lives at SeaWorld California). But Mundo Marino does not own Kshamenk; he was legally held in trust by Mundo Marino for the people of Argentina. This means that Mundo Marino could not sell Kshamenk because the orca wasn't its property. Furthermore, Argentine Law forbids the export of live native wildlife, including orcas.

On February 14, 2013, Kshamenk became a father for the very first time when Kasatka, a killer whale from SeaWorld San Diego, gave birth to a healthy baby boy named Makani. On December 6, 2013, Kshamenk became a father again when Kasatka's daughter Takara, an orca from SeaWorld San Antonio gave birth to a healthy baby girl named Kamea. Both calves were conceived through artificial insemination.

On December 14, 2025, World Animal News announced that, after more than 30 years held in captivity, Kshamenk had died that morning.
