= Hi-Impact Planet =

Amusement park in Ogun State, Nigeria

Hi Impact Planet
- Interactive map of Hi Impact Planet
- Location: Ogun State, Nigeria
- Coordinates: 6.728187°N 3.419469°E,
- Opened: December 18, 2015
- Owner: Solution Media and Infotech Limited (100% Nigerian-owned)
- Operating season: Year-round
- Area: 18.5 ha (46 acres)
- Website: https://hi-impactplanet.com

Hi Impact Planet (also known as the Hi Impact Amusement park) is an amusement, theme park and resort on the outskirts of Lagos but located in Ogun State along the Lagos–Ibadan Expressway It opened to the public in December, 2015.

== Attractions ==
Attractions in the park include indoor and outdoor as well as wet and dry facilities such as jump around bumper cars, bumber boats; parachute flyer, slide, Convoy; Kite flyer 12; Haunted House; King of the Jungle; the Jungle; Vertical Swing and Spring ride, Big Buck Panorama, Aliens Armageddon; Transformers Deluxe; Packman Smash; Combat Pump It up Fiesta, a surfing simulated freestyler, hoopla, Mexican fiesta, Samba balloon, dream machine, watermania, Rio train, Boeing 777 outperforming ride, ice rink, animatronics, including semi-live lions, gorillas. Enterprise ride, souvenir court, eye-combat games, 40-metre high spring ride, ferry spin, Mexican theatre, a 10-seater Hi-Impact airplane. The park occupies an area of about 18.5 ha (46 acres). Other facilities in the park includes a clinic, banking services, luxurious hotel, food courts, and a multi-purpose hall of about 7000 capacity and sanitary amenities, 5-D cartoon animation studio, imax cinema.
