= List of King Kong amusement park attractions =

There are multiple amusement park attractions themed to King Kong:

- King Kong 360 currently at Universal Studios Hollywood
- King Kong Encounter previously at Universal Studios Hollywood
- Kongfrontation previously at Universal Studios Florida
- KONG currently at Morey's Piers
- Skull Island: Reign of Kong currently at Universal Islands of Adventure
