= UShaka Marine World =

Aquarium theme park in Durban, South Africa

uShaka Marine World

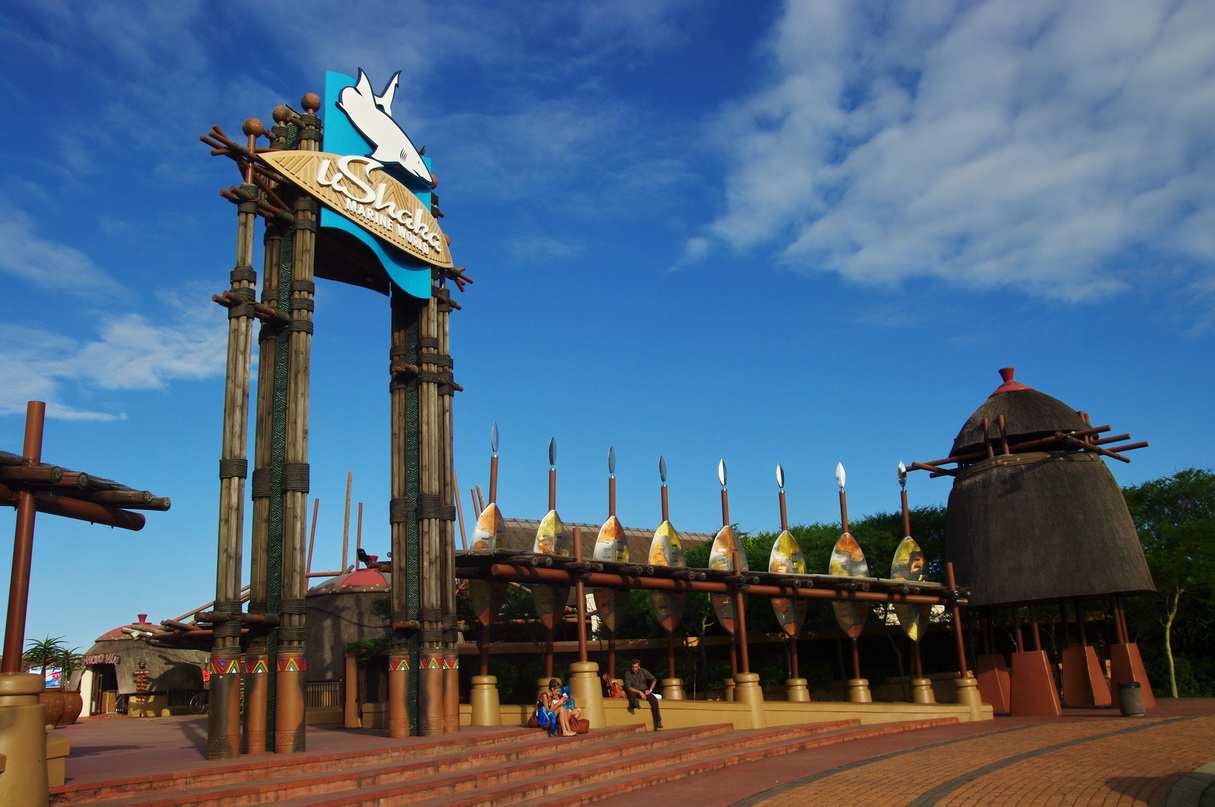
- uShaka Marine World entrance
- Interactive map of uShaka Marine World
- 29.867443°S 31.045915°E
- Date opened: 30 April 2004
- Location: Durban, KwaZulu-Natal, South Africa
- Land area: 16 hectares (40 acres)
- No. of animals: 10,000 (2010)
- Total volume of tanks: 4.6 million US gallons (17,000 m^{3})
- Annual visitors: 790,433 (2010)
- Website: ushakamarineworld.co.za

uShaka Marine World is a 16-hectare (40-acre) theme park that opened on 30 April 2004 in Durban, KwaZulu-Natal, South Africa. It has a total capacity of 4.6 million gallons containing 10,000 animal species.

== History ==
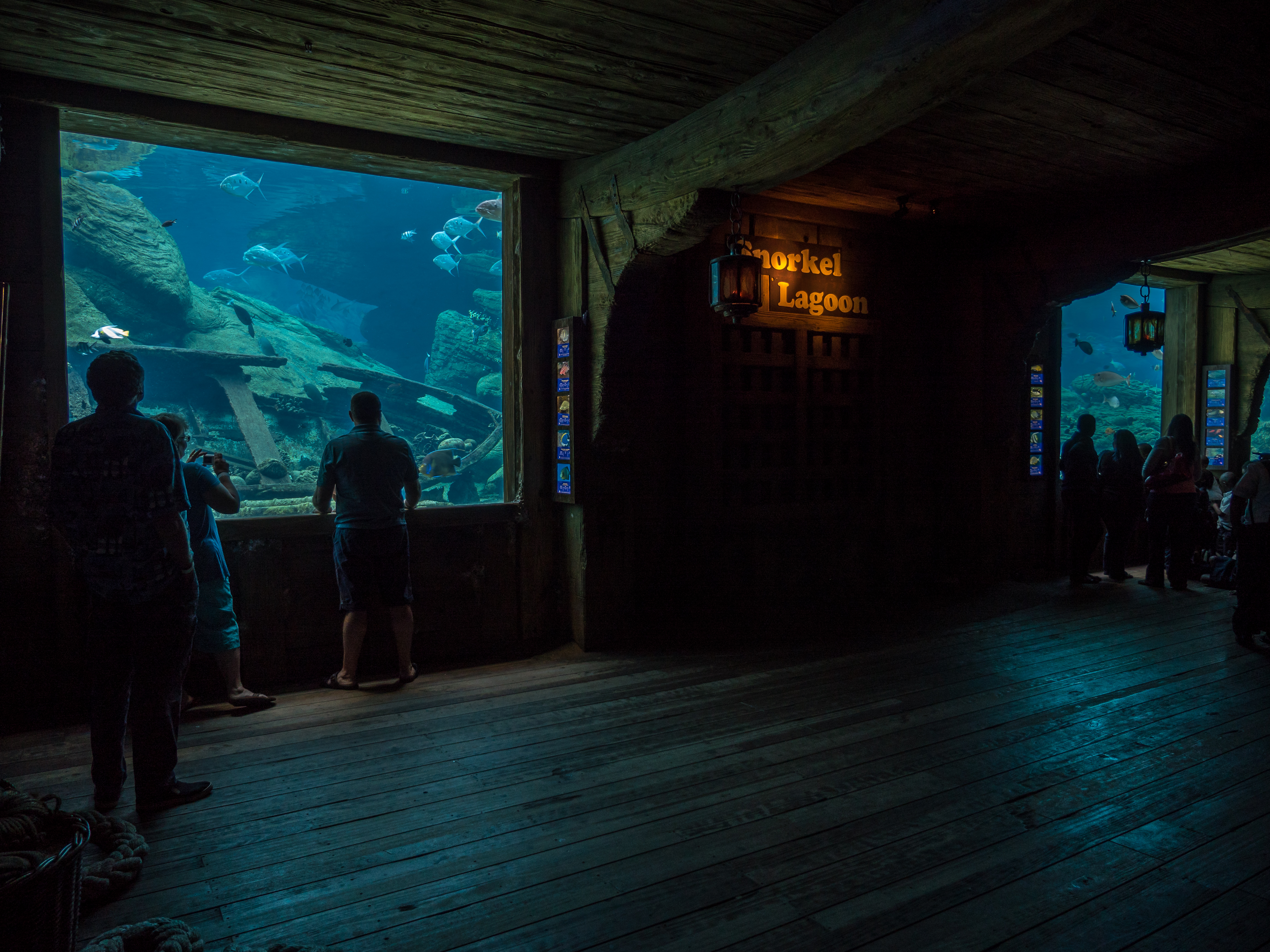
Snorkel Lagoon

Designed by American firm Creative Kingdom Inc. Shaka Marine World opened on 30 April 2004 after 3 years of development. In 2005, the park was awarded for "Outstanding Achievement in thematic creative design" by the Themed Entertainment Association.

=== Financial troubles ===
The park was built at a cost of ZAR 700-million and has been subsidized for a total of ZAR 450-million by the eThekwini Metropolitan Municipality. In the 2009–2010 financial year, the park suffered a net loss of ZAR 44.5-million, and a total deficit of ZAR 377.5-million. There were also irregular expenditures (expenditures which did not undergo normal procurement procedures) of ZAR 3.15-million on the park.

== uShaka Wet 'n Wild ==
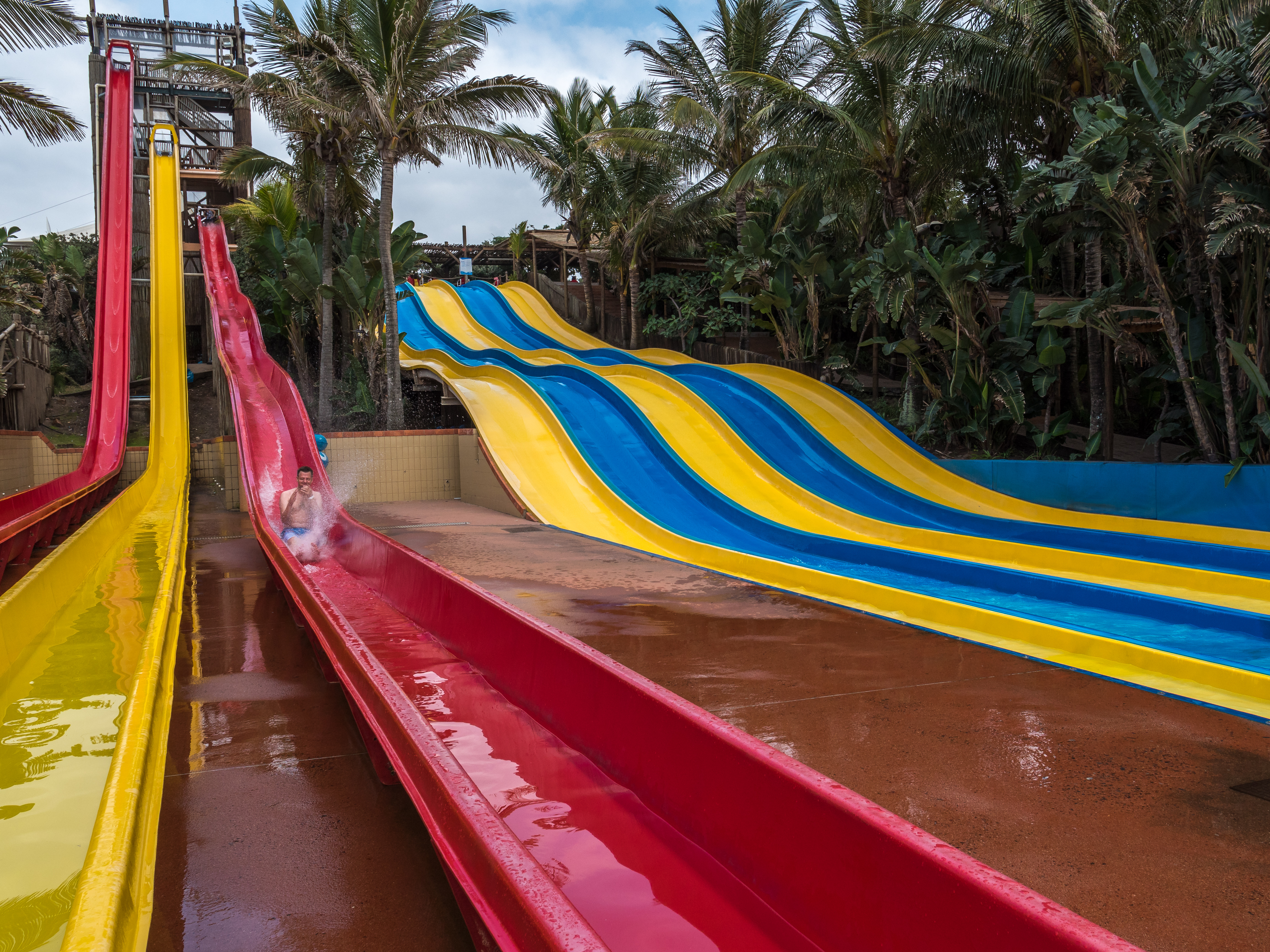

uShaka Wet 'n Wild is a water park inside uShaka Marine World.

== uShaka Beach ==
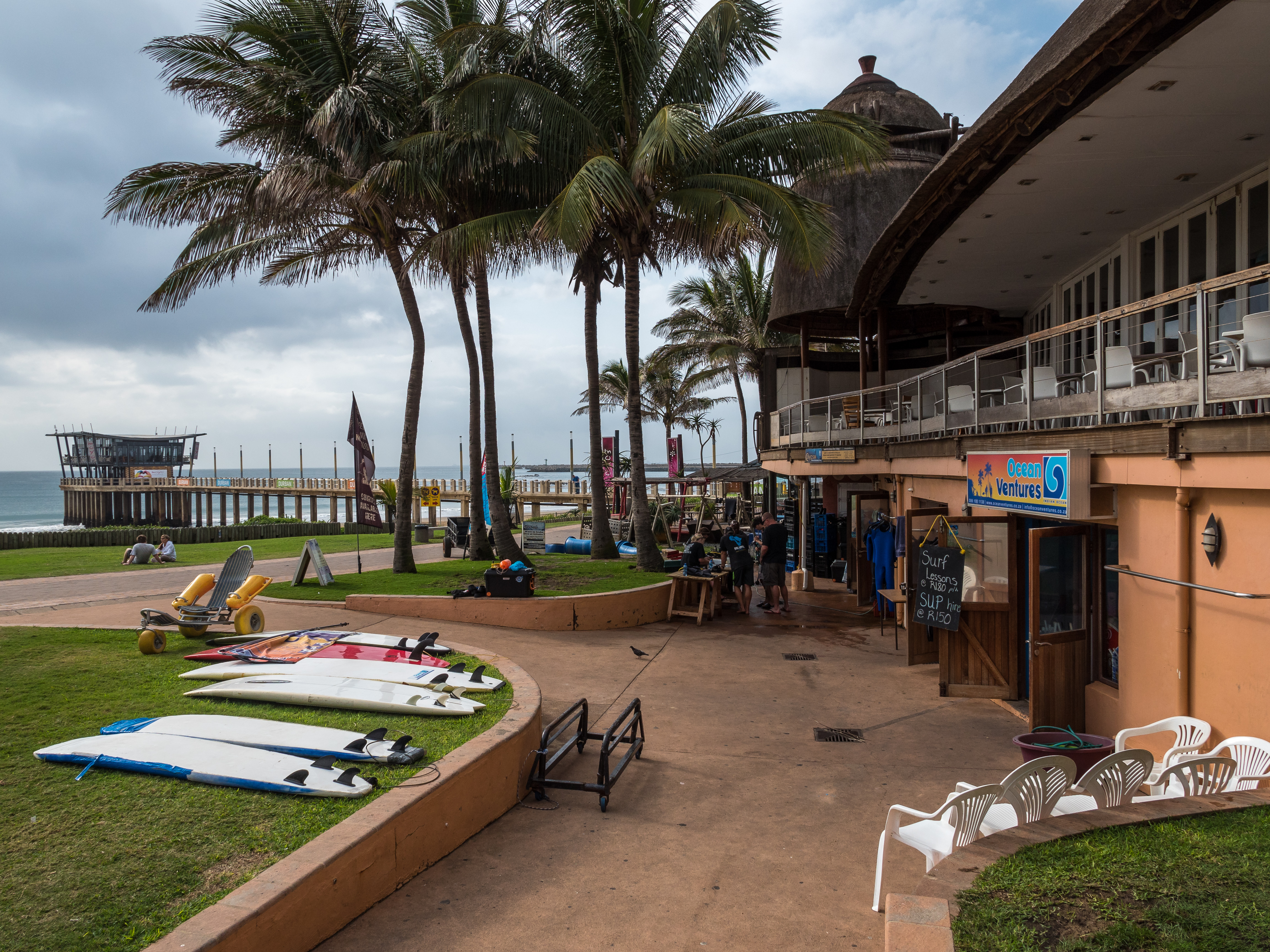

uShaka Beach is a beach which has direct access from the amusement park. It has sand beaches and a large pier leading out into the ocean.

== uShaka Village Walk ==
uShaka Village Walk is designed similar to an African village, and includes restaurants, cafes and numerous shops.

== uShaka Dangerous Creatures ==
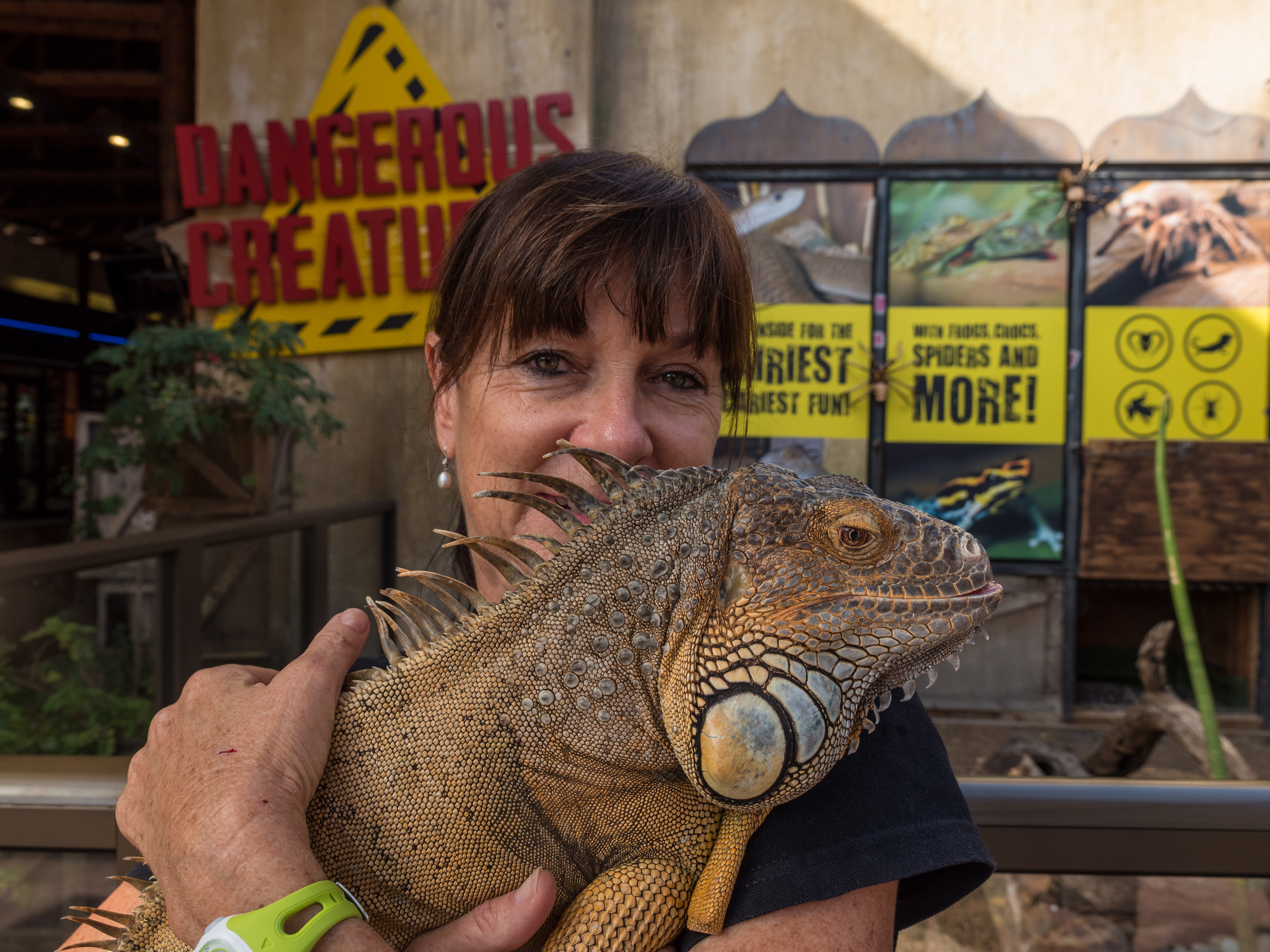

Dangerous Creatures is an adventure for reptile enthusiasts and adrenaline junkies.

== Chimp and Zee ==
Chimp & Zee has the longest continuous belay system in Africa, and is a rope adventure park.
