= List of water parks in Europe =

The following is a list of water parks in Europe sorted by region.

== Albania ==
- Aquapark Blue Magic Water, Kashar
- Aquapark Prestige Resort, Golem
- Equos Resort, near Tirana – Largest water park in Albania

== Armenia ==
- Aquapark Harsnaqar, Sevan
- Aquatek, Yerevan
- Water World, Yerevan

== Austria ==
- Area 47, Haiming, Tyrol
- Allegria Resort & Therme Stegersbach, Stegersbach
- Alpenrose Water Park, Lermoos
- Alpentherme Gastein, Bad Gastein
- Asia Spa Leoben, Leoben
- Aqua Dome, Längenfeld
- Aquapulco die Piratenwelt, Bad Schallerbach
- Das Edelweiss, Grossarl
- H_{2}O Hotel-Therme, Bad Waltersdorf
- Hotel Lacknerhof, Flachau
- Kaiserbad Ellmau, Ellmau
- Kinderhotel Kröller, Gerlos
- Terme Amadé, Altenmarkt im Pongau
- Therme Fohnsdorf, Fohnsdorf
- Terme Loipersdorf, Bad Loipersdorf
- Terme Villach, Villach
- Sonnentherme Lutzmannsburg, Lutzmannsburg
- Stubay Telfes, Telfes

== Azerbaijan ==
- AF Hotel Aqua Park, Baku, Azerbaijan
- Dalga Beach, Mardakan

== Belarus ==
- Waterpark Lebyazhij, Minsk

== Belgium ==
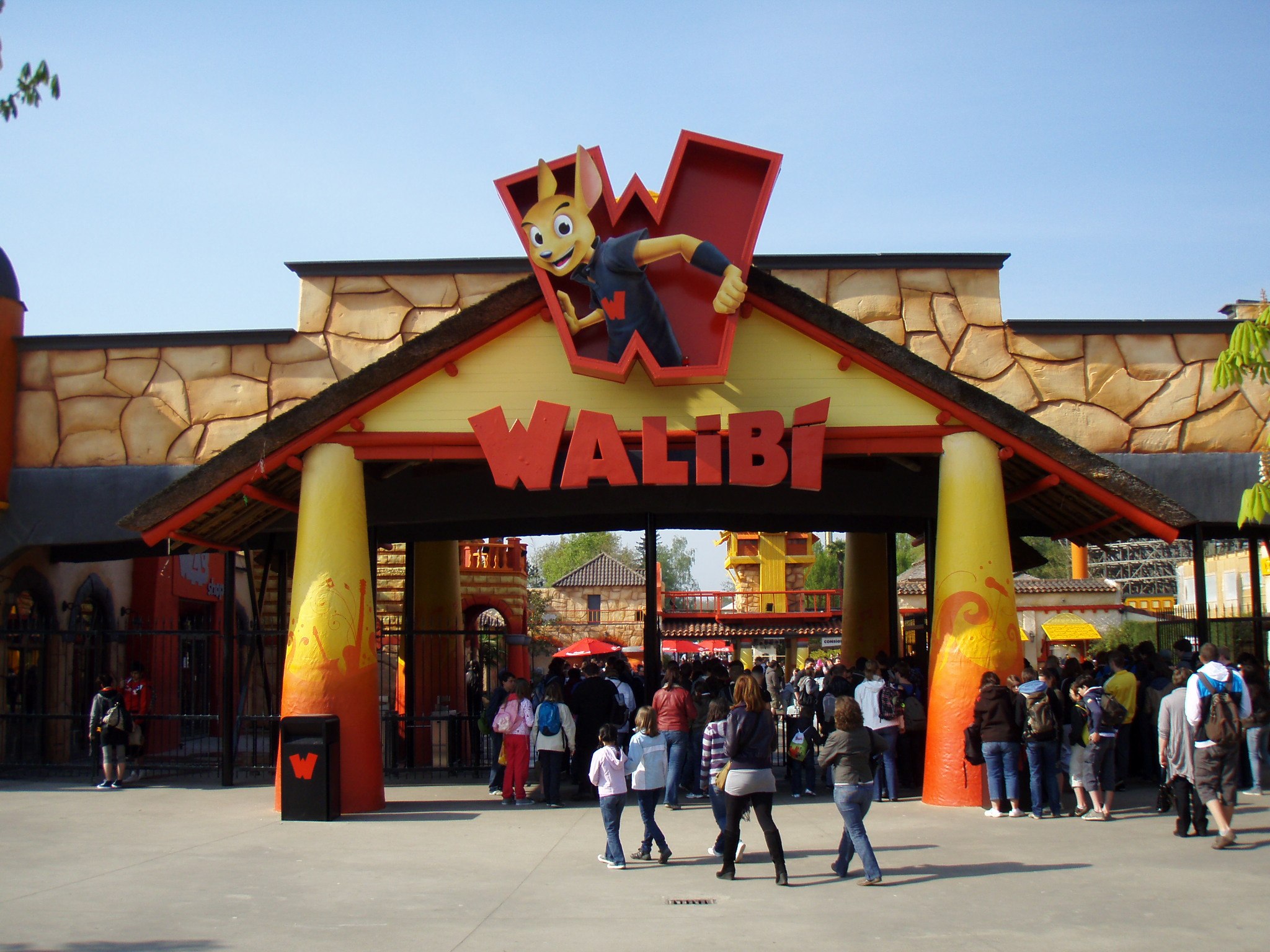
Entrance of Walibi Belgium

- Aqualibi in Wavre
- Duinenwater Knokke-Heist, Knokke-Heist
- Molenheide Houthalen-Helchteren, Houthalen-Helchteren
- Plopsaqua De Panne, De Panne
- Plopsaqua Hannut-Landen, Hannut

=== Center Parcs Europe holiday villages ===
- AquaMundo Center Parcs Erperheide Peer, Peer
- AquaMundo Center Parcs De Vossemeren Lommel, Lommel
- Aqua Mundo Center Parcs Park De Haan, De Haan, Belgium
- Aqua Mundo Center Parcs Les Ardennes, Vielsalm
- Aqua Mundo Center Parcs Terhills Resort, Dilsen-Stokkem
- Sunparks Kempense Meren, Mol
- Sunparks Oostduinkerke aan zee, Koksijde

== Bosnia and Herzegovina ==
- Grad Sunca, Trebinje – Largest water park in Bosnia and Herzegovina

== Bulgaria ==
- Action Aquapark, Sunny Beach
- Aquamania Albena, Albena
- Aquapark Grifid, Golden Sands
- Aquapark Neptun, Ravadinovo
- Aquapark Nessebar, Nesebar
- Aqua Planet, Primorsko
- Aquapark Sofia, Sofia
- Aquapark Sunset Pomorie, Pomorie
- Aquapark Topola Skies, Bozhurets
- Aquapark Vazrazhdane, Sofia
- Kuban Resort and Aquapark, Sunny Beach
- Waterland, Ovoshtnik

== Croatia ==
- Istralandia, Brtonigla, Istria County
- Aquacolors, near Poreč
- Aquapark Dalmaland, Biograd na Moru
- Aquapark Martilandia, Sveti Martin na Muri

== Cyprus ==
- Aquapark Elexus, Agios Epiktitos
- Fasouri Watermania, Limassol – has Europe's biggest wave pool.
- Paphos Aphrodite Waterpark, Paphos
- Splash Waterpark, Chloraka
- WaterWorld Themed WaterPark, Ayia Napa – one of the world's largest themed water parks and one of the 12 best water parks of the world

== Czech Republic ==
- Aqua Park Špindlerův Mlýn
- Aquacentrum Šutka
- Aquaforum Františkovy Lázně
- Aqualand Moravia
- AquaPalace Praha – located just outside of Prague, it is one of the largest Central European water worlds, full of toboggans, slides, pools and more water attractions
- Aquapark Kladno
- Aquapark Klášterec nad Ohří
- Aquapark Olešná
- Aquapark Olomouc
- Aquapark Uherské Hradiště
- Aquapark Vyškov
- Centrum Babylon Liberec
- Vodní ráj Jihlava
- Vodní svět Sareza
- AquaCentrum Pardubice

== Denmark ==
- Aquapark, in Fårup Summer Park – the largest water park of any amusement park in the country.
- Vandland, in Djurs Sommerland.
- The Lalandia Aquadome, in Billund – Scandinavia's largest water park.
- The Lalandia Aquadome, in Rødby.

== Estonia ==
- Tervise Paradiis in Pärnu
- H2O Waterpark in Viimsi
- Kalev Spa Water Park in Tallinn
- Aqua Spa in Rakvere
- Noorus Veepark in Narva-Jõesuu
- Aura Waterpark in Tartu

== Finland ==
- Caribia Spa, Turku – a water park/spa, Caribbean style
- Flamingo Spa, near the Finnish capital Helsinki
- Fontanella, Siilinjärvi, near Kuopio
- Jukupark Kalajoki, Kalajoki
- Jukupark Turku, Turku
- Puuhamaa, Tervakoski
- Scandic Eden Nokia - a waterpark/spa in Nokia, near Tampere
- Serena Waterpark, Espoo, near the Finnish capital Helsinki
- Tropiclandia, Vaasa
- Visulahti, Mikkeli

== France ==
- Aqua Boulevard, Paris
- Aqua Family, Hyères
- Aqualand – 8 Aqualand water parks exist in France
- Aquaparc Le Pommier, Villeneuve-de-Berg
- Aquariaz, Morzine
- Aquascope water park, Chasseneuil-du-Poitou
- Aquasplash, Antibes
- Atlantic Tobogga water park, Saint-Hilaire-de-Riez
- O'Gliss Park, Le Bernard
- Western Park, Biguglia

=== Center Parcs Europe holiday villages ===
- Aqua Mundo Center Parcs Le Bois aux Daims, Les Trois-Moutiers
- Aqua Mundo Center Parcs Les Bois Francs, Verneuil-sur-Avre
- Aqua Mundo Center Parcs Les Hauts de Bruyères, Chaumont-sur-Tharonne
- Aqua Mundo Center Parcs Le Lac d'Ailette, Chamouille
- Aqua Mundo Center Parcs Les Landes de Gascogne, Beauziac
- Aqua Mundo Center Parcs Les Trois Forêts, Hattigny
- Aqua Mundo Villages Nature, Villeneuve-le-Comte

== Georgia ==
- Aquapark Gagra, Gagra
- Aqua Lazika, Anaklia
- Aqua Park, Batumi
- Gino Paradise Tbilisi, Tbilisi

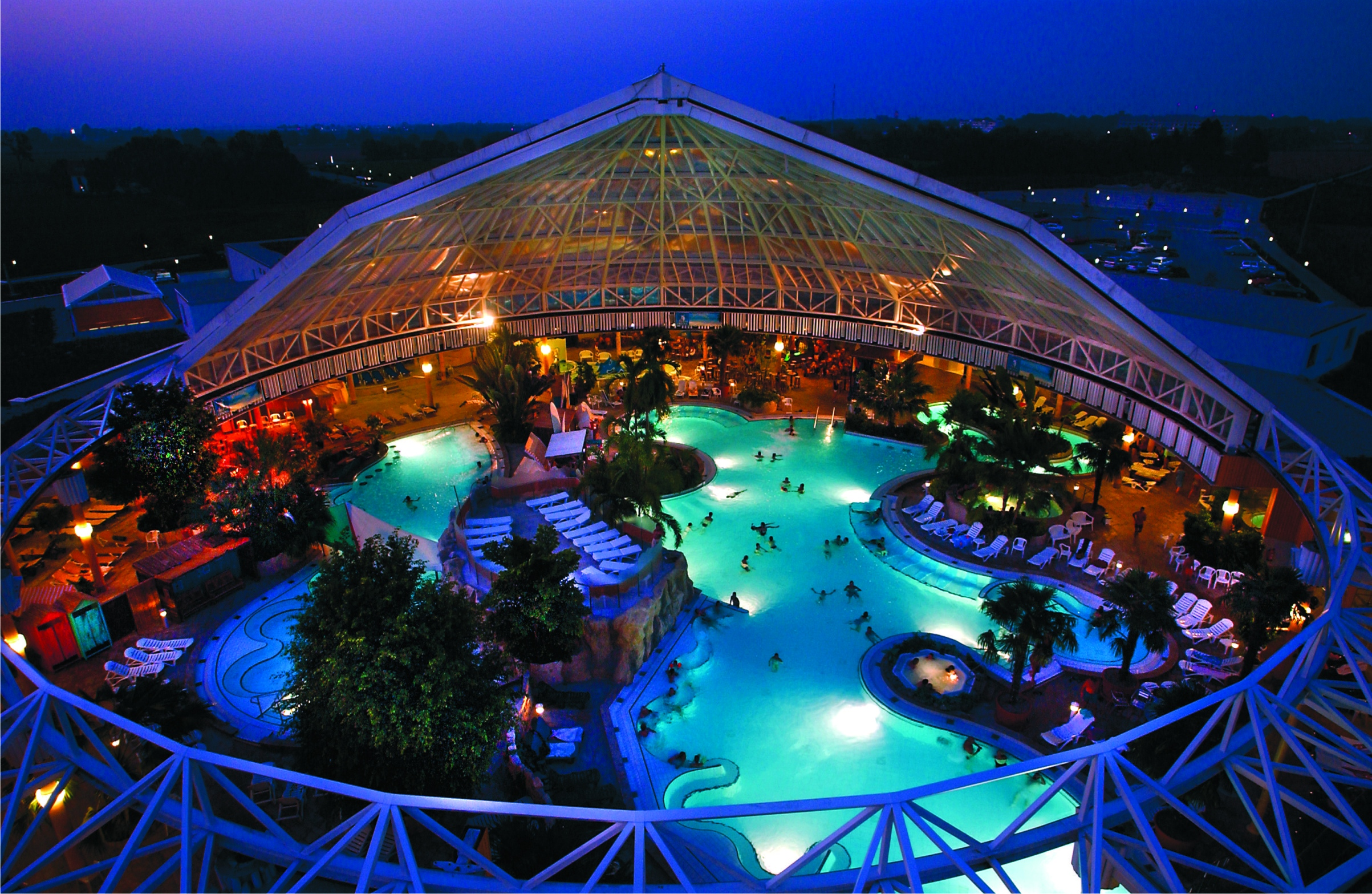
Sauna, thermal pools, and Stonehenge at Therme Erding

== Germany ==
Water park	Location	State	Opened	Number of slides
Therme Erding	Erding	Bavaria	1999	28
Rulantica	Rust	Baden-Württemberg	2019	28
Badeparadies Schwarzwald	Titisee-Neustadt	Baden-Württemberg	2010	23
Tropical Islands Resort	Krausnick	Brandenburg	2004	20+
AquaMagis	Plettenberg	North Rhine-Westphalia	2003	19
Kristall Palm Beach	Stein	Bavaria	1977	15
Miramar	Weinheim	Baden-Württemberg	1974	10
Aqualand Köln	Cologne	North Rhine-Westphalia	1991	9
Europabad Karlsruhe	Karlsruhe	Baden-Württemberg	2008	8
Aqua Mundo Allgäu	Leutkirch im Allgäu	Baden-Württemberg	2008	10
Donautherme Ingolstadt	Ingolstadt	Bavaria	2022	7
Freizeitbad Atlantis Herzogenaurach	Herzogenaurach	Bavaria	1994	7
WONNEMAR Wismar	Wismar	Mecklenburg-Vorpommern	2000	7
Nettebad	Osnabrück	Lower Saxony	2005	7
Calypso Bade- und Saunawelt	Saarbrücken	Saarland	1998	5
Fürthermare	Fürth	Bavaria	2007	5
Atlantis Dorsten	Dorsten	North Rhine-Westphalia	2001	5
Maya Mare	Halle	Saxony-Anhalt	1999	4

=== Center Parcs Europe holiday villages ===
- Aqua Mundo Park Allgäu, Leutkirch im Allgäu
- Aqua Mundo Bispinger Heide, Bispingen
- Aqua Mundo Park Bostalsee, Nohfelden
- Aqua Mundo Park Eifel, Gunderath
- Aqua Mundo Park Hochsauerland, Medebach
- Aqua Mundo Park Nordseeküste, Butjadingen

== Greece ==
- Aqua Creta Limnoupolis Water Park, Crete – Family entertainment with relaxation
- Acqua Plus Water Park, Crete – a member of World Waterpark Association (WWA)
- Aqualand Corfu – the largest water park in Greece and third-largest in Europe
- Lido Waterpark, Kos Island – member of World Waterpark Association
- Watercity in Crete – a member of World Waterpark Association (WWA)
- Splash Waterpark, Isthmos, Corinth
- Aquapolis, Spata, Attiki
- Waterland WaterPark, Thessaloniki
- Waterpark, Faliraki, Rhodes
- Aquatica waterpark Kos
- Santorini water park
- Onaqua sea sports park
- Waterfun S.A.
- Caretta beach resort & waterpark

== Hungary ==
- Annagora Aquapark, Balatonfüred
- Aqua Centrum Csúszdapark Cegléd, Cegléd
- AquaCity, Zalaegerszeg
- Aqua Island Esztergom, Esztergom
- Aquapark Hajduszoboszlo, Hajdúszoboszló – the largest spa complex in Europe
- Aquaréna, Mogyoród
- Aquaticum Mediterrán Élményfürdő & water park, Debrecen
- Aquaworld, Budapest – one of the largest European year-round water theme parks, in the style of a Cambodian Angkor temple
- Ceglédi Gyógyfürdő és Szabadidőközpont, Cegléd
- Demjén Thermal Spa & Aquapark, Demjén
- Gyulai Várfürdő, Gyulai
- Harkányfürdő, Harkány
- Kecskeméti Élményfürdő és Csúszdapark, Kecskemét
- Napfényfürdő Aquapolis, Szeged
- Palatinus Strand, Margaret Island, Budapest
- RQ Water Experience Park and Spa, Győr
- Szent Erzsébet Mórahalmi Gyógyfürdő, Mórahalmi

== Iceland ==
- Sundlaug Hornafjarðar, Höfn
- Sundlaug Kópavogs, Kópavogur

== Ireland ==
- Aqua Dome water park Tralee, County Kerry
- Aquazone at the National Aquatic Centre, Blanchardstown, Dublin
- Clara Lara FunPark, County Wicklow
- Funtasia Waterpark, Drogheda, County Louth
- Splash World, Tramore, County Waterford
- Baysports, Hodson Bay, County Roscommon
- Waterworld, Bundoran, County Donegal

=== Center Parcs UK and Ireland holiday villages ===
- Center Parcs Longford Forest, Ballymahon, County Longford

== Italy ==
- Acquavillage, Follonica, Livorno
- Aquafan, Riccione, Rimini
- Aquajoss, Conselice, Ravenna
- Acquavillage, Cecina
- Acquaworld, Concorezzo
- Caneva Acquapark, Lazise, Verona
- Caribe Bay, Jesolo, Venice
- Etnaland, Belpasso, Catania
- Gardaland waterpark, Milan
- Le Vele Acquapark, San Gervasio Bresciano
- Mirabilandia Beach, Ravenna
- Odissea 2000, Corigliano-Rossano
- Ondaland, Vicolungo, Novara
- Parco Acquatico Atlantica, Cesenatico
- Rainbow Magic Land, Valmontone, Rome
- River Park, Rivergaro
- Sunlight Park, Tirrenia, Pisa
- Zoomarine, Torvaianica, Pomezia

== Kosovo ==
- Aquapark Milenium, Ferizaj
- Aqua Park Mitrovica, Mitrovica
- Aqua Park Pejë, Peja
- Ujevara Resort Aquapark, Ferizaj – Largest water park in Kosovo

== Liechtenstein ==
- Freibad Mühleholz, Vaduz

== Latvia ==
- Livu Akvaparks, Jūrmala, near Riga
- Ventspils Pludmales akvaparks, Ventspils
- Ūdens piedzīvojumu parks, Ventspils

== Lithuania ==
- Druskininkų Vandens Parkas, Druskininkai
- Vichy Vandens Parkas, Vilnius

== Luxembourg ==
- Les Thermes, Strassen, Luxembourg

== Malta ==
- Splash & Fun Water Park

== Moldova ==
- Aqua Magis, Sociteni
- Vara Vara Aquacity, Chișinău

== Montenegro ==
- Aqua park Mediteran, Bečići

== Netherlands ==
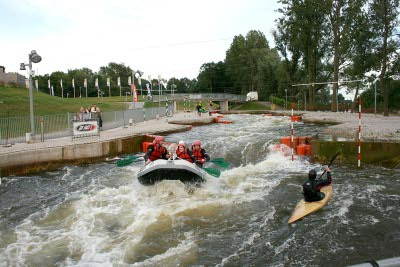
Rafting and canoeing at Dutch Water Dreams

- Aqua Mexicana, Slagharen
- Aquaventura, Hellendoorn
- Dutch Water Dreams, Zoetermeer
- Hof van Saksen, Nooitgedacht
- Landal De Lommerbergen, Reuver
- Landal Het Vennenbos, Hapert
- Splesj, Hoeven
- Tikibad, Wassenaar
- Splash, Hellevoetsluis
- WipeOut, Zoelen

=== Center Parcs Europe holiday villages ===
- Aqua Mundo de Eemhof, Zeewolde
- Aqua Mundo het Heijderbos, Heijen
- Aqua Mundo park Zandvoort, Zandvoort
- Aqua Mundo het Meerdal, America
- Aqua Mundo park Sandur, Emmen
- Aqua Mundo port Zélande, Ouddorp
- Aqua Mundo de Limburgse Peel, America
- Aqua Mundo de Huttenheugte, Dalen
- Aqua Mundo de Kempervennen, Westerhoven

== North Macedonia ==
- Aquapark Izgrev, Kalishta
- Aqua Park Macedonia, Probištip
- Aqua Park Skopje, Skopje

== Norway ==
- Bø Sommarland, Bø i Telemark
- Badelandet water park, Kristiansand
- Pirbadet, Trondheim

== Poland ==
- Aquapark Baseny Wisła, Wisła
- Aquapark Częstochowa, Częstochowa
- Aquapark Fala Łódź, Łódź
- Aquapark Gryfino, Gryfino
- Aquapark H2Ochla, Zielona Góra
- Aquapark H2Ostróg, Racibórz
- Aquapark Kalisz, Kalisz
- Aquapark Koszalin, Koszalin
- Aquapark Kraków, Kraków
- Aquapark Kutno, Kutno
- Aquapark Lake Hill Mazury Resort, Ostróda
- Aquapark Leśna, Leśna
- Aquapark Margonin, Margonin
- Aquapark Międzyzdroje, Międzyzdroje
- Aquapark Nemo, Dąbrowa Górnicza
- Aquapark Nysa, Nysa
- Aquapark Piła, Piła
- Aquapark Płock, Płock
- Aquapark Polkowice, Polkowice
- Aquapark Panorama Morska, Jarosławiec
- Aquapark Reda, Reda
- Aquapark Sandra Spa, Karpacz
- Aquapark Sandra Spa, Pogorzelica
- Aquapark Solec, Solec Kujawski
- Aquapark Sopot, Sopot
- Aquapark Suwałki, Suwałki
- Aquapark Tarnowskie Góry, Tarnowskie Góry
- Aquapark Trzy Fale, Słupsk
- Aquapark Tychy, Tychy – Has the only AquaLoop slide in Poland
- Aquapark Wrocław, Wrocław
- Aquapark Zakopane, Zakopane
- Aquapark Zalewski, Mrzeżyno
- Aquapark Zielona Góra, Zielona Góra
- Aquadrom, Ruda Śląska
- Aqua Lublin, Lublin
- Aqua Zdrój, Wałbrzych
- Baltic Park Molo Aquapark, Świnoujście
- Binkowski Resort and Waterpark, Kielce
- Energylandia Water Park, Zator
- Moczydło Water Park, Warsaw
- Park Wodny Jan, Darłowo
- Park Wodny Octopus, Suchy Las
- Tarnowskie Termy, Tarnowo Podgórne
- Terma Bania, Białka Tatrzańska
- Termy Bukowina Tatrzańska, Bukowina Tatrzańska
- Termy Chochołowskie, Chochołów
- Termy Cieplickie, Jelenia Góra
- Termy Gorący Potok, Szaflary
- Termy Maltańskie, Poznań
- Termy Uniejów, Uniejów
- Termy Warmińskie, Lidzbark Warmiński
- Suntago, Wręcza – Largest water park in Poland
- Warmia Park, Pluski
- Warszawianka Water Park, Warsaw
- Water Factory Szczecin

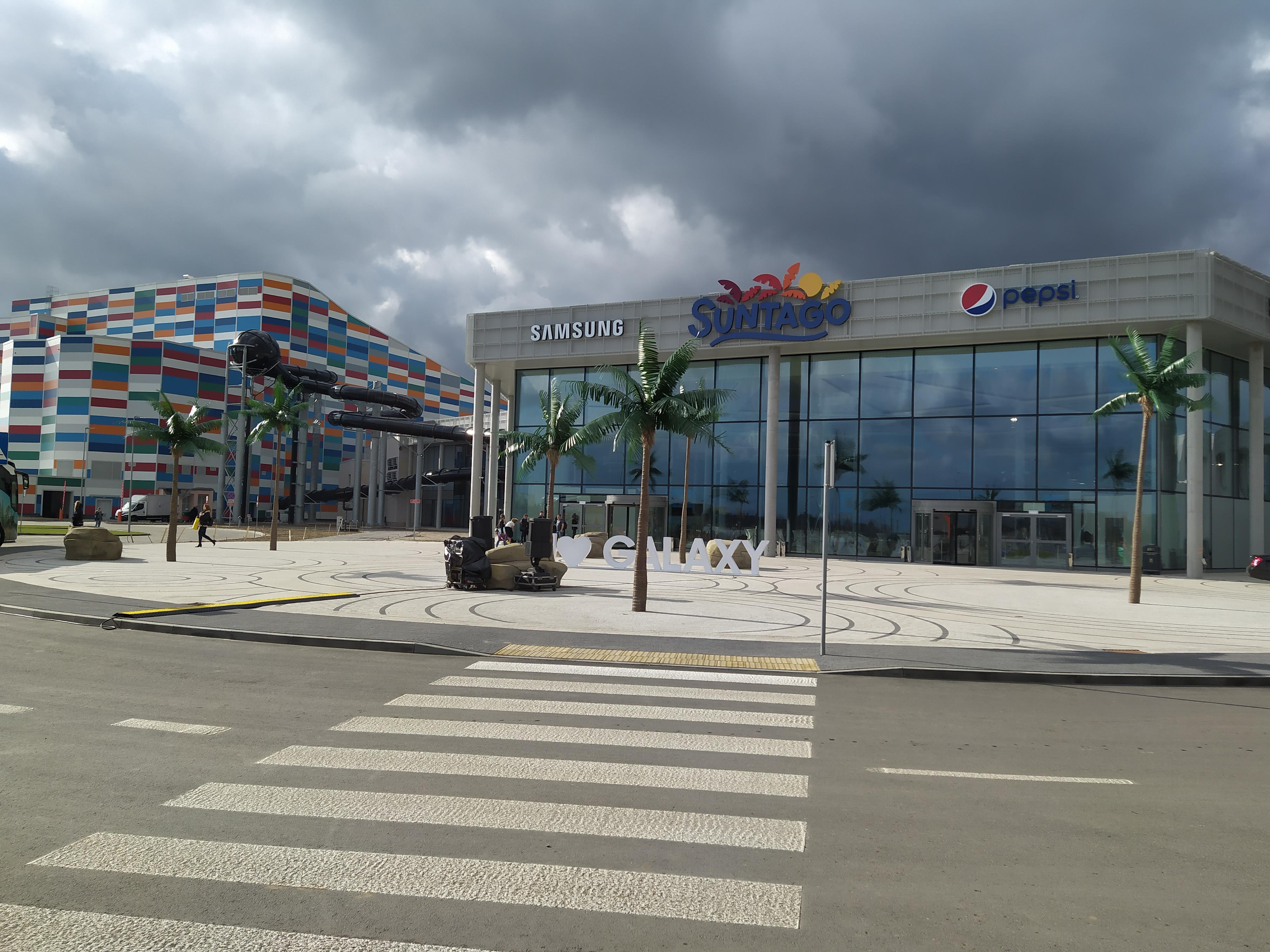
Entrance of Suntago

=== Gołębiewski Hotels ===
- A chain of water park hotels in Poland

==== List of all Hotel Gołębiewski water parks ====
- Aquapark Tropikana, Białystok
- Aquapark Tropikana, Karpacz
- Aquapark Tropikana, Mikołajki
- Aquapark Tropikana, Pobierowo
- Aquapark Tropikana, Wisła

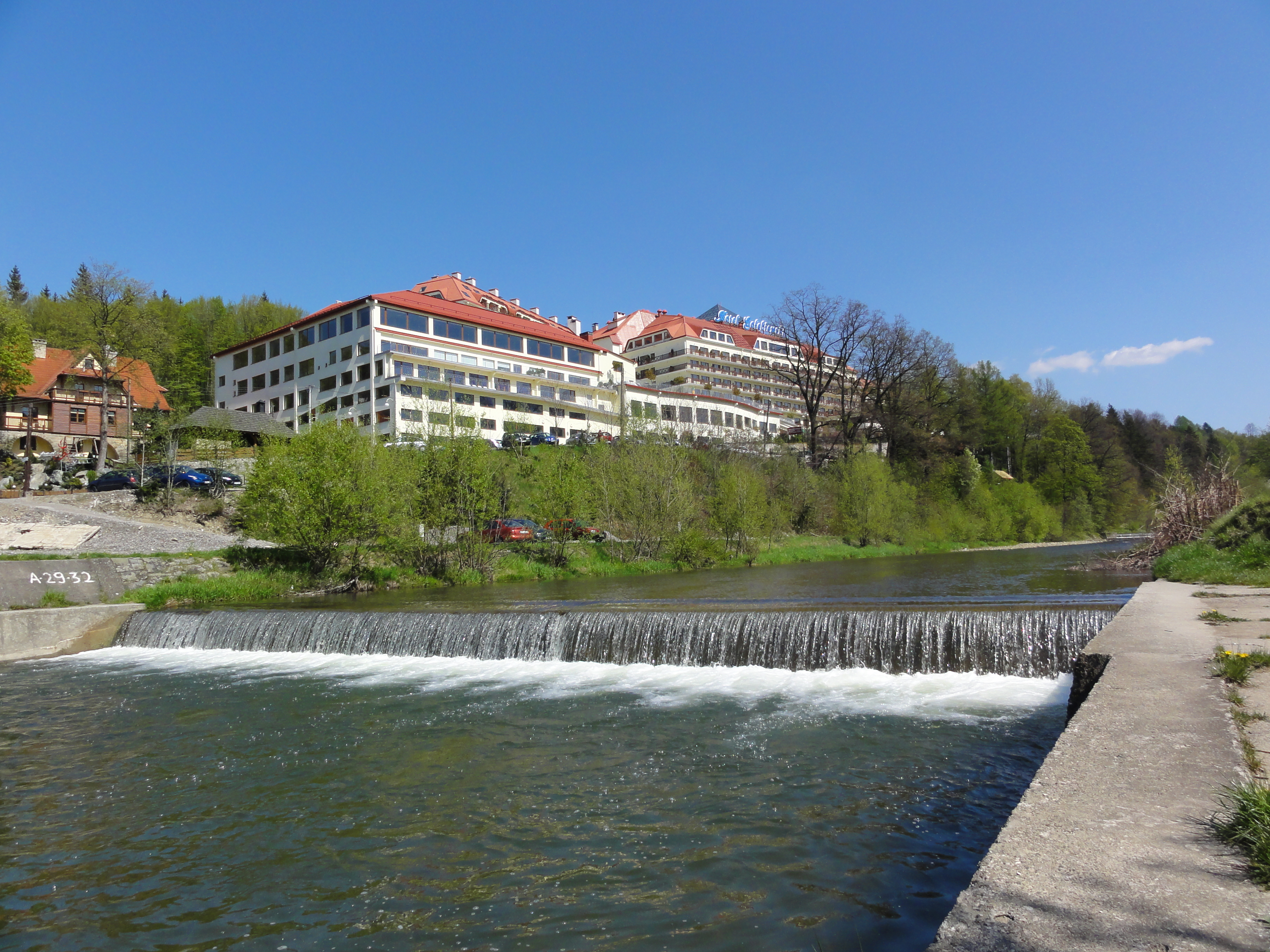
Hotel Gołębiewski in Wisła

== Portugal ==
- Aqualand, Alcantarilha
- Aquashow Park Hotel water park, Quarteira
- Slide & Splash, Lagoa
- Zoomarine, Guia
- Norpark, Nazaré
- Sportágua, Peniche
- Aquagruta, Mira de Aire
- Aquafixe, Torre de Moncorvo
- Panorâmico Aquaparque, Pombal
- Parque Aquático Costa do Sol, Caldas das Felgueiras
- Complexo Desportivo Príncipe Perfeito, Cabanões
- Praia Fluvial do Almargem, Almargem
- Parque Aquático de Santarém, Santarém
- Vaga Splash, Gafanha da Boa Hora
- Parque Aquático de Fafe, Fafe
- Parque Aquático de Amarante, Amarante
- Parque Aquático do Crato, Crato
- Clube do Rio, Baixa da Banheira
- Mariparque, Praia da Vieira
- Scorpio, Mascotelos
- NaturWaterPark, Vila Real

=== Slide & Splash ===
- Slide & Splash is a chain of water parks in Portugal. It opened on June 10, 1986. Seasonal water park with slides, pools and rides plus live falconry, reptile and tropical bird shows.

==== Transportation ====
- Quarteira / Vilamoura
- Albufeira
- São Rafael / Galé
- Armação de Pêra
- Carvoeiro
- Ferragudo
- Alvor / Praia Rocha / Portimão
- Burgau / Praia da Luz / Lagos
- Sagres / Salema, Portugal
- Sotavento Algarvio, the eastern part of the Algarve region, Portugal, around Faro

==== Attractions ====
- Corkscrew
- Banzai
- Big Slides
- Jacuzzi
- Former Swimming Pool
- Children Swimming Pool
- Jumps
- Black Hole
- Plunge
- Tornado
- Kamikaze
- the new Big Wave
- Kamikaze
- Foam Slides
- Children Foam Slides
- Kamikaze Renewal
- Crazy River
- River Dive

== Romania ==
- Amazonia Aquapark, Timișoara
- Aquapark Cornișa, Botoșani
- Aquapark Nymphaea, Oradea
- Aquapark President, Sânmartin, Bihor
- Aqua Magic Mamaia, Constanța
- Divertiland, Chiajna, Ilfov county, near Bucharest
- Galaxy Water Park, Jupiter, Romania
- Paradisul Acvatic, Brașov, Brașov county
- Therme Bucharest, Balotești, Ilfov county, near Bucharest
- Water Park Otopeni, Otopeni, Ilfov county, near Bucharest

== Russia ==
- Karibia, Perovo District, Moscow
- KVA-KVA Park, Mytishchi, Moscow Oblast
- MOREON, Yasenevo District, Moscow
- Piterland, Saint Petersburg
- Tiki-Tak, Anapa, Krasnodar Krai
- Zolotoj Plyazh, Anapa, Krasnodar Krai
- Zolotaya Bukhta, Gelendzhik, Krasnodar Krai
- Aqualoo, Soshi, Krasnodar Krai
- Riviera, Kazan, Tatarstan
- Limpopo, Yekaterinburg, Sverdlovsk oblast
- H2O, Rostov-on-Don, Rostov Oblast

== Serbia ==
- Aqua Park Hollywoodland, Belgrade
- Aqua Park Izvor, Arandjelovac, in Bukovička Banja spa center
- Aqua Park Jagodina, Jagodina
- Aqua Park Jugovo, Smederevo
- Aqua Park Petroland, Bački Petrovac near Novi Sad
- Aqua Park Podina, in Sokobanja spa center
- Aqua Park Raj, Vrnjačka Banja
- Aqua Park Sand City, Banatski Karlovac
- Aqua Park S Klub, Jakovo
- Aqua Park Ub, Ub
- Terme Vrujci, Banja Vrujci

== Slovakia ==
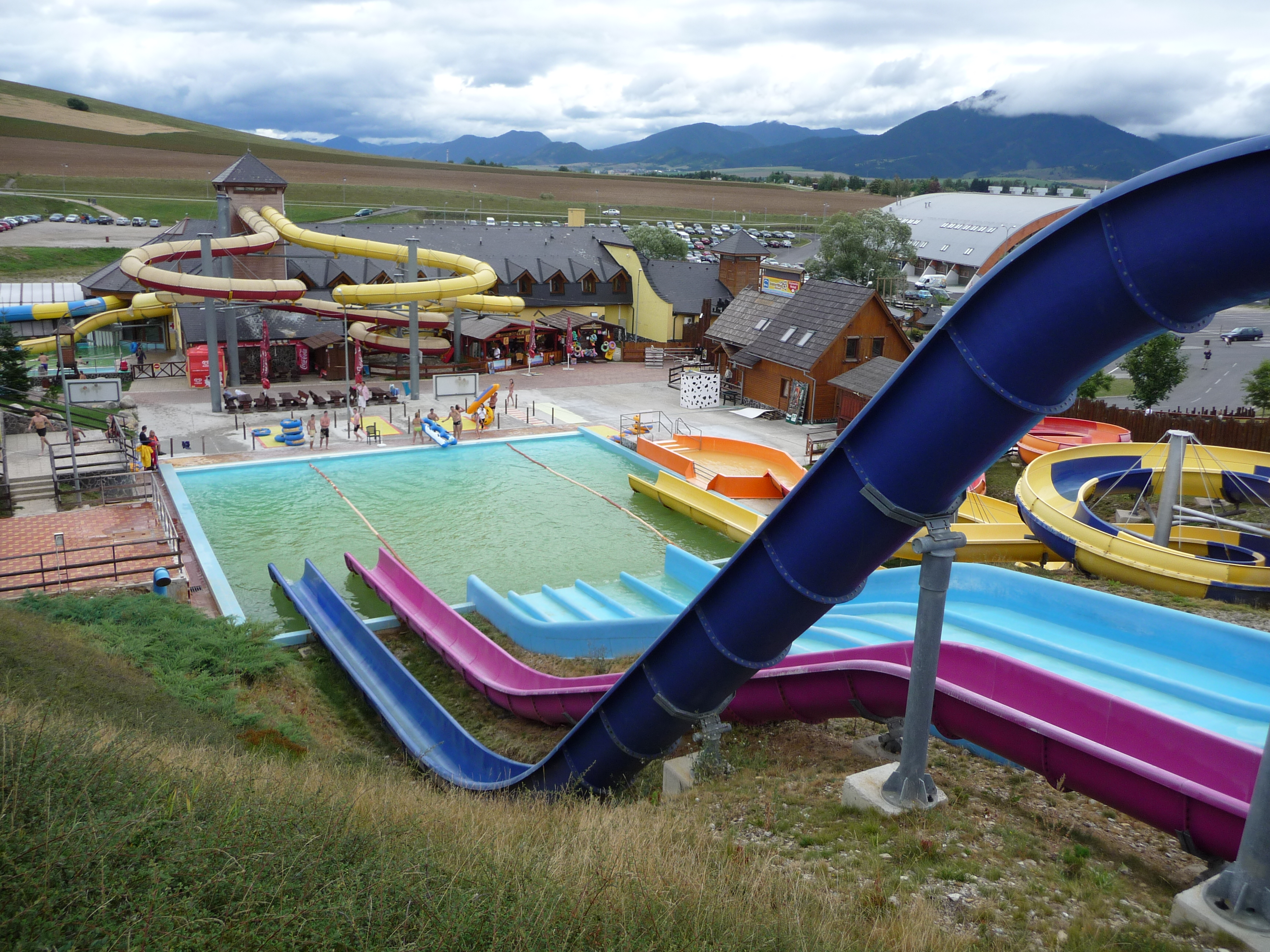
Water slides at Aquapark Tatralandia

- Aquacity Poprad, Poprad
- Aquapark Tatralandia, Liptovský Mikuláš
- Aquapark Senec, Senec
- GinoParadise Bešeňová, Bešeňová
- Spa & Aquapark Turčianske Teplice, Turčianske Teplice
- Thermal Corvinus, Veľký Meder
- Thermalpark Dunajská Streda, Dunajská Streda

== Slovenia ==
- Terme 3000, Moravske Toplice
- Terme Čatež, Čatež ob Savi
- Terme Krka, Dolenjske Toplice
- Terme Ptuj, Ptuj
- Terme Olimia, Podčetrtek
- Aquapark Atlantis, Ljubljana
- Aquapark Bohinj, Bohinjska Bistrica

== Spain ==
- Aqualand Costa Adeje, Costa Adeje, Tenerife, Canary Islands
- Aqualand Bahía de Cádiz, El Puerto de Santa María, Cádiz
- Aqualand Maspalomas, Maspalomas, Gran Canaria, Canary Islands
- Aqualand El Arenal, Llucmajor, Mallorca
- Aqualand Torremolinos, Torremolinos, Málaga
- Aqualandia, Benidorm, Alicante
- Aquapark de Cerceda, Cerceda, A Coruña
- Aquopolis Costa Dorada, La Pineda, Tarragona
- Aquopolis Villanueva de la Cañada, Villanueva de la Cañada, Madrid
- Aquopolis Torrevieja, Torrevieja, Alicante
- Aquopolis Sevilla, Seville
- Aquopolis Cartaya, Cartaya, Huelva
- Aquopolis Cullera, Cullera, Valencia
- Aqua Natura, Benidorm, Alicante
- Aquarama, Benicàssim, Castellón
- Parque Acuático Mijas, Aquamijas, Fuengirola, Málaga
- Lago Taurito, Mogán, Gran Canaria, Canary Islands
- Aquasierra, Villafranca de Córdoba, Córdoba
- Hidropark, Alcúdia, Mallorca, Balearic Islands
- PortAventura Aquatic Park, Salou, Tarragona
- Siam Park, Tenerife, Canary Islands
- Water World, Lloret de Mar, Girona
- Western Water Park, Magaluf, Mallorca, Balearic Islands
- Aquavelis, Torre del Mar, Málaga
- Aquatropic, Almuñécar, Granada
- Mariopark, Roquetas de Mar, Almería
- AquaVera Parque Acuático, Vera, Almería
- Aqua Natura, Espiardo, Murcia
- Aqualeon, Albinyana, Tarragona
- Illa Fantasía, Vilassar de Dalt, Barcelona
- Lusiberia, Badajoz
- Marineland Catalunya, Palafolls, Barcelona
- Aquadiver, Platja d'Aro, Girona
- Aquabrava, Roses, Girona
- Agua Mágica, Seville
- Acua Waterpark, Corralejo, Fuerteventura, Canary Islands
- Aquarock, Cala en Bosc, Menorca, Balearic Islands
- Aqua Center, Torre del Ram, Menorca, Balearic Islands
- Parque Warner Beach, San Martín de la Vega, Madrid
- Twisted Waterpark, BH Hotel, Magaluf, Mallorca, Balearic Islands
- Guadalpark, Seville

== Sweden ==
- Gustavsvik, Örebro
- Kokpunkten water park, Västerås
- Leksand Sommarland, Leksand
- Liseberg Oceana, Gothenburg (indefinitely closed due to fire)
- Skara Sommarland, Skara
- Sunne vattenland, Sunne
- Tosselilla Summer Park, Tomelilla

== Switzerland ==
- Alpamare, Freienbach
- Aquaparc, Port-Valais
- Aquabasilea, Pratteln
- Aquasplash, Renens
- Säntispark, Gaiserwald
- Splash & Spa, Rivera, Switzerland

== Turkey ==
- Adaland, Kuşadası, Aydın
- Alanya Aqua Park, Alanya
- Aqua Dream Waterpark, Marmaris
- Aqualand Çanakkale, Çanakkale
- AquaJoy, Sorgun
- Atlantis Water Park, Marmaris
- Bodrum Aqualand, Bodrum
- Çukurova Park, Adana
- Aquapark Bağlıca, Ankara
- Aquapark Didim, Didim
- Aquapark Dolphin, Istanbul
- Aquapark Gölbaşı, Ankara
- Aquapark In The Garden, Aziziye
- Aquapark Paloma, Sorgun
- Aquapark Marina, Büyükçekmece
- Aquapark Nashira, Sorgun
- Aquapark Ninova, Bursa
- Aquapark Podyum, Bursa
- Aquapark Trend, Marmara Ereğlisi
- Star Aqua Park, Marmaris
- Aqua Fantasy Aquapark Kuşadası, Aydın
- The Land of Legends, Antalya
- Waterworld Waterpark, Fethiye

== Ukraine ==
- AquaSferra, Donetsk
- Aquapark 7 Ocean, Khmelnytskyi
- Aquapark Atlantis, Yalta
- Aquapark Happy Day, Dnipro
- Aquapark Hawaii, Odesa
- Aquapark Jungle, Kharkiv
- Aquapark Koktebel, Koktebel
- Aquapart Mavka, Bukovel
- Aquapark Mys Dobroy Nadezhdy, Berdiansk
- Aquapark Odesa, Odesa
- Akvapark Ostriv Skarbiv, Kyrylivka
- Aquapark Plyazh, Lviv
- Aquapark Rio, Supranivka
- Aquapark Simeiz, Simeiz
- Aquapark Sudak, Sudak
- Aquapark Terminal, Brovary, near Kyiv
- Aquapark U Lukomor'ya, Yevpatoria
- Aquapark V Ochakovi, Chornomorsk
- Aqupark Zatoka, Zatoka, Odesa Oblast
- Aquapark Zaliznyi Port, Zaliznyi Port
- Aquapark Zurbagan, Sevastopol

== United Kingdom ==
=== England ===
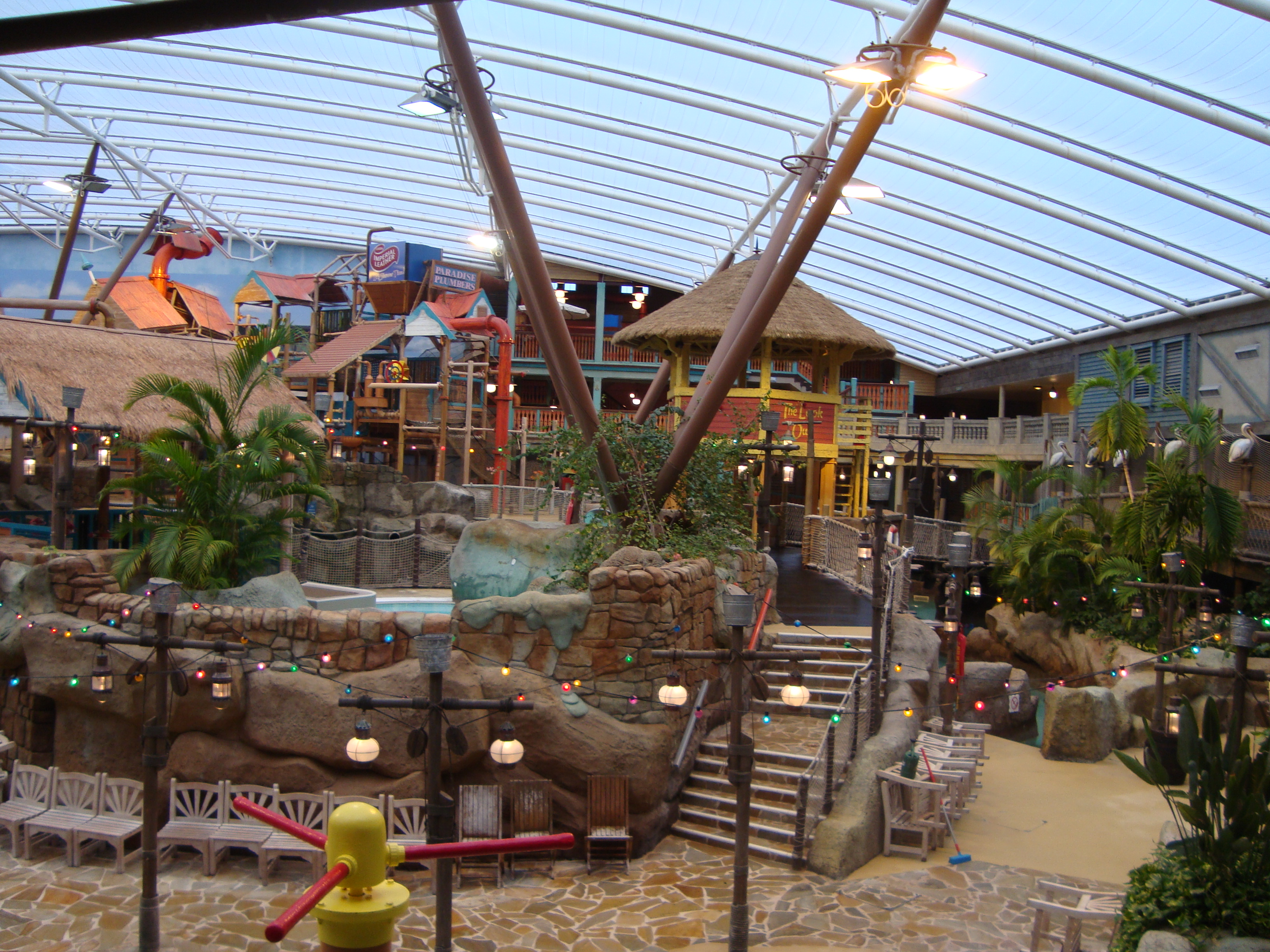
Alton Towers Waterpark, previously named Cariba Creek, at Alton Towers Theme Park

- Alton Towers Waterpark, Staffordshire – also known as Cariba Creek, part of the Alton Towers Resort
- Brean Splash, Brean, Somerset – an indoor and outdoor fun pool at Brean Leisure Park
- Calypso Cove at the Barnsley Metrodome, Barnsley, South Yorkshire
- Coral Reef Waterworld, Bracknell, Berkshire
- Sandcastle, Blackpool – an indoor water park with a tropical theme
- Alpamare, Scarborough, North Yorkshire – Alpine themed indoor & outdoor water park.
- Splashdown Quaywest in Goodrington, Devon – UK's largest open air water park
- Splashdown, Poole, Dorset
- Splash World, Southport, Merseyside
- Water World, Stoke-on-Trent – claims to be the No.1 water park in the UK, with over 400,000 annual visitors
- The Wave, New Union St, Coventry
- Therme Manchester, Trafford Park – Scheduled to open in 2027

==== Center Parcs UK and Ireland holiday villages ====
- Center Parcs Elveden Forest, Brandon
- Center Parcs Longleat Forest, Warminster
- Center Parcs Sherwood Forest, Mansfield
- Center Parcs Whinfell Forest, Penrith
- Center Parcs Woburn Forest, Ampthill

=== Northern Ireland ===
- Aquapark, Andersonstown Leisure Centre, Belfast - has a watercoaster, a body slide, a drop slide, a play frame, and a confidence pool.
- Fun Splash, Bangor Aurora Aquatic And Leisure Complex, Bangor, County Down - has a multi-lane slide, 2 body slides (1 light, 1 dark), a play frame, a wave pool, a halfpipe, and a pirate ship slide called The Bangor Buccaneer.
- Aqualand, Lagan Valley LeisurePlex, Lisburn, County Down - has an inline raft slide, a watercoaster, a bowl slide, a crazy river, a play frame, and a lazy river.
- The Lake, Kilrea, County Londonderry - has a floating obstacle course, 3 jump slides, raft racing, kayaking, paddleboarding, a megaboard balancing challenge, pedaloing, and swimming as well as an inflatable obstacle course with shallow pools and a high ropes course.
- Tropicana, Newcastle, County Down - has a slide and a confidence pool with smaller slides and other features.
- Splash!, Magherafelt, County Londonderry - has a floating obstacle course, paddleboarding, megaboarding, and kayaking.
- Let's Go Hydro, Belfast - has a floating obstacle course, kayaking, paddleboarding, wakeboarding, building and racing boats, and swimming as well as forest walks, camping, glamping, and luxury lodges.

=== Scotland ===
- The Time Capsule, Coatbridge – has a network of pools, water rides, a whirlpool and an ice rink

=== Wales ===
- Blue Lagoon, Pembrokeshire – an indoor water park
- Cardiff International Pool – part of the Cardiff International Sports Village
- LC, Swansea

== See also ==
- List of water parks
- List of amusement parks in Europe
