= Aqua park =

Aqua park is often used as another name for water park. See Water park for a description of the amusement park on water.

Aqua park may refer to:

- Aqua Park Shinagawa in Japan
- Aqua Park Macedonia in North Macedonia
- Aquapark Tatralandia in Slovakia
- Aquapark di Zambrone in Southern Italy
- Albatros Aqua Park in Egypt
- Aquapark .io Voodoo SAS application game
