= Aquarama =

Aquarama may refer to:

- Riva Aquarama, a speedboat model built by Italian yachtbuilder Riva.
- Aquarama Aquarium Theater of the Sea, an aquarium in South Philadelphia
- SS Aquarama, a passenger ship that operated on the Great Lakes.
- Aquarama Kristiansand, an indoor sports arena in Kristiansand, Norway.
- Aquarama (water park), a water park in Benicàssim, Castelló, Spain
- Aquarama microscope, a Leeuwenhoek microscope by John George Shield in the United Kingdom 1960
