= Aquazone =

Aquazone may refer to:

- Aquazone (theme park), an indoor waterpark in Blanchardstown, Ireland
- Lego Aquazone, a theme for the LEGO building block toy
- Aquazone (software), a series of fishtank simulation video games developed by Smith Micro
- The unrelated Aquazone: Desktop Life series of fishtank simulation video games developed by 9003.inc
