= Watercity =

Water park in Greece

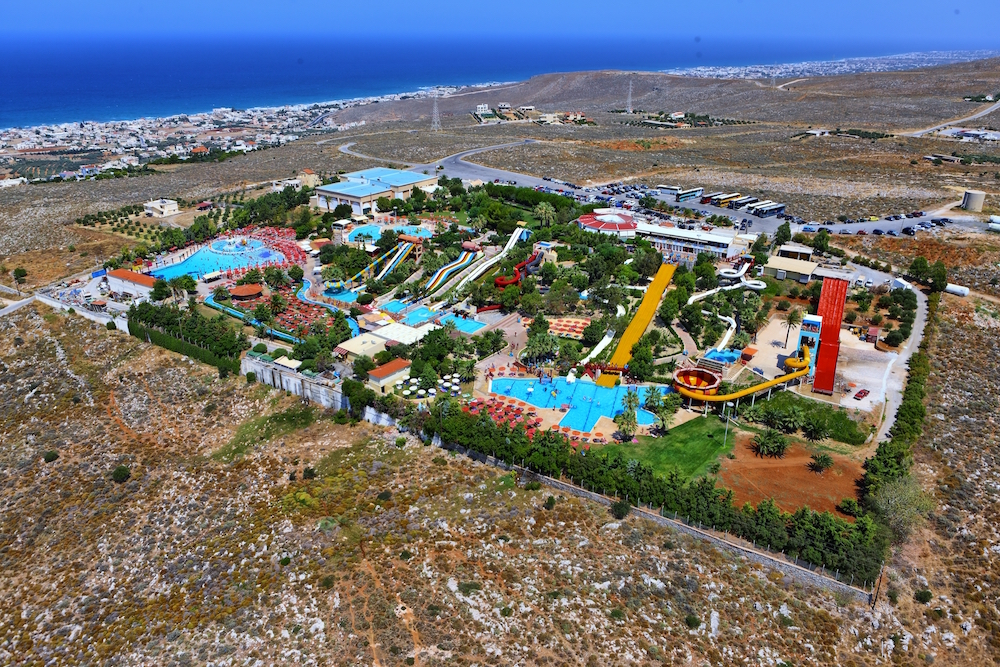
- Interactive map of Watercity
- Slogan: Let's get wet!
- Location: Heraklion, Greece
- Coordinates: 35.311°N 25.250°E
- Area: 80,000 square metres (860,000 sq ft)
- Water slides: 36 water slides
- Website: www.watercity.gr

Watercity is a water park in the area of Anopolis, between Hersonissos and Heraklion on Crete, Greece. It has 36 water games in 87,000 square metres (940,000 sq ft).

It is a member of the World Waterpark Association (WWA).
