= The Wave, Coventry =

English indoor waterpark

Coordinates: 52°24′20.4″N 1°30′39.4″W

The Wave
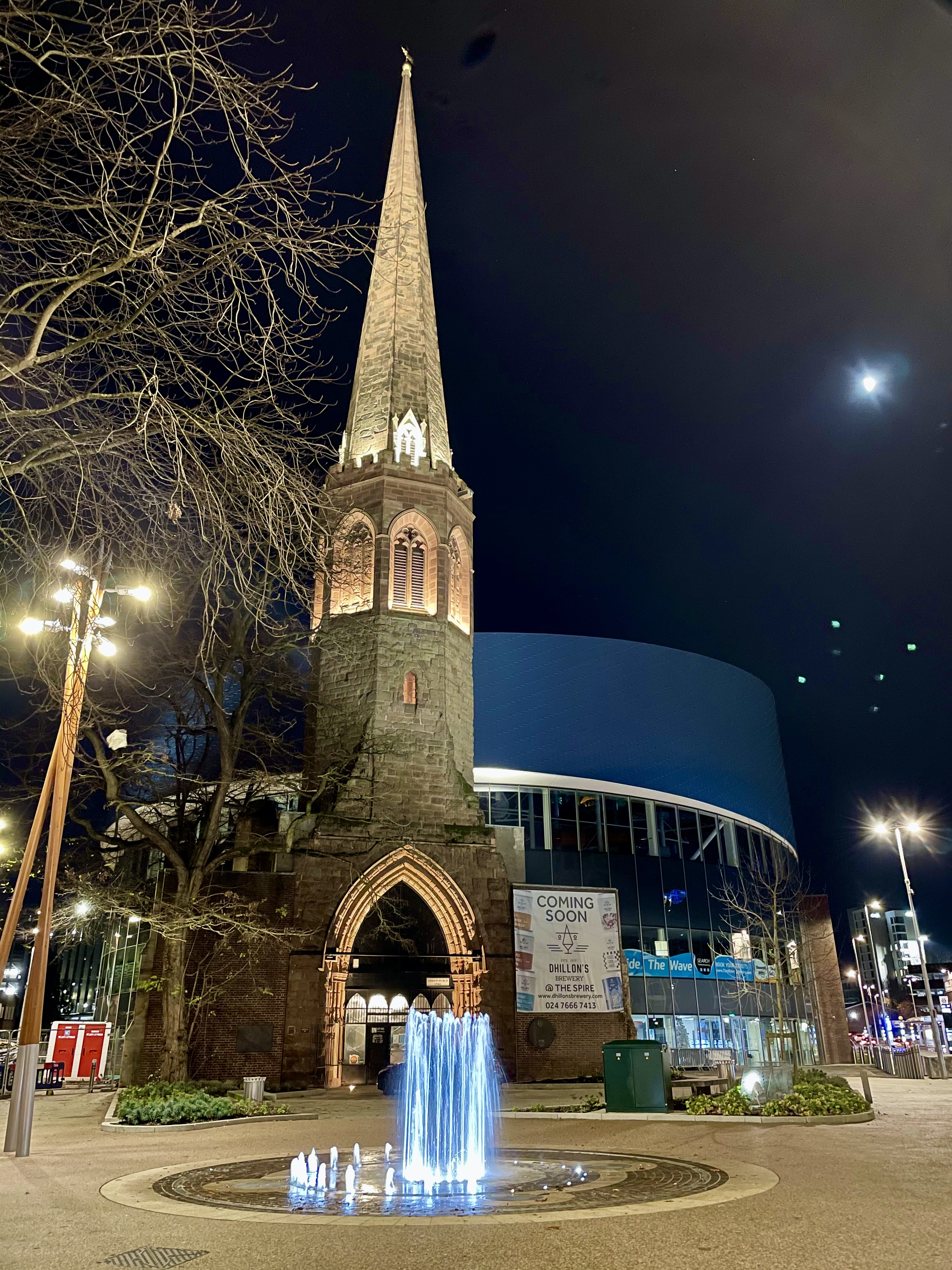
- Interactive map of The Wave
- Location: Coventry, West Midlands, England
- Owner: Coventry City Council
- Opened: 21 October 2019
- Area: West Midlands, England
- Water slides: 6 water slides

The Wave is an indoor waterpark situated in Coventry in the West Midlands, England. The waterpark currently holds the record for the largest wave pool in the UK, at a capacity of 20 million litres. The Wave features six slides of varying intensity and speed, along with a lazy river, wave pool and splash zone - the Reef - which hosts mini slides, jets, a climbing area and a giant tipping bucket.

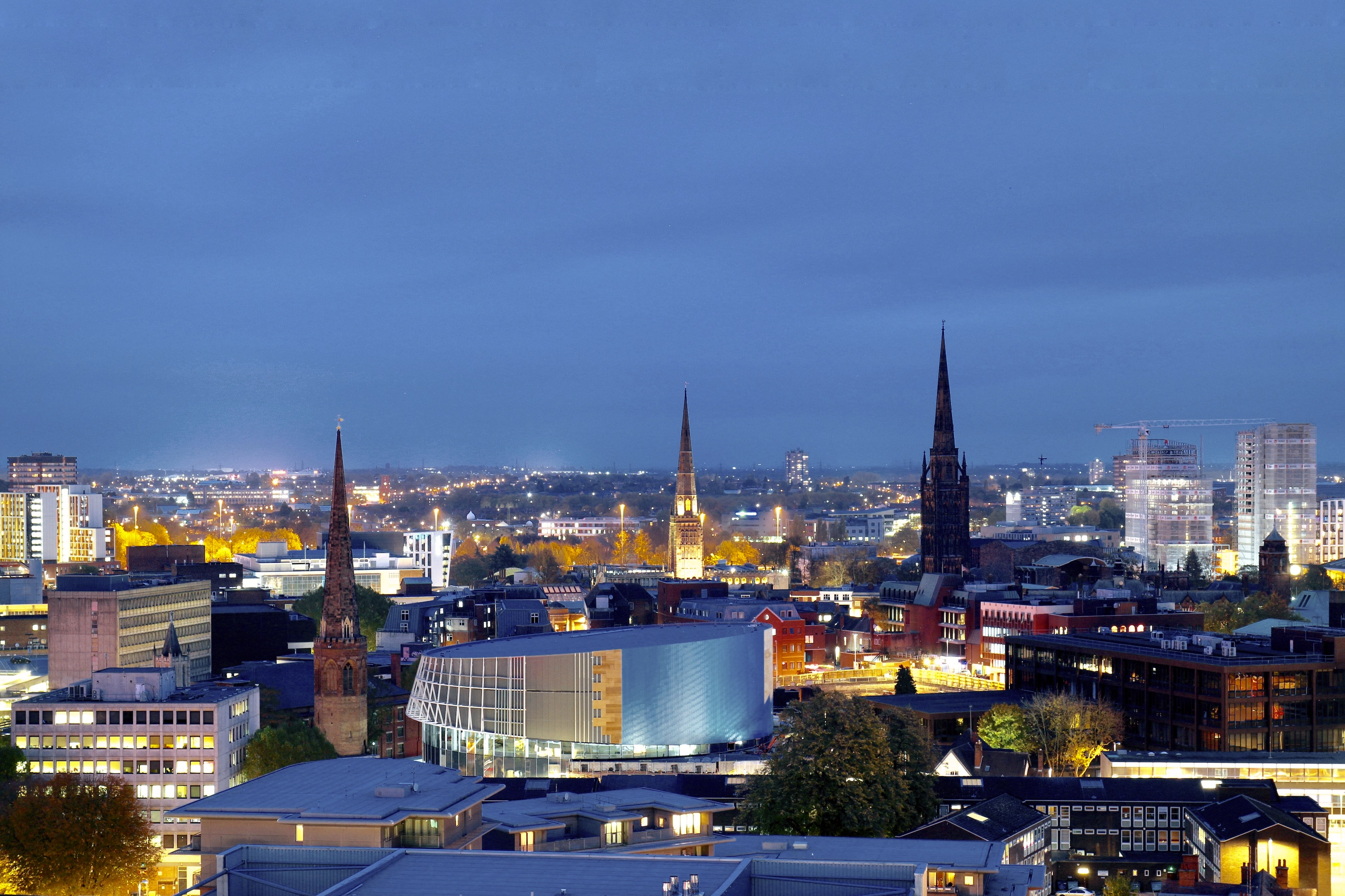
Coventry City Centre in 2018 showing The Wave under construction

The waterpark at The Wave opened in October 2019, while the gym and the spa opened in July 2019. The building cost £36.7 million to build. The Wave has won an award from the World Waterpark Association.

There is also an on-site café, Mana Spa, and state-of-the-art Lifestyles gym available to the public inside The Wave's main building.

== Slides ==
A total of six slides are in operation at The Wave:

Slide	Description
The Cascade	A fully enclosed slide which utilises lighting effects.
The Crestar	A slide which has lighting effects similar to the Cascade, but features two fully lit open spaces along the ride.
The Cyclone	A slide which concludes with a bowl, which riders circle around before leaving through a hole in the centre.
The Rapids	A water coaster, and the longest of the six slides at 174 metres long.
The Riptide	A half-pipe inline tube slide.
The Torrent	A speed slide. This is the tallest slide that begins with riders plunging through a trap door from the highest point in the park. It has been closed for maintenance since late 2022.
