= Terra Natura =

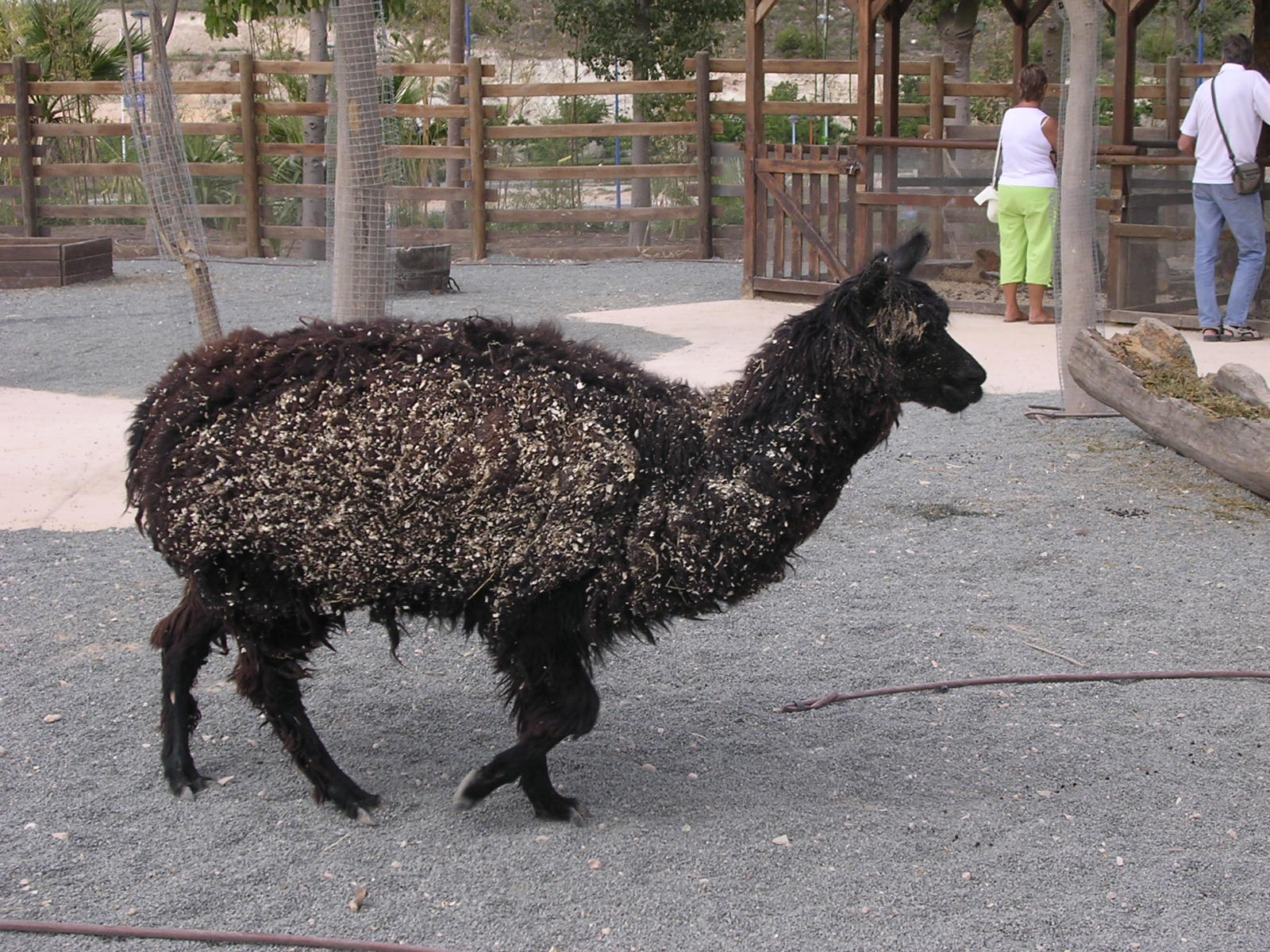
- A llama at the zoo
- Location: Costa Blanca, Spain
- Website: www.terranatura.com/Eng/Inicio/Index.aspx

Terra Natura are two zoo theme parks and aqua parks (Aqua Natura) located near Benidorm (Terra natura Benidorm) and Murcia (Terra Natura Murcia), in the Costa Blanca, Spain.

Terra Natura Animal Parks lets visitors make contact with animals with barriers invisible to the human eye. Many species can be viewed, including elephants, tigers, monkeys, lions, African buffalo, and rhinos.

== Terra Natura Benidorm ==
The 320,000 square metres (79 acres) of Terra Natura Benidorm are divided into four zones or areas: Pangea (the park entrance area), America, Asia and Europe. Between the areas visitors can see about 1500 animals representing 200 species.

== Aqua Natura Benidorm ==
Aqua Natura Benidorm is a 40,000-square-metre (10-acre) water park with a sea lion show where people can enjoy a show and even swim with sea lions, and a large swimming pool area with over 1 kilometre (3,300 ft) of flumes and slides.

== Terra Natura Murcia ==
The 165,445 square metres (40.882 acres) of Terra Natura Murcia are divided into two zones or areas: African Savannah and the Iberian Peninsula. Between the two areas there are about 300 animals representing 50 species.

== Aqua Natura Murcia ==
Aqua Natura Murcia is a 30,000-square-metre (7-acre) water park with an aquarium, and attempts to recreate the Zanzibar archipelago in the Pacific.
