= Aquapark Wrocław =

Water park in Huby, Wrocław, Poland

Coordinates: 51.0910°N 17.0322°E

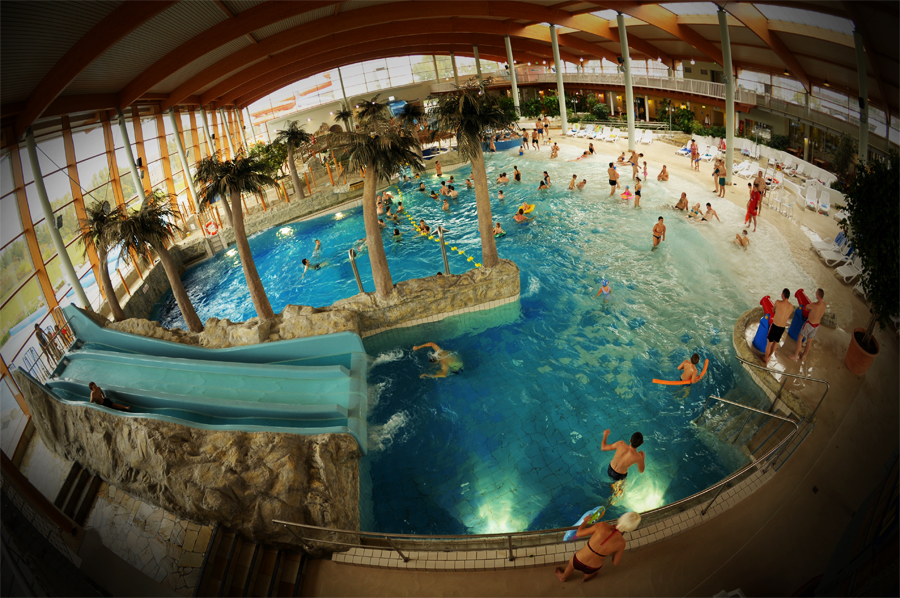
- Interactive map of the Aquapark Wrocław area

General information
- Type: Recreational
- Location: Huby, Wrocław, ul. Borowska 99; 50-558 Wrocław, Poland
- Construction started: 2005
- Completed: 2008
- Owner: Wrocławski Park Wodny S.A.

Website
- https://aquapark.wroc.pl/

Aquapark Wrocław is a Water park in Huby, Wrocław, in the Lower Silesian Voivodeship of Poland.

== Description ==
The complex includes indoor and outdoor recreational pools, an indoor sports pool, a fitness club and saunas, available all year round. Aquapark Wrocław is open 7 days a week.

In 2017, the Aquapark was visited by 1.7 million people. It was the most frequently visited aquapark in Poland and the third in Europe.

== Water park ==
An extensive complex of pools of various depths and temperatures, full of attractions (including slides, a Jacuzzi, a wave pool, a "lazy river", Children's Bay and outdoor pools). A family section with a paddling pool, a pirate ship and a slide has been specially designed for the youngest. The area of the complex is 3558.8 m^{2}.

=== Attractions ===
- Wave pool (temperature 30 °C, depth 0–200 cm)
- Lazy river (temperature 32 °C, depth 70 cm)
- Children's area with swimming pool (temp. 35 °C, depth up to 50 cm) and paddling pool (temp. 35 °C, depth 15 cm), pirate ship and water cannons
- Four Jacuzzis (temperature 35 °C, depth 90 cm)
- Outdoor brine pool (temperature 32 °C, depth 135 cm)
- Outdoor recreational pool (temperature 32 °C, depth 135 cm)
- 35-meter outdoor swimming pool
- Outdoor shower tray
- Swimming pool (temperature 28.5 °C, depth 180 cm to 200 cm and one lane 90 cm deep)

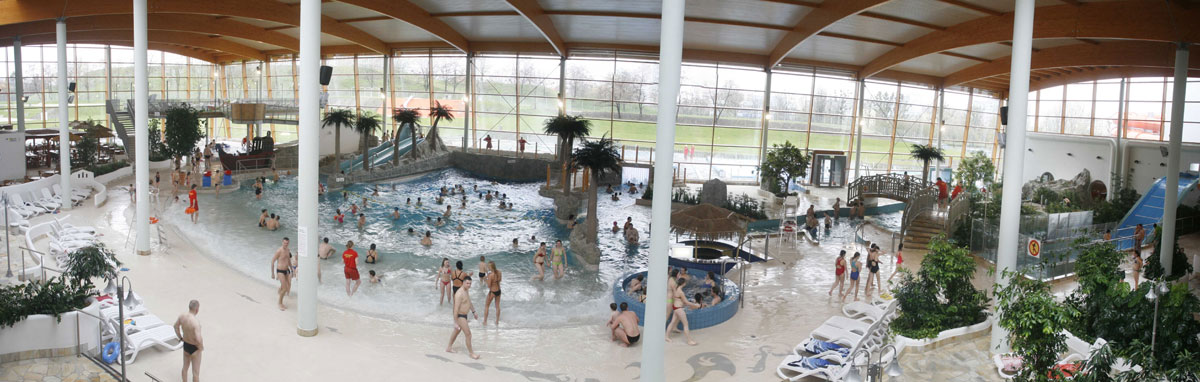
Recreational swimming pool complex

=== Slides ===
- DuoRacer – from 150 cm height, length 131 m
- Cactus – from 120 cm height, length 107 m
- Watermelon – from 120 cm height, length 112 m
- BlueBerry – from 120 cm height, length 136 m
- Lollipop – from 120 cm height, length 82 m
- Wroc-Love – from 120 cm height
- Family slide – from 4 years, length 8 m
- Children's slide – for children under 8 years of age, length 10.5 m
- Rybka – An additional attraction located in the Children's Bay. Its length is 120 cm.

== Children's Bay ==
The zone is fully adapted to conduct activities for the youngest children (from 4 months to 6 years old). Shallow (90 cm) and warm (36 degrees) pool with a total area of 162 m^{2}.

== Gym and fitness ==
Fitness Aquapark Wrocław is one of the most modern clubs in Poland, with a total area of over 1700 m^{2}. The zone includes: a main room equipped with aerobic equipment (32 treadmills, 14 elliptical trainers, 10 bikes, 2 Flex Rider machines, 3 steppers, 2 ergometers) and strength training (20 stations, free weights, Synergy 360), Rowing Zone with 6 rowing ergometers, as well as thematic rooms: IFitness, Fitness and Body&Power.

== Saunarium ==
The zone includes various saunas, as well as the largest sauna garden in Poland, which includes two Finnish saunas - Kelo and Bali, an outdoor pool with cold water and an outdoor pool with heated water and hydromassage. Guests can choose between numerous and varied facilities:

- 4 dry Finnish saunas
- 3 steam baths
- 2 bio saunas
- Stone bath
- Earth sauna
- Finnish sauna with color therapy and aromatherapy
- Infrared sauna
- Thalasso pool
- Outdoor pool with water temperature of 32 degrees Celsius and hydromassage
- 2 lounge rooms

The saunarium is a nude zone and is only for adults.

== Sports pool ==
A modern swimming pool with a length of 25 m and a width of 20 m. Each of the 8 lanes is 2.5 m wide. The depth of the pool is 1.35 m to 1.82 m. There are stands for 120 people. The Sports Pool also hosts aqua fitness and hydrocycling classes.

== Branches of Aquapark Wrocław ==
- Aquapark Brochów (Opened on July 6, 2022)
- Aquapark Zakrzow (Opened on June 21, 2024)
