= Atlantis H2O Aquapark =

Water park in Estonia

Coordinates: 59.5085°N 24.8301°E

- Location: Haabneeme, Viimsi Parish, Estonia
- Opened: 10 August 2015
- Status: Operating
- Water slides: 8 water slides
- Saunas: 11 saunas
- Website: https://aquapark.ee/en/
- facebook: https://www.facebook.com/AtlantisH2OAquapark

Atlantis H2O Aquapark is a water park in Haabneeme in the Viimsi Parish of Estonia.
