= Splash World Southport =

Water park in Southport, Merseyside, England

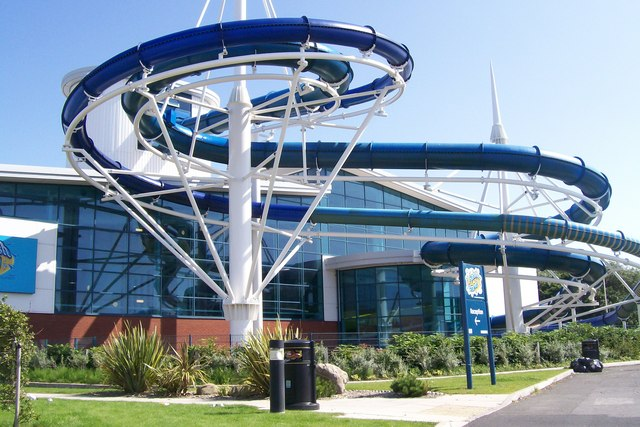
- External view
- Interactive map of Splash World Southport
- Location: Southport, Merseyside, England
- Coordinates: 53.6468°N 3.0171°W
- Opened: 2007
- Website: www.splashworldsouthport.com

Splash World Southport is a water park located in Southport, Merseyside, United Kingdom.

It opened in 2007 and was rebuilt in a rebuilding project delayed by the COVID pandemic, reopening in 2023.
