= Praia de São Rafael =

Beach in Portugal

- Beach
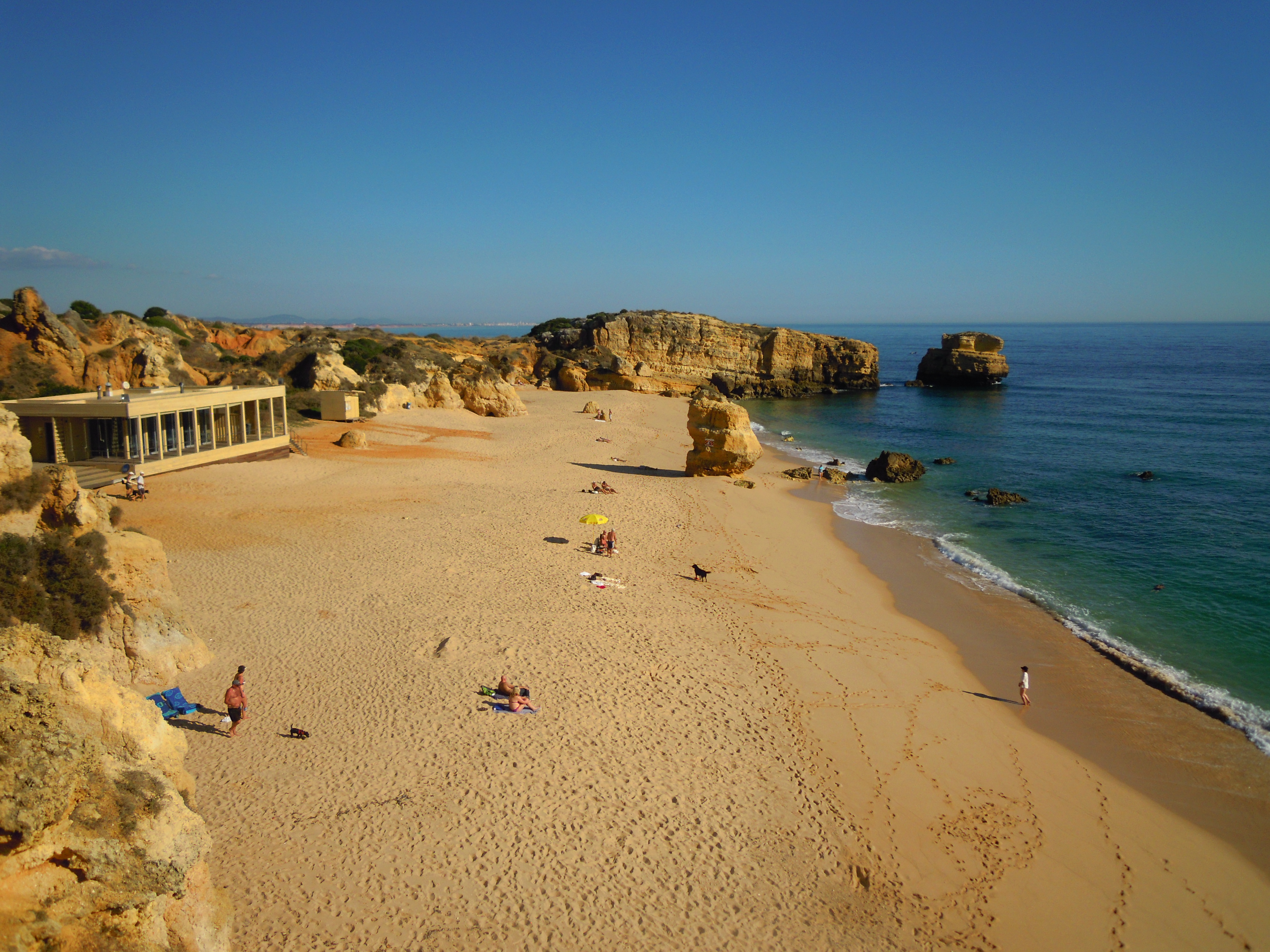
- Praia de São Rafael

- Location within Portugal
- Coordinates: 37°4′29.03″N 8°16′53.41″W
- Location: Albufeira, Algarve, Portugal

Praia de São Rafael is a beach on the Atlantic south coast of the Algarve, close to the village resort of Sesmarias which is within the Municipality of Albufeira, Portugal. This beach is located 2.5 miles (4.0 km) by road to the west of Albufeira old town centre and is 29.7 miles (47.8 km) west of the regions capital of Faro. This beach is one of sixty nine blue flag beaches (2012) in the Algarve and is accredited with good facilities for disabled people.

== Description ==
This small beach has fine gold sand and crystal clear water and is backed by golden limestone cliffs. On the beach itself there are many limestone rock formations which have been eroded over a long period of time to form interesting formations and shapes many of which have names such as Ninho das Andorinhas or the Swallow’s Nest and Ponte Pequena or the Small Bridge. The main beach can get very crowded during the peak summer period but there are some quieter spots around the beach amongst the rock formations a short distance from the main sandy areas. The beach has good facilities with toilets and public showers. During the summer season the beach is patrolled by lifeguards. There are Loungers, parasols and Pedalo's which can be hired. The beach has good access for disabled people having boardwalks and paved slopes running down to the beach from the car park to the rear of the beach.

=== Car Park ===
To the back of the beach there is a car park of which some places there are allocated parking bays for disabled drivers displaying a European blue badge. Parking can prove very difficult during the busy summer months as numbers are restricted so as not to weaken the cliffs. From the car park there are paths and boardwalk down to, and along the beach which provides easy access for wheelchair users.

== Gallery ==
Praia de São Rafael

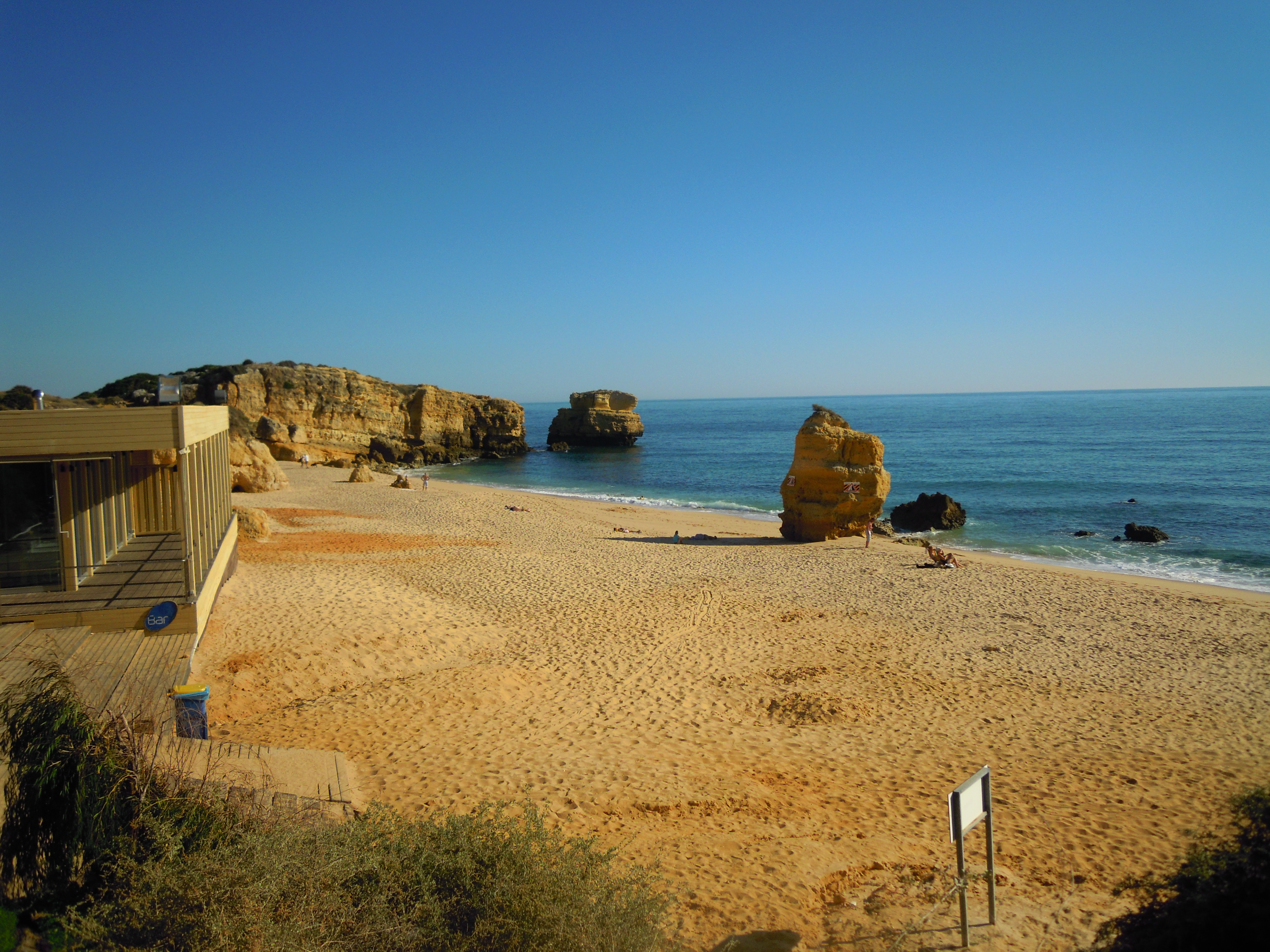
Beach and the Bar - restaurant on the right of the photograph.

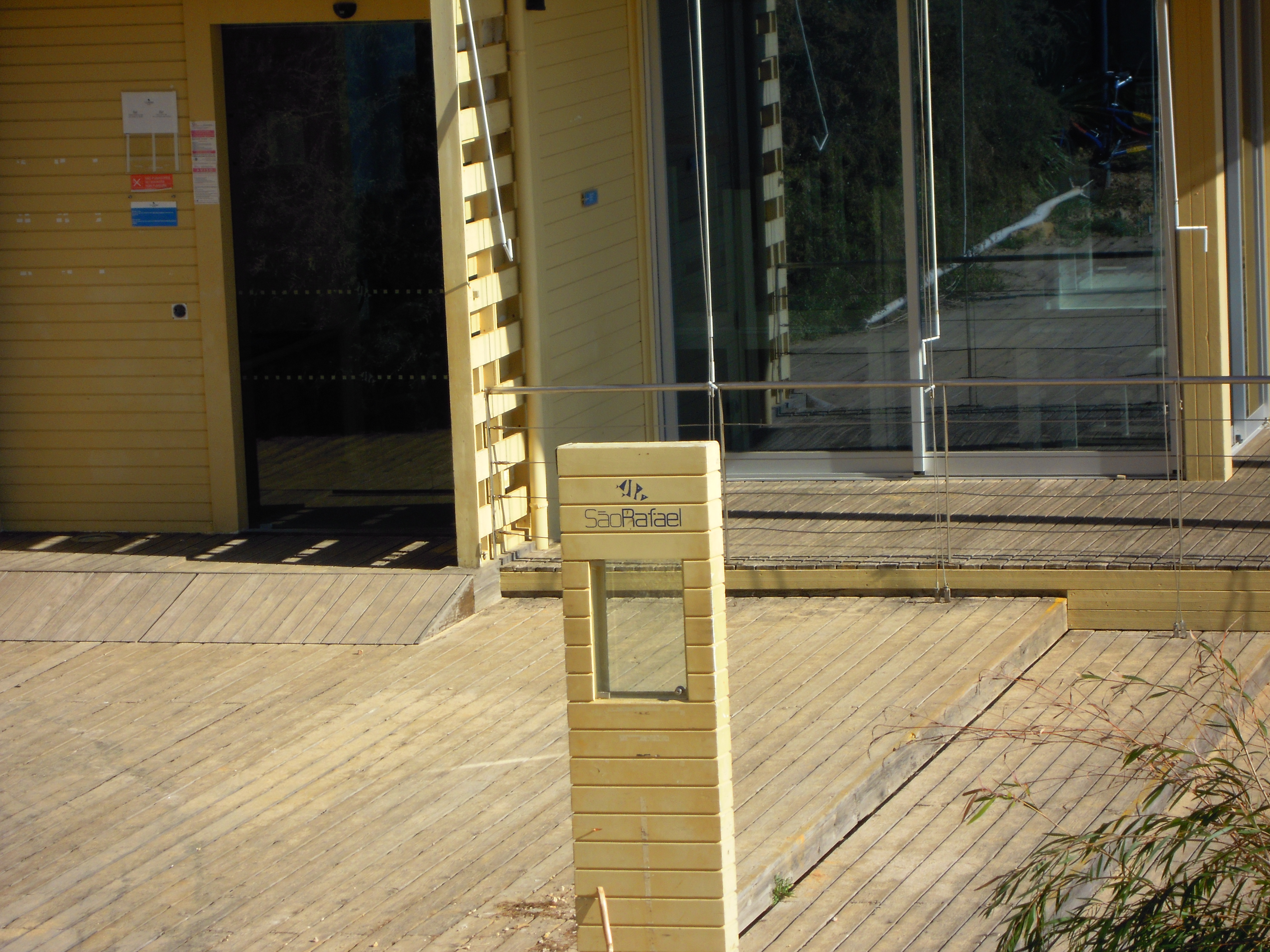
Board walk around the restaurant

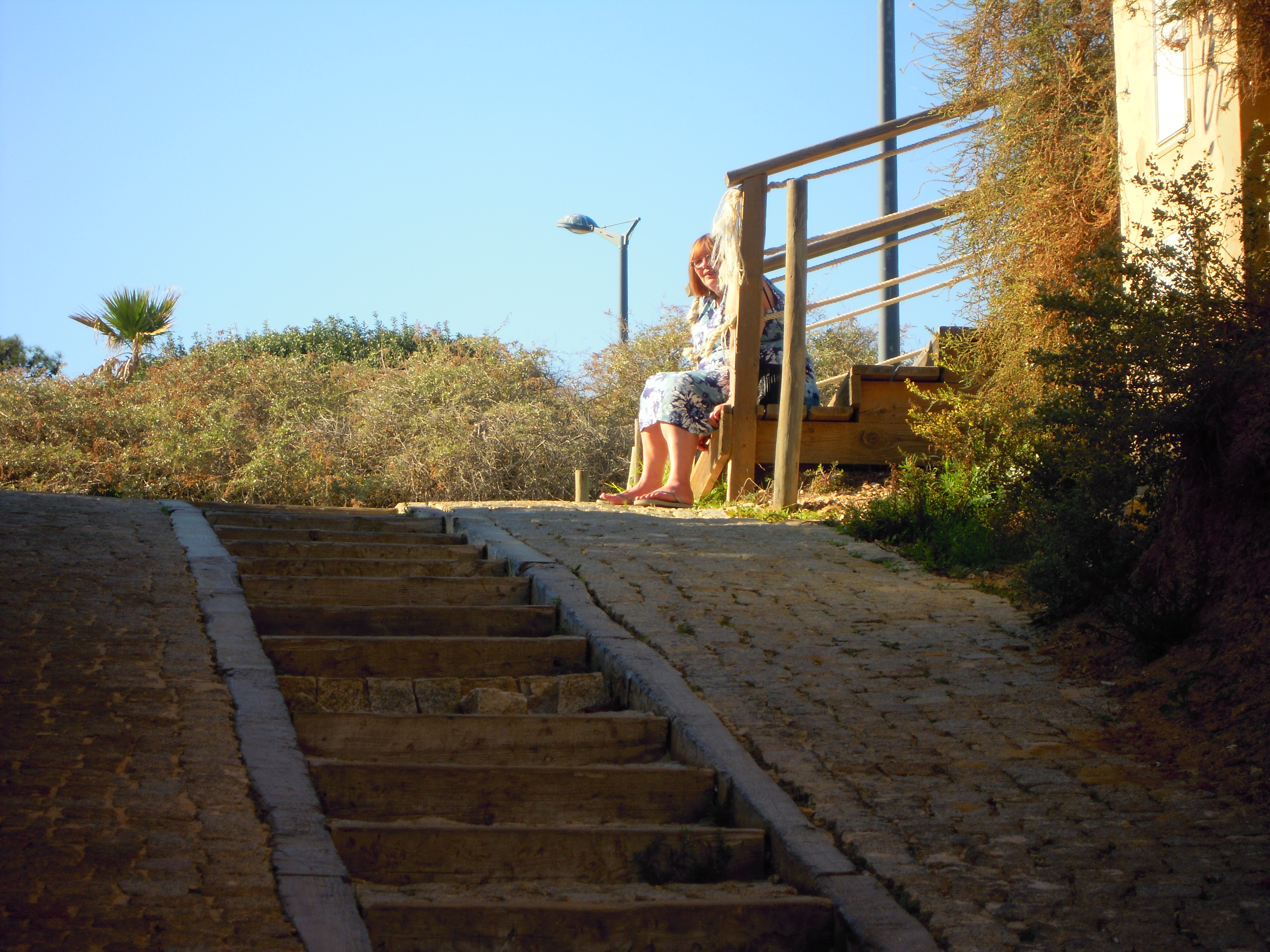
The access slope down to the beach.
