= Fasouri Watermania =

Water park in Cyprus

Fasouri Watermania Waterpark
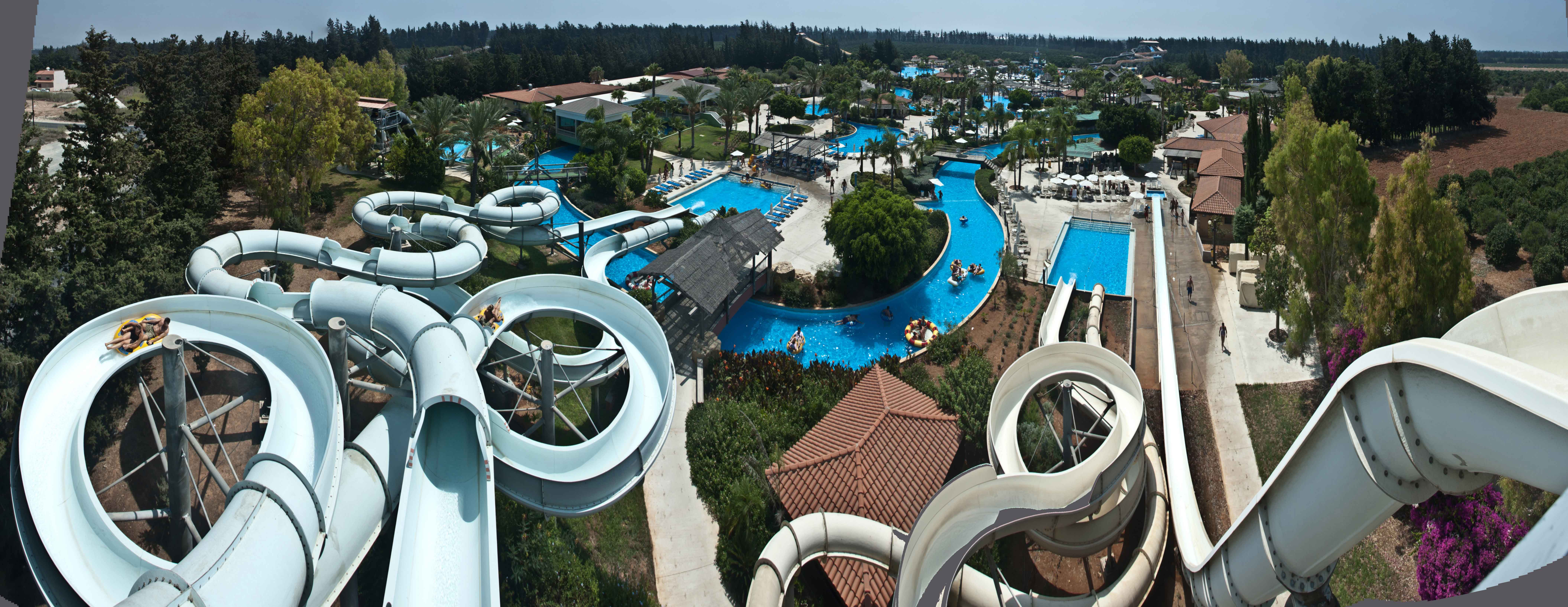
- Interactive map of Fasouri Watermania Waterpark
- Location: Fasouri, Limassol, Cyprus
- Coordinates: 34°39′08″N 32°58′30″E
- Opened: 1999
- Area: +100,000 square metres (25 acres)
- Water slides: 30 water slides

Fasouri Watermania Waterpark is a water park located in Fasouri, a village in the municipality of Limassol, Cyprus. As of 2025, it is the biggest waterpark on the island.

== Operations ==
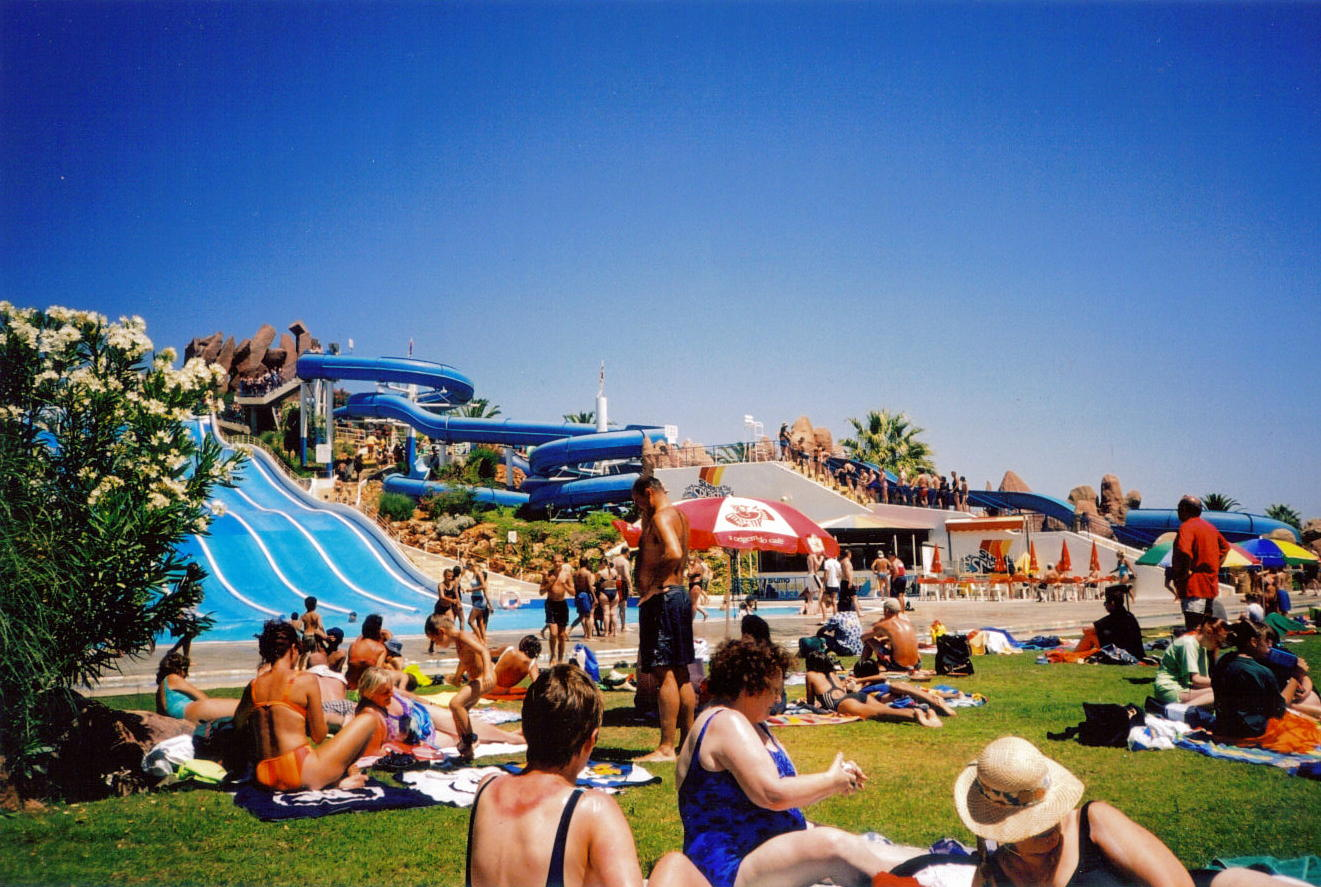
View in 2001

In 1999, Fasouri Watermania started its operation for the first time on a 56,000 square metres (14 acres) land. All construction was carried out having the protection of the environment in mind at all times. All equipment has been supplied by well-known international manufacturers and no aspects of safety were left to chance. The park has gone through several expansions in 2000, 2003 and 2007. It is currently taking over 100,000 square metres (25 acres) and has a number of attractions and facilities for all ages, including 2 restaurants, 3 snack bars and 2000 sunbeds. The park is themed as a Polynesian island to provide a more tropical ambiance. Thousands of locals and tourists visit every year.

== Location ==
Fasouri Watermania is located in the area of Fasouri Village, about 15 minutes outside of Limassol’s city center and about 10 minutes off the Limassol-Paphos Highway.

== Awards ==
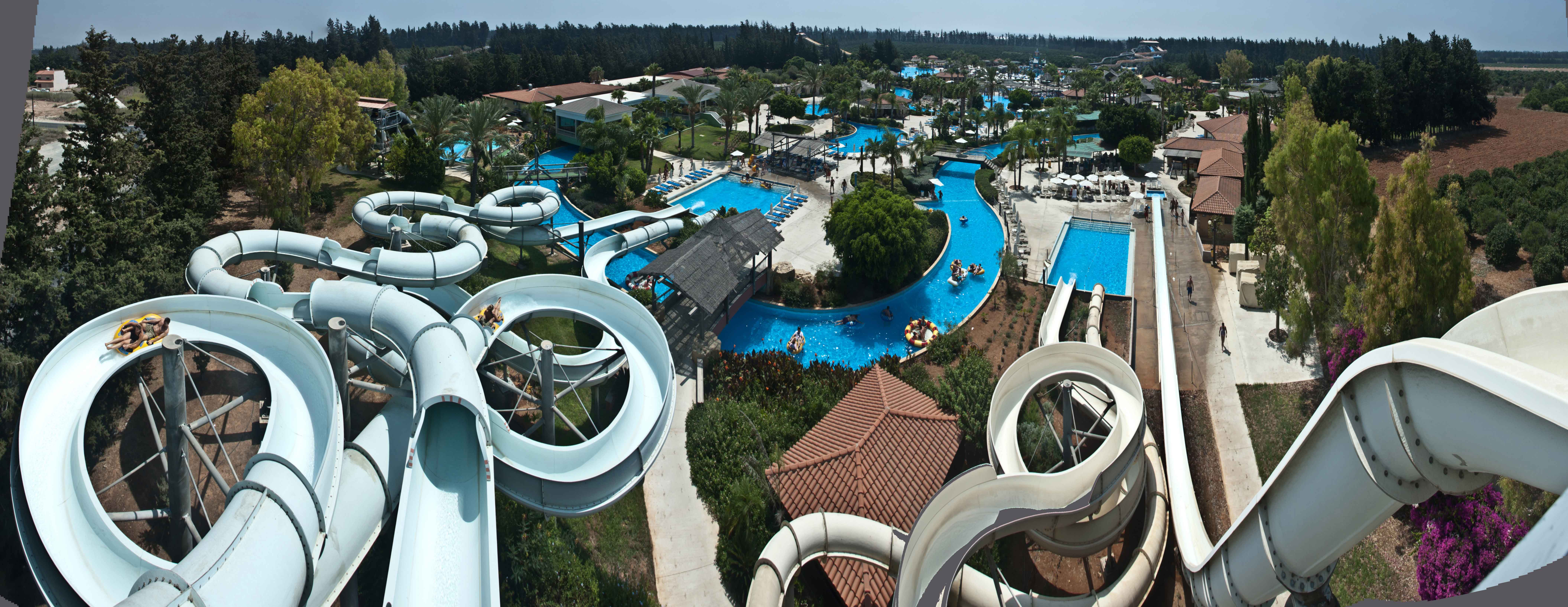
Water slide

- Awarded Europe's Leading Waterpark Attraction for the 2007 World Travel Awards.
- Carries a Certificate of Excellence from TripAdvisor.
- Awarded Traveler’s Choice Attraction for 2012, 2013, 2014 and 2016
- Awarded 3rd Best Waterpark in Europe for 2015

== History ==
The vision of the Waterpark was born In 1998 while Fasouri Waterpark was launched in 1999 as Fasouri Watermania Waterpark. It is owned by Heaven’s Garden Waterpark Ltd, a member of the Lanitis Group of Companies. It was designed, developed and landscaped to blend harmoniously with a 105,000 square metres citrus grove garden. It is presently the biggest water park in Cyprus both in size and facilities. The park only closes due to bad weather conditions.
