= Hidropark (water park) =

Water park in Spain

- Location: Alcúdia, Majorca, Spain
- Coordinates: 39.84147°N 3.11490°E
- Pools: 2 pools
- Water slides: 6 water slides
- Children's areas: 2 children's areas
- Website: hidroparkalcudia.com/home/

Hidropark is a water park, located in Alcúdia, Majorca, Spain. Besides water slides and trampolines.
