= Tervise Paradiis =

Water park and spahotel in Pärnu, Estonia

Coordinates: 58°22′24″N 24°30′39″E

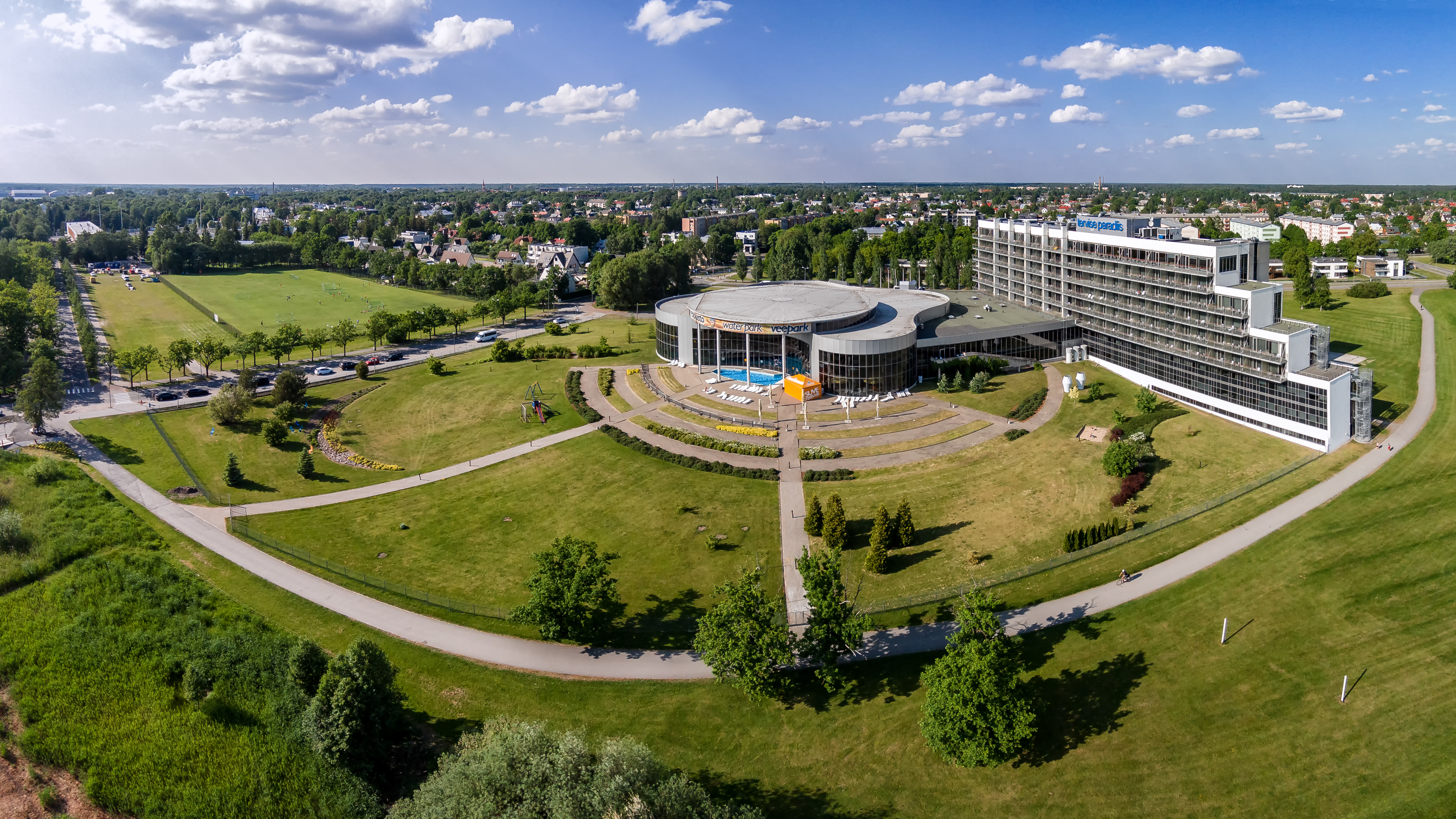
Tervise Paradiis Water Centre

Tervise Paradiis ('Health Paradise') is a water park and spa hotel in the beach area of Pärnu, Estonia.

The facility was opened in 2004. The Tervise Paradiis complex features a four-star hotel with accommodations for 244 guests, a therapy department providing spa treatments and relaxation services, Estonia's largest water park, a 25-meter swimming pool, an aerobics gym, a fitness center, a bowling alley, several bars and restaurants, seminar facilities, and a shop.

The water park in Tervise Paradiis is the largest water park in Estonia. Besides other attractions, the water park has 5 different slides. The longest slide is tube slide, with the length of 100 m. The centre has also 4-metre diving platform and rapid mountain river.
