= Aquarama (water park) =

Spanish water park

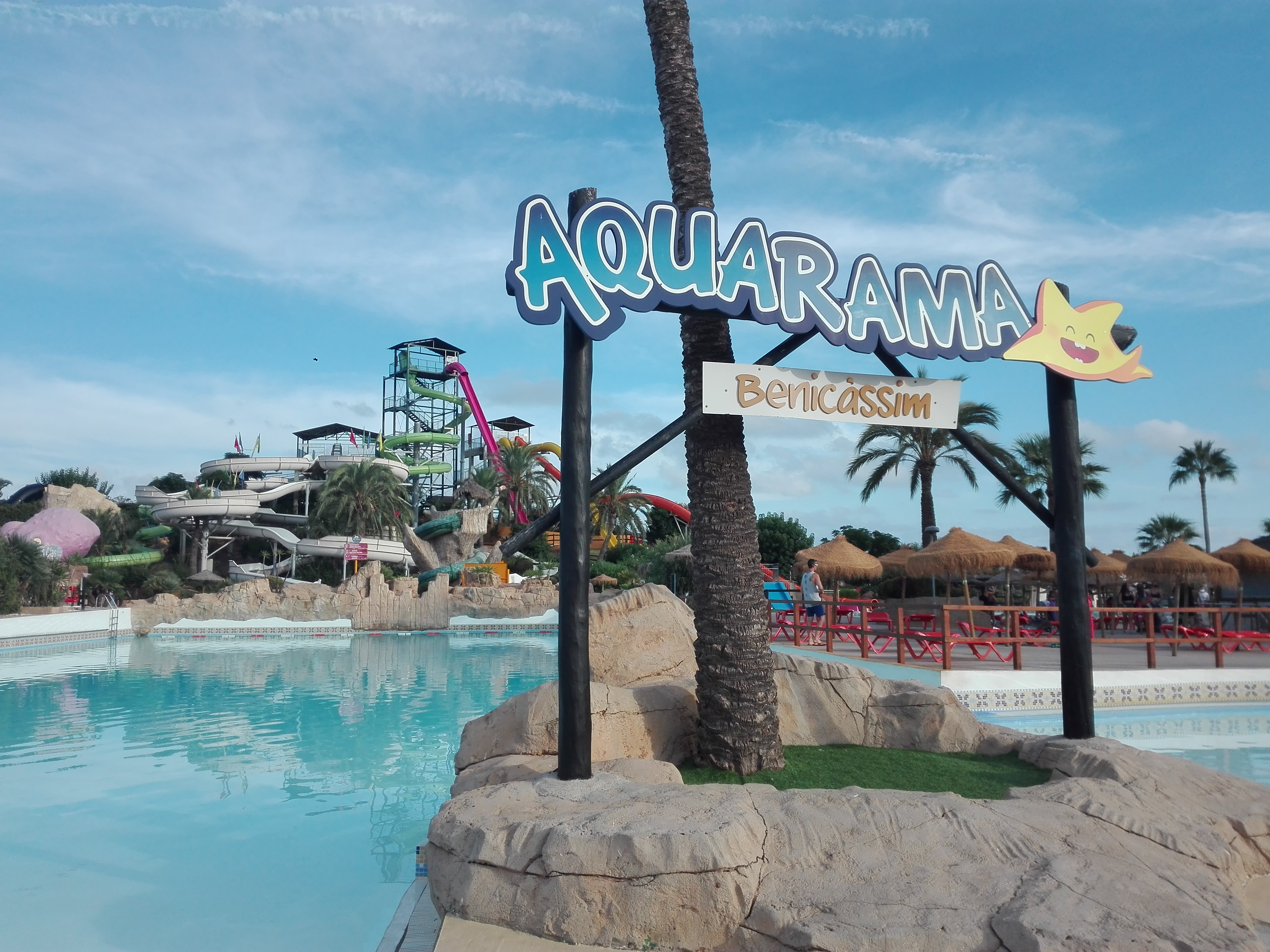
- Location: Benicàssim, Castelló, Spain
- Coordinates: 40.04799°N 0.05139°E
- Area: 45,000 m2
- Pools: 2 pools
- Water slides: 17 water slides
- Children's areas: 2 children's areas
- Website: www.aquarama.net

Aquarama is a water park, located in Benicàssim, Castelló, Spain. The park has the eleventh-highest slide in the world named The Devil's Drop together with The Beast in Western Water Park.
