= Water World Lloret =

Large water park in Spain

Water World
- Interactive map of Water World
- Slogan: 'The best water park in the Costa Brava' (English website)
- Location: Lloret de Mar, Girona, Spain
- Coordinates: 41°42′27″N 2°49′39″E
- Opened: 1985; 41 years ago
- Operating season: May–September (roughly)
- Status: Operating
- Pools: 3 pools
- Water slides: 16 water slides
- Children's areas: 3 children's areas
- Website: https://waterworld.es

Water World is a large water park on the outskirts of Lloret de Mar in the province of Girona, Spain. The park opened in 1985, and since opening it has operated 16 water slides, with at least six being opened after the park's opening. In addition, it offers extensive facilities throughout the park. It is one of the oldest water parks in Spain.

== Description ==
Water World opened on 12 July 1985 as one of Spain's first water parks. Water World's first major new waterslide opening came in 1997, when Water Mountain, a water coaster, opened. This was followed in 2002 by two more waterslides, Storm and X-Trem Mountain. In 2024, Water World launched Tornado Land, a kid-friendly area, which was followed by Tornado King, its largest water slide to date, in 2025.

Water World operates three standard pools, named Family Lagoon, The Calm and The Bay, in the western area of the park, in addition to a wave pool in the east and a pool at the Tornado Land children's area into which its eight slides empty. There are many food and drink outlets at the park, including La Piazza, which sells confectionery, Captain Hook which sells fast food and a main Les Terrasses restaurant in the centre of the park. Water World offers a Fast Pass that allows people to skip the queues of popular waterslides, for example Tornado King or Water Mountain. There are two varieties of the pass: one that allows a single use on each eligible waterslide and another that allows unlimited access to each waterslide.

Magazine Sur in English commented that Water World was "one of Spain's best water parks" and "a favourite of foreign tourists", noting that 60% of its visitors come from outside Spain. Additionally, Europe This Way noted the park "makes for a great day out with children". Camping website Cala Llevado recommended the park, saying that some of the attractions are "truly exceptional" and naming the Storm water slide the "standout attraction".

Water World operates 16 water slides:

| Legend: | Kids | Family | Thrill rides |

Water slides at Water World Lloret
| Slide | Description | Opened |
|---|---|---|
| Tornado King | 5-seater tube slide. Features 2 half-pipes. Opened in 2025 and is the first of its kind in Europe. | 2025 |
| Tornado Land | Children's area containing eight water slides. | 2024 |
| X-Trem Mountain | 2-seater tube water coaster, more severe than similar Water Mountain. Previously Water Mountain before switching names c.2024. | 2002 |
| Rafting River | 4-seater tube slide which is partially a dark slide. | Unknown |
| Kamikazes | Pair of steep body slides. | Unknown |
| Storm | Pair of body slides. Both feature a bowl and drop into water. | 2002 |
| Water Mountain | 2-seater tube water coaster, less severe than similar X-Trem Mountain. Previously X-Trem Mountain before switching names c.2024. | 1997 |
| Python | Body slide, part of a set of 3, and the most severe of the 3. | Unknown |
| Mamba | Body slide, part of a set of 3, more severe than Nauyaca but less severe than Python. | Unknown |
| Nauyaca | Body slide, part of a set of 3, and the least severe of the 3. | Unknown |
| Racing Slides | 4-lane body slide. | Unknown |
| Wild River | Collection of body slides, joined by small pools. An example of a "crazy river". | Unknown |
| Fun River | 1-seater tube slide, part of a set of 2 made for kids. | Unknown |
| Baby River | 1-seater tube slide, part of a set of 2 made for kids. | Unknown |
| Speed Furious | Body slide with a drop-launch capsule. | Unknown |
| Hurricanes | Pair of 2-seater tube slides with a steep drop. | Unknown |
| Speed Slides | 6-lane mat racer slide. | Unknown |
