= Aquacolors =

Water park in Croatia

Coordinates: 45.1983°N 13.6052°E

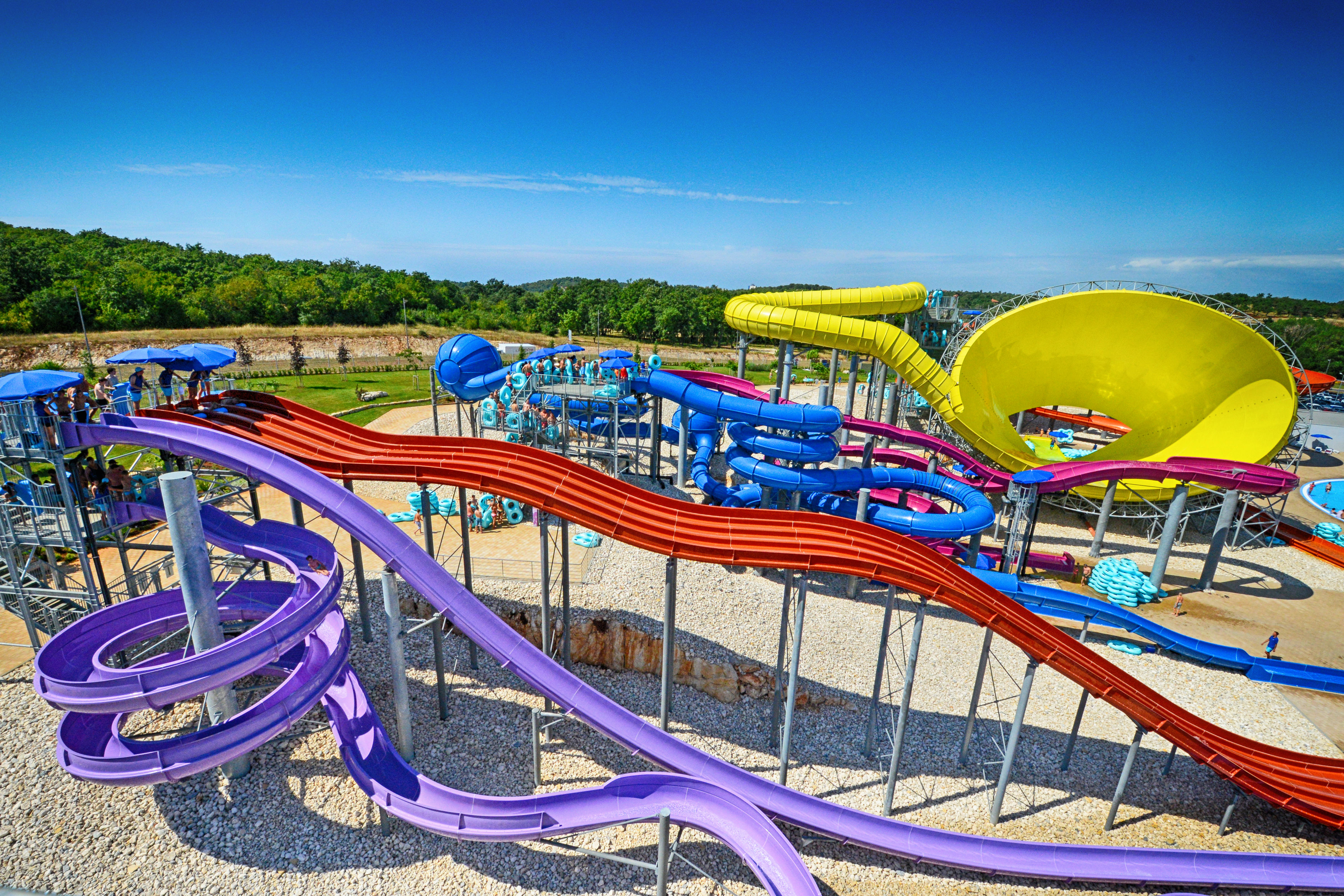
Aquacolors in 2015

Aquacolors is a waterpark near the town of Poreč in Croatia.

== Overview ==
Opened in May 2015, its construction covers 10 hectares and cost roughly 25 million euro. It's considered one of the largest waterparks in southeast Europe, and includes attractions such as water slides, a wave pool, lazy river and kids corner.
