= Alpamare Scarborough =

Water park in Scarborough, England

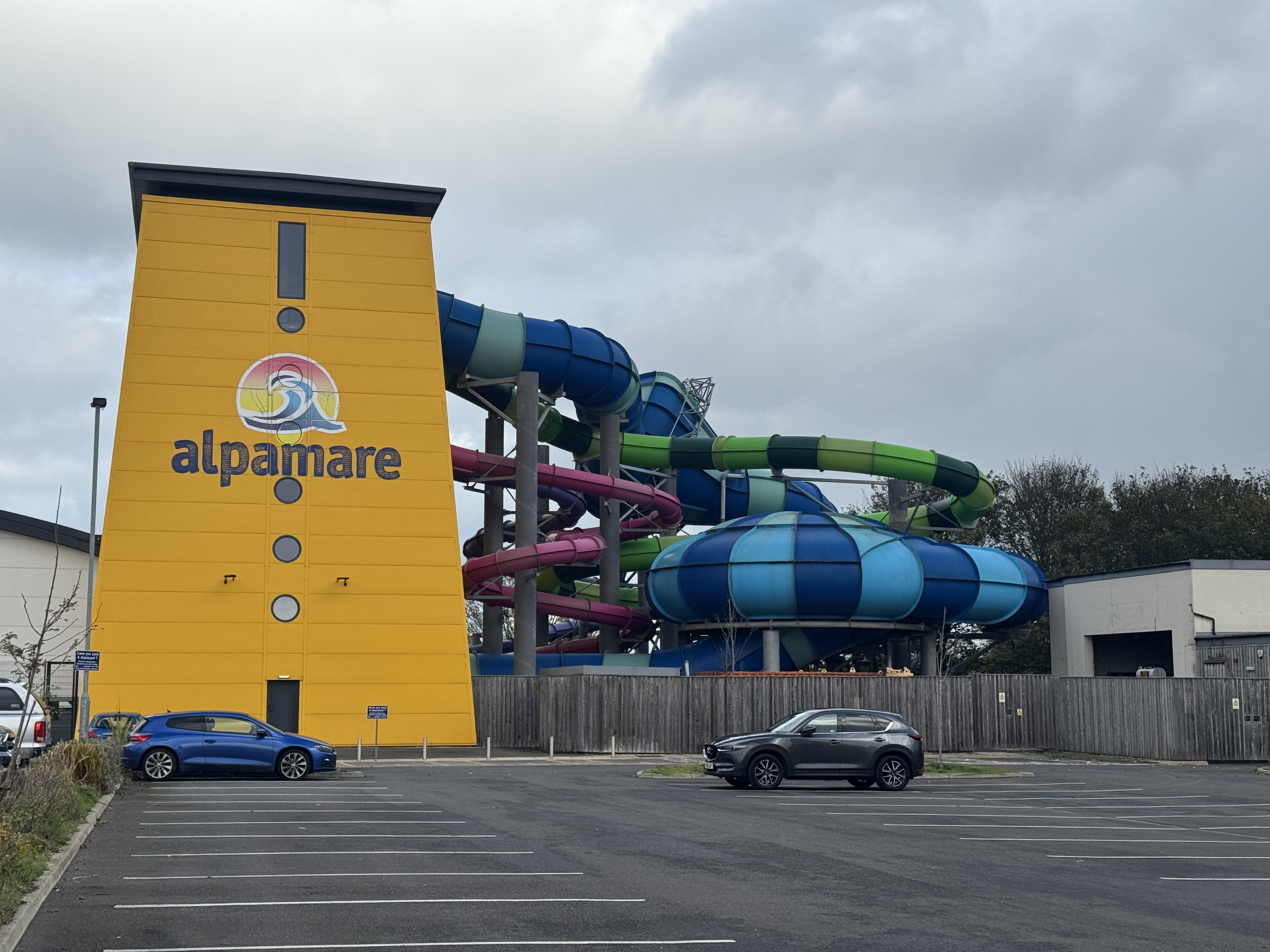
- Outside view
- Interactive map of Alpamare Scarborough
- Location: Scarborough, North Yorkshire, UK
- Coordinates: 54.296°N 0.413°W
- Opened: 2016
- Website: https://alpamare.co.uk/

Alpamare is an indoor water park in Scarborough, England, UK. The park features 4 water slides and a spa named Wellness at Alpamare. It opened in 2016 and was acquired by Gordon Gibb, owner of Flamingo Land, in 2024.

== History ==
Planning permission for the park was granted in 2012 as part of a development called The Sands located in Scarborough's North Bay. In July 2016 it was announced that the park would be opening on 28 July, however, the opening was delayed. It instead opened on 30 July 2016. The Wellness at Alpamare spa opened in 2019.

The water park closed temporarily in October 2023 and two months later was taken over by North Yorkshire Council after the operator Benchmark Leisure Ltd went into administration.

After taking possession of Alpamare in December 2023, North Yorkshire Council sought a short-term operator to reopen the waterpark for the 2024 summer season. In May 2024, the council selected Flamingo Land Resorts Limited, the operator of Flamingo Land Resort, as its preferred bidder and subsequently entered into a 12-month lease, with an option for a further 12-month extension.

Alpamare reopened to the public on 24 July 2024 following refurbishment and preparation work by the council and Flamingo Land.

In February 2025, the council included Alpamare in a wider soft-market testing exercise examining the long-term future of Scarborough's North Bay. The exercise also covered several neighbouring council-owned development sites and was intended to assess potential commercial and regeneration options.

By March 2026, the council had begun exploring a possible freehold sale of Alpamare as an operational waterpark. A request for proposals was issued to five specialist leisure agents seeking potential strategies for the site. The council said proposals could also include nearby undeveloped land where this would help support the waterpark's long-term financial viability and the wider leisure offer in North Bay.

Flamingo Land's lease was due to expire on 31 October 2026. The council stated that the agreement could potentially be extended by mutual consent while longer-term options were considered, and that any preferred disposal or redevelopment proposal would require further appraisal and approval.

== Facilities ==
The park contains four waterslides, an indoor wave pool, two outdoor pools, a restaurant and bar, and a spa named Wellness at Alpamare.
