= Aquazone (theme park) =

Indoor waterpark in County Dublin

Aquazone Waterpark
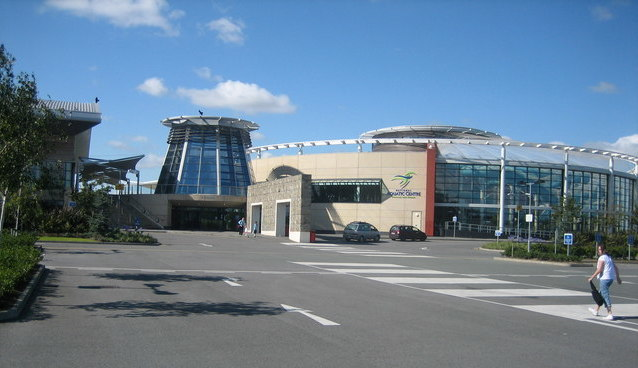
- National Aquatic Centre entrance
- Interactive map of Aquazone Waterpark
- Location: Blanchardstown, Dublin, Ireland
- Coordinates: 53.3971°N 6.3701°W
- Opened: 2003 (as Dublin Waterworld)
- Previous names: Dublin Waterworld
- Operating season: all-year
- Water slides: 3 water slides
- Website: https://www.aquazone.ie

Aquazone is an indoor waterpark in Blanchardstown, County Dublin. The waterpark is located in the National Aquatic Centre.

== Rides ==
The park is home to three water slides (Dark Hole, Green Giant & Master Blaster), a surfing-machine (Flow-Rider), a pirate ship (for children under 5), a lazy river and a large pool that generates waves.

== Legal cases ==
After a lengthy legal process, the Irish government through its company Campus & Stadium Ireland Development (CSID), won a High Court case to repossess the centre due to failure of Dublin Waterworld to pay any rent. CSID also alleged that the NAC was not being properly maintained. This was held by the commercial court not to be the case.

The result of this case was appealed by the Dublin Waterworld and the Supreme Court hearing was scheduled for 14 November 2006, Dublin Waterworld losing and handing back possession.

== See also ==
- Funtasia
