= Aqua Park Macedonia =

Water park in Macedonia

- Location: Probištip, North Macedonia
- Coordinates: 42.005446634425354°N 22.175981284348936°E
- Area: 18,000 m^{2} (190,000 sq ft)
- Website: Aqua Park Macedonia - Probistip (in Macedonian)

The Aqua Park "Macedonia" (Macedonian: Аква парк "Македонија", Akva park "Makedonija") is a water park in Probištip, North Macedonia. It has an area of 18,000 m^{2}. It has a many types of pools with many features.
