= Aquapark Tatralandia =

Water park in Slovakia

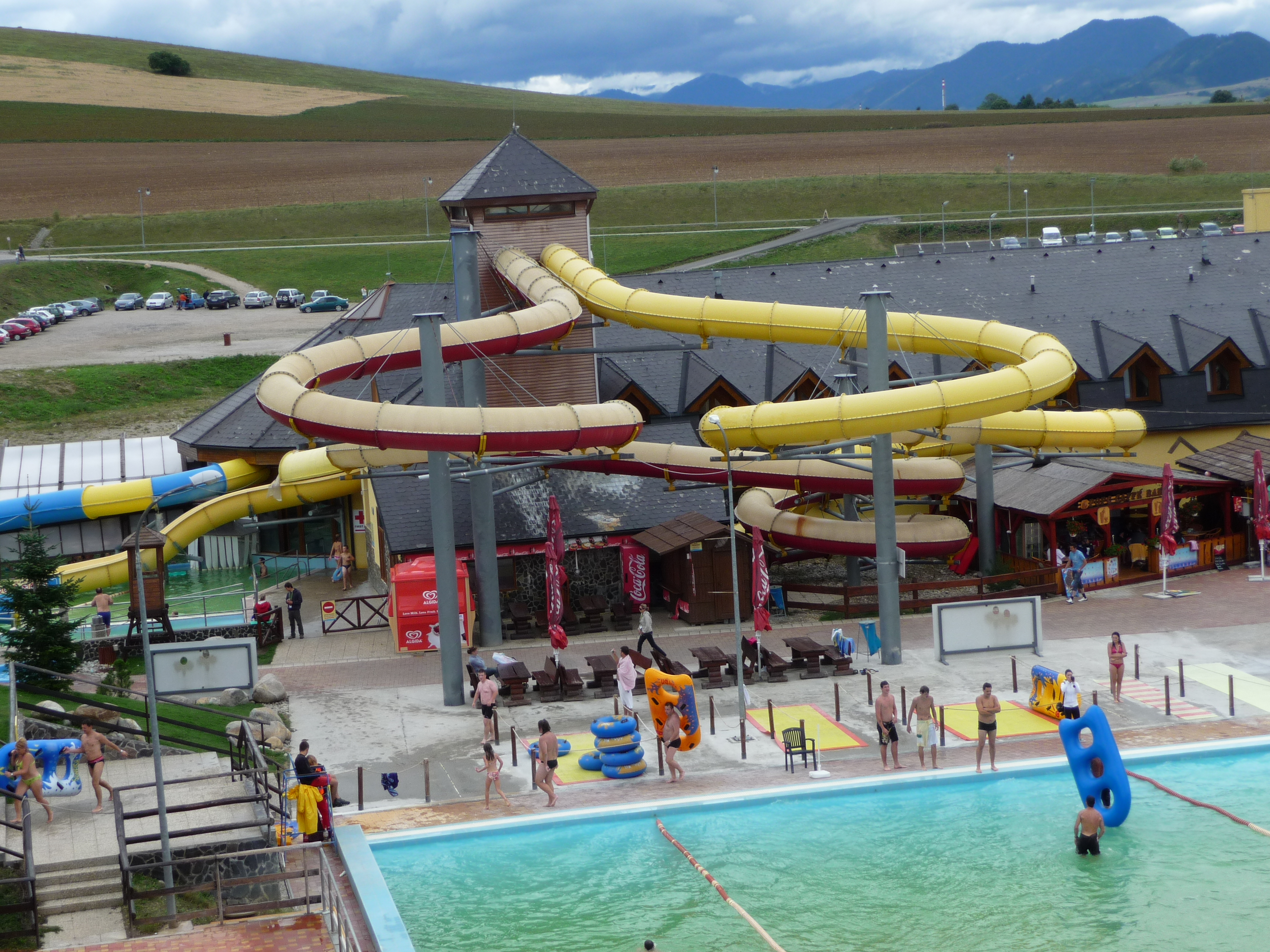
- Interactive map of Aquapark Tatralandia
- Location: Liptovsky Mikulas, Slovakia
- Coordinates: 49.105996°N 19.570427°E
- Opened: 5 July 2003
- Slogan: Tatralandia Waterpark offers both indoor and outdoor fun the entire year!
- Operating season: June – August
- Website: http://www.tatralandia.sk

Aquapark Tatralandia Holiday Resort is the biggest aqua-park in Slovakia and one of the biggest in Central Europe. It is located 4 km north-west from town Liptovský Mikuláš in Ráztoky, on the north bank of dam Liptovská Mara. The source of the thermal water is a mineral spring coming from a 2500m deep bore with temperature of 60.7 °C. There are 9 thermal pools, 6 of them are open all year-round; while 2 of them are covered, with water temperature around 38 °C. Located in the close proximity of the Tatra Mountains, the waterpark resort is open daily from 10am-10pm, and is open most of the year.

== History ==
Construction began on 14 November 2002, and Tatralandia Aquapark first opened its doors on 5 July 2003. In 2004 Tatralandia added Celtic saunas, 3 new pools, and another 9 toboggans and slides. The original number of visitors increased from 2,500 to 4,000. In July 2005 a Western City theme area was opened, and attendance increased to 570,000 visitors. In 2006 Bubble City and Adventure Castle were added (a complex of castles and other inflatables). In 2007 a new indoor tropical complex, called Pirates of the Caribbean, was added, along with a Palm Beach relaxation area. After making numerous improvements in 2008, a Tornado raft slide was added in 2009, as well as a 5D Cinema.

== Attractions ==
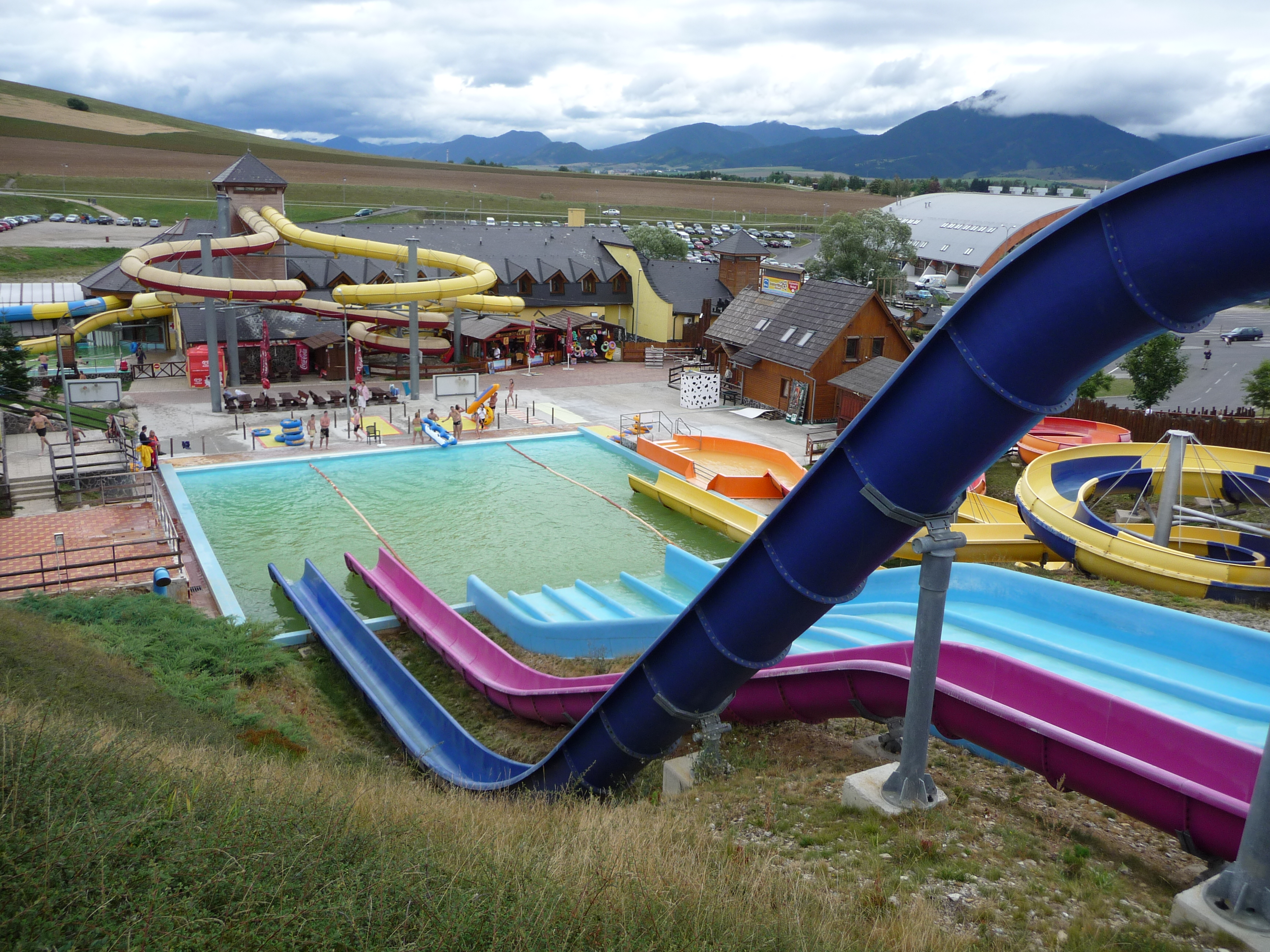
Aquapark Tatralandia

- 8 year-round pools, including a water mushroom, water jets, water swing, water basketball, volleyball, aqua aerobic, water competition ...
- 3 summer pools – children pool, swimming pool and a pool with 21 attractions
- 29 tube tracks and slides, including a Boomerang Raft Ramp, Tornado Bowl, Niagara 5-Track Racer, Kamikaze 4-Story Speed Slide and more...
- Pirates of the Caribbean – a unique tropical complex with swimming pools.
- Celtic sauna world – a complex of 16 steam, water and massage baths, saunas and treatments.
- Wellness Paradise – a complex of massages, baths, wraps and other therapeutic and relaxing treatments.
- Summer City – attractions for children and adults.
- Animation – (group activities and programs for children and adults).
- 10+ bistros, including Marina bar, Tasty Corner, Restaurant Paradiso, Grill House, Holiday Village Restaurant and others.
