= Western Water Park =

Water park in Magaluf, Spain

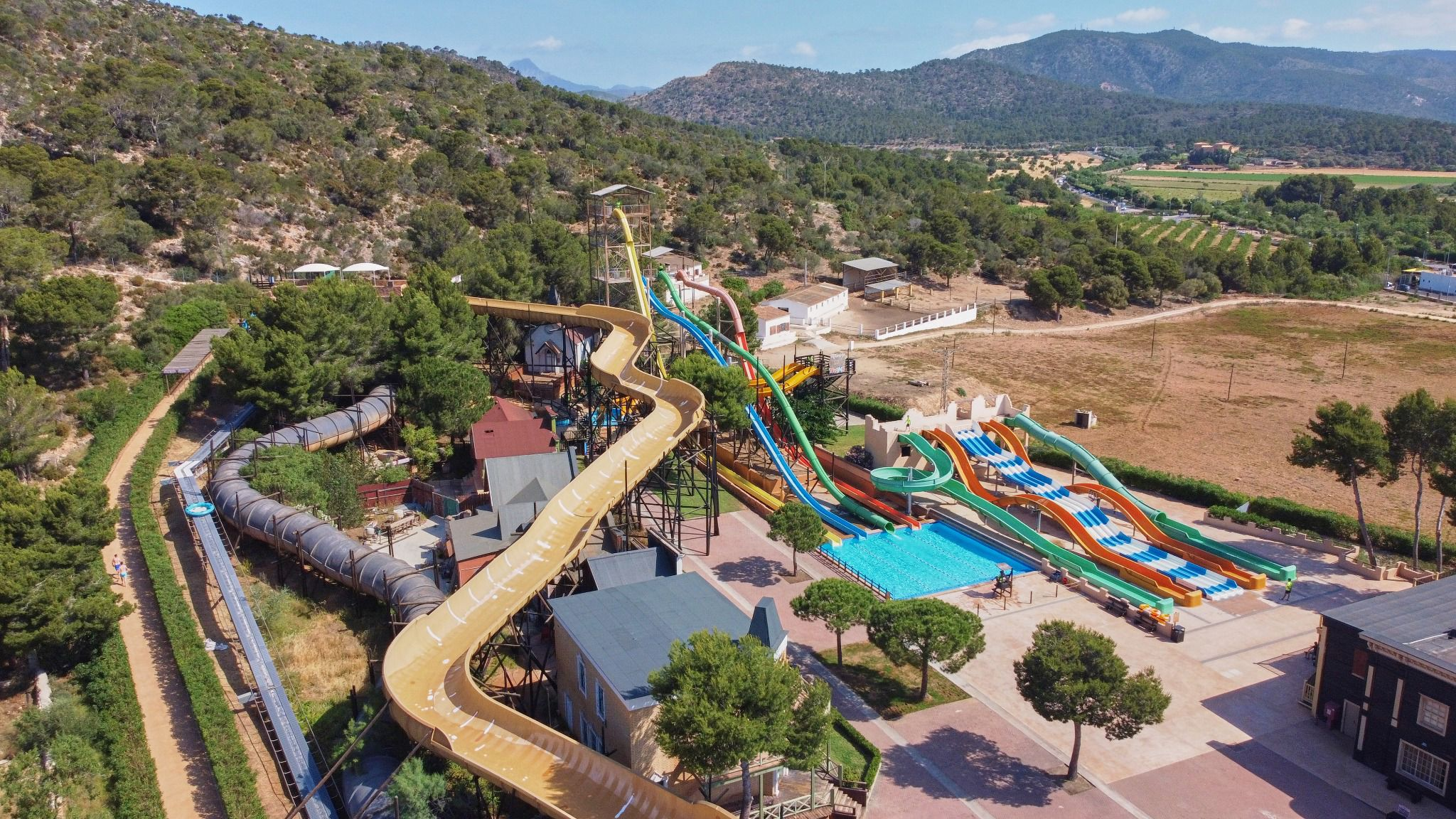
- A view of the northern-most point of the park, containing the 5th tallest water slide in Europe: "The Beast".
- Interactive map of Western Water Park
- Location: Magaluf, Mallorca, Spain
- Coordinates: 39.50702°N 2.51678°E
- Owner: Aspro Parks
- Opened: 1987
- Previous names: El Dorado
- Pools: 2 pools
- Water slides: 20 water slides
- Children's areas: 4 children's areas
- Website: www.westernpark.com

Western Water Park is a water park, located in Magaluf, Mallorca, Spain. The park consists of three wild-west themed areas: Western Land, Indian Town and El Paso. The park currently has the 5th highest slide in Europe, named The Beast, together with "Freefall" in Aquashow Park, Portugal.

Overall, the park has received mostly positive reviews for its wide variety of attractions and "thrill-seeker" water-slides. The park boasts both the highest slide in Spain and longest slide in Mallorca (see "Attractions"). It is the second-largest water-park in Mallorca, behind Aqualand El Arenal.

== History ==
In 1987 the park was inaugurated with the name El Dorado. It did not have any water attractions until 2002, when a series of water attractions, swimming pools, and finally slides, were added. Before, the park also had a show with birds of prey, but management concluded it was not in line with the parks setting and thus the birds were moved to Marineland in Mallorca.

== Visitors ==
About 50 percent of the parks visitors are from England, followed by the residents of Mallorca and subsequently Germany, Russia and Italy. The park is visited by 3,000 to 4,000 people daily. In 2010 250,000 people visited the park.

== Attractions ==
=== Adrenaline Fun ===
- The Beast: The center-piece of the park is the attraction nicknamed "The Beast", containing 4 different water slides of varying characteristics. The yellow variant is widely considered the tied 5th highest water-slide in Europe and the tallest in Spain - though enthusiasts debate exact measurements. The orange variant is considered the steepest slide in Spain, as well as one of the steepest in the entirety of Europe.
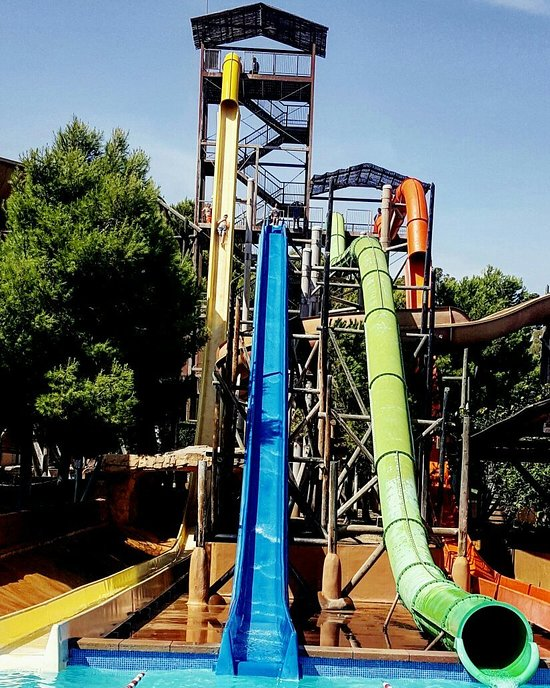
  The 4 separate variants of "The Beast".
- Él Latigo
- Cola del Diablo
- Tornado
- Tijuana Twins
- Boomerang
- Crazy Horses

=== Family Fun ===
- Tam Tam Splash
- Huracán
- Big Hole
- Gran Cañón: A 220-metre-long water slide rideable by 4 people at once. It is the longest slide in Mallorca and one of the longest in Spain.

=== Kidzworld ===
- La Ponderosa
- Daky Park
- Coyote Park
- El Álamo

=== Chill Out & Play ===
- Wild River
- Bath House
- Cascada
- Chorros
