= World Waterpark Association =

Trade association for water park operators

- Abbreviation: WWA
- Formation: 1982
- Type: non-profit organization
- Headquarters: Overland Park, Kansas, U.S.
- Region served: Worldwide
- Services: Education, Amusement Industry Association, Trade News, Trade Shows,
- Chair: Chris Landgrave
- President: Rick Root
- Board of directors: 14
- Staff: 9 (2016)
- Website: www.waterparks.org

The World Waterpark Association (WWA), which was started in 1982, is an international not-for-profit member-based trade association that serves waterparks, aquatic venues and spray parks. The WWA is focused on providing its 1,200 members with the education and networking that they need to operate safely and effectively.

== History and organization ==
Founded in 1982, World Waterpark Association was inspired by the creativity and success of George Millay, the "Father of the Waterpark", who designed the industry-changing SeaWorld and Wet 'n Wild amusement parks. The organization is currently led by Rick Root, who was named President in 2001.

The World Waterpark Association is governed by a volunteer Board of Directors consisting of 14 waterpark owners, operators, suppliers and developers. The term of each board position is 2 years. A Governance Committee comprises the chairman, vice chairman, treasurer and secretary.

== Services ==
World Waterpark Association launched the World's Largest Swimming Lesson in 2010. It is an annual, worldwide event that focuses on the importance of learning to swim and the need for drowning prevention education. On June 20, 2014, they broke the world record with 36,564 participants at multiple venues in 480 locations in 22 countries.

== World Waterpark Magazine ==
World Waterpark Magazine is a trade journal for the global water park industry. It is published 10 times a year in both print and digital version.
