= List of amusement parks in Europe =

The following is a list of amusement parks in Europe sorted by region.

== Armenia ==
=== Yerevan ===
- Victory Park

== Austria ==
- Hirschalm, Unterweißenbach, Upper Austria (Hirschalm Fairytale Hunting Park)
- Märchenpark Neusiedlersee, St. Margarethen, Burgenland (Neusiedlersee Family Park)
- Wiener Prater, Vienna (Wiener Prater amusement park)

=== Carinthia ===
- 1. Kärntner Erlebnispark, Hermagor

=== Salzburg ===
- Erlebnispark Strasswalchen, Strasswalchen
- Wild & Freizeitpark Ferleiten, Ferleiten

=== Styria ===
- Freizeitzentrum Stubenberg, Stubenberg
- Wild und Erlebnispark, Mautern in Steiermark

=== Tyrol ===
- Familienland Erlebnispark, Sankt Jakob in Haus
- Freizeitzentrum Zahmer Kaiser, Walchsee
- Spielpark Leutasch, Leutasch
- Witches' Water, Söll

== Azerbaijan ==
=== Qabala Rayon ===
- Qabaland, Qabala

== Belarus ==
=== Minsk ===
- Chelyuskinites Park
- Gorky Park
- Dreamland

== Belgium ==
=== Brussels ===
- Océade, Bruparck, Brussels (closed in 2018)
- Mini-Europe, Brussels

=== Flanders ===
- Bellewaerde (aka: Safari Bellewaerde, Toeristisch Centrum Bellewaerde), Ypres
- Bobbejaanland, Lichtaart
- Boudewijn Seapark (aka: Dolfinarium Brugge, Boudewijnpark), Bruges
- Circus Bruul, Geel
- Plopsa Indoor Hasselt, Hasselt
- Plopsaland (aka: Meli Park), Adinkerke, De Panne
- Plopsaqua De Panne, Adinkerke, De Panne
- Plopsa Station, Antwerp (closed in 2026)
- ZoetWaterPark (aka: Zoete Waters), Oud-Heverlee, Flemish Brabant

=== Wallonia ===
- Euro Space Center, Transinne, province of Luxembourg
- Plopsaland Ardennes (former Plopsa Coo, aka: TéléCoo), Stavelot, province of Liège
- Walibi Belgium (former Six Flags), Wavre, Walloon Brabant

== Croatia ==
- Dinopark Funtana, Funtana
- Glavani Park, Barban, Pula
- Fun Park Biograd, Biograd

== Cyprus ==
- Pafos Luna Park, Geroskipou, Paphos
- Parko Paliatso, Ayia Napa, Famagusta
- Protaras Fun Park, Protaras, Famagusta

== Czech Republic ==
- Aquapalace Prague
- Aqualand Moravia
- Dinopark, Plzeň, Prague, Liberec, Vyškov, Ostrava
- Prague Lunapark, Prague

== Denmark ==
=== Bornholm ===
- Joboland, Svaneke

=== Jutland ===
- Djurs Sommerland, Nimtofte
- Fårup Sommerland, Saltum
- Karolinelund, Aalborg (closed in 2010)
- Legoland Billund, Billund
- Rømø Lege- & Hesteland, Rømø
- Tivoli Friheden, Århus
- Universe, Nordborg
- Varde Sommerland, Varde (closed in 2002)

=== Sjælland ===
- BonBon-Land, Holme-Olstrup
- Dyrehavsbakken, Klampenborg
- Marielyst Familiepark & Aqualand, Marielyst
- Sommerpark, Græsted (closed in 2009)
- Sommerland Sjælland, Nykøbing
- Tivoli Gardens, Copenhagen

== Finland ==
- Mariepark, Mariehamn, Åland
- Nokkakivi, Lievestuore, Laukaa, Central Finland
- PowerPark, Alahärmä, Kauhava, South Ostrobothnia
- Puuhamaa, Tervakoski, Janakkala, Kanta-Häme
- Visulahti, Mikkeli, South Savo
- Wasalandia, Vaasa, Ostrobothnia (Closed in 2015)

=== Uusimaa ===
- Linnanmäki, Helsinki
- Planet FunFun (aka: Fanfaari), Kerava

=== Kymenlaakso ===
- Tykkimäki, Kouvola

=== Western Finland ===
- Moomin World, Naantali, Southwest Finland
- Särkänniemi (aka: Neula's amusement), Tampere, Pirkanmaa

== France ==
- Europark, Vias, Occitanie
- Futuroscope, Poitiers, Poitou-Charentes
- Napoleonland, Montereau-Fault-Yonne
- Nigloland, Dolancourt, Champagne-Ardenne
- OK Corral, Cuges-les-Pins

=== Alsace ===
- Cigoland, Kintzheim
- Didi'Land (aka: Fantasialand), Morsbronn-les-Bains

=== Aquitaine ===
- Kid Parc, Gujan Mestras
- Walibi Aquitaine, Rocquefort

=== Auvergne ===
- Le Pal, Dompierre Sur Bresbe
- Parc Fenestre, La Bourboule
- Vulcania, Saint-Ours-les-Roches

=== Brittany ===
- Cobac Parc, Lanhélin
- La Récré des 3 Curés, Milizac

=== Burgundy ===
- Florida Parc, Brochon
- Parc Récréatif de la Toison d'or, Dijon
- Parc Touristique des Combes, Le Creusot
- Touro Parc, Romanèche-Thorins

=== Ile-de-France ===
- Fami Parc, Nonville
- France Miniature, Élancourt
- Jardin d'Acclimatation, Paris
- Mirapolis, Cergy-Pontoise

==== Marne-la-Vallée ====
- Disneyland Paris (opened as Euro Disney Resort)
  - Disneyland Park (opened as Euro Disneyland)
  - Disney Adventure World

=== Lorraine ===
- Fraispertuis City, Jeanménil
- Walygator Parc (aka: Walibi Lorraine, Walibi Schtroumpf, Big Bang Schtroumpf), Maizières-les-Metz

=== Lower Normandy ===
- Festyland, Bretteville-Sur-Odon
- Parc Festyland, Caen

=== Upper Normandy ===
- Parc du Bocasse, Bocasse

=== Midi-Pyrénées ===
- Cité de l'espace, Toulouse

=== Nord-Pas de Calais ===
- Bagatelle, Merlimont
- Dennlys Parc, Dennebroeucq
- Parc de Lomme, Lomme

=== Pays de la Loire ===
- Holly Park, Échemiré
- Papea City, Le Mans
- Puy du Fou, Les Epesses

=== Picardy ===
- Mer de Sable, Ermenonville
- Parc Astérix, Plailly
- Parc Saint Paul, Saint-Paul

=== Provence-Alpes-Côte d'Azur ===
- Antibes Land, Antibes
- Azur Park, St. Tropez
- Koaland, Menton
- Lunapark Fréjus, Fréjus
- Magic Park Land (aka: El Dorado City), Ensuès-la-Redonne
- Magic World, Hyères
- OK Corral, Cuges-les-Pins
- Zygo Park (aka: Zygofolis), Nice

=== Rhône-Alpes ===
- Aérocity Parc, Aubenas
- Walibi Rhône-Alpes (aka: Avenir Land), Les Avenières

== Germany ==
- Gulliver-Welt, Saarbrücken, Saarland
- Spree-Park, Berlin

=== Baden-Württemberg ===
- Auto & Technik Museum Sinsheim, Sinsheim
- Erlebnispark Tripsdrill, Cleebronn
- Europa-Park, Rust
- Familien Park, Villingen-Schwenningen
- Funny-World, Kappel-Grafenhausen
- Ravensburger Spieleland, Meckenbeuren
- Schwaben Park, Kaisersbach
- Steinwasen Park, Oberried
- Tatzmania, Löffingen
- Trampoline, Heilbronn
- Traumland auf der Bärenhöhle, Sonnenbühl

=== Bavaria ===
- Bavaria Filmstadt, Grünwald
- Bayern Park, Reisbach
- Churpfalzpark, Loifling
- Erlebnispark Schloss Thurn, Heroldsbach
- Fränkisches Wunderland, Plech
- Freizeit-Land Geiselwind, Geiselwind
- Freizeitpark Ruhpolding, Ruhpolding
- Freizeit- und Miniaturpark Allgäu, Weitnau
- Legoland Deutschland, Günzburg
- Märchen Erlebnispark Marquartstein, Marquartstein
- Märchenwald im Isartal, Wolfratshausen
- Playmobil FunPark, Zirndorf
- Rodel- und Freizeitparadies St. Englmar, Sankt Englmar
- Skyline Park, Bad Wörishofen
- Sport+Freizeitzentrum Hohenbogen, Neukirchen beim Heiligen Blut

=== Brandenburg ===
- Karls Erlebnis-Dorf Elstal, Wustermark
- Tier-, Freizeit- und Saurierpark Germendorf, Germendorf
- Tropical Islands Brandenburg, Krausnick
- AbendteuerPark Potsdam, Potsdam
- Filmpark Babelsberg, Potsdam-Babelsberg
- Irrlandia - der MitMachPark, Storkow (Mark)
- El Dorado Templin, Templin

=== Hessen ===
- Erlebnispark Steinau, Steinau an der Straße
- Erlebnispark Ziegenhagen, Witzenhausen
- Freizeitpark Lochmühle, Wehrheim
- Rodelparadies Wasserkuppe, Gersfeld
- Salzberger ErlebnisPark, Neuenstein
- Taunus Wunderland, Schlangenbad
- Wild-und Freizeitpark Willingen, Willingen
- Zoo Frankfurt, Frankfurt

=== Lower Saxony ===
- Erse-Park, Uetze
- Heide Park, Soltau
- Jaderpark, Jade
- Magic Park Verden, Verden
- Nordsee Spielstadt Wangerland, Hohenkirchen
- Rasti-Land, Salzhemmendorf
- Serengeti Safaripark, Hodenhagen
- Tier-und Freizeitpark Thüle, Friesoythe
- Wildpark Schwarze Berge, Rosengarten

=== Mecklenburg-Vorpommern ===
- Rügen Park, Gingst

=== North Rhine-Westphalia ===
- Affen-und Vogelpark, Reichshof Eckenhagen
- Fort Fun Abenteuerland, Bestwig
- Freizeitanlage Start und Ziel, Herne
- Freizeitzentrum SchiederSee, Delbrück
- Hollywood & Safaripark Stukenbrock, Stukenbrock
- Panorama Park, Kirchhundem
- Phantasialand, Brühl
- Potts Park, Minden
- Spielerei Rheda-Wiedenbrück, Rheda-Wiedenbrück
- Tierpark Nadermann, Schöning
- Wunderland Kalkar

==== Bottrop ====
- Movie Park Germany (aka: Warner Bros. Movie World Germany, Bavaria Filmpark Bottrop, Neue Traumland, TraumlandPark, Kirchhellener Märchenwald)
- Schloss Beck, Bottrop

Köln

- Kölner Tivoli
- Tobiland

=== Rhineland-Palatinate ===
- Eifelpark, Gondorf
- FreizeitPark Bell, Bell
- Plopsaland Deutschland, Haßloch (formerly known as Holiday Park)
- Wild-und Freizeitpark Klotten/Cochem, Klotten

=== Saxony ===
- Belantis, Leipzig
- Freizeitpark Plohn (aka: Erlebnispark Forellenhof Plohn), Lengenfeld
- Sonnenlandpark, Lichtenau
- Kulturinsel Einsiedel, Zentendorf bei Görlitz

=== Saxony-Anhalt ===
- Erlebnistierpark Memleben, Memleben
- Erlebniswelt Seilbahnen Thale, Thale
- Little Harz, Wernigerode

=== Schleswig-Holstein ===
- Hansa-Park (aka: Hansaland, Legoland Sierksdorf), Sierksdorf
- Tolk Schau, Tolk

=== Thuringia ===
- Märchenwald Saalburg, Saalburg

== Georgia ==
=== Tbilisi ===
- Mtatsminda Park

=== Batumi ===
- Batumi Lunapark

== Greece ==
=== Athens ===
- Allou Fun Park

=== Heraclion ===
- Luna Park Katerina

=== Thessaloniki ===
- Magic Park

== Hungary ==
=== Debrecen ===
- Debrecen Zoo and Amusement Park, Debrecen

== Ireland ==
- Clara Lara FunPark, County Wicklow
- Emerald Park, Ashbourne, County Meath
- Fort Lucan, Lucan, Dublin
- Funderland (travelling theme park)
- Funtasia, Bettystown, County Meath
- Tramore Amusement Park, Tramore, County Waterford

== Italy ==
- Safari Park, Pombia, Piedmont

=== Apulia ===
- Felifonte, Castellaneta
- Zoosafari Fasanolandia, Fasano
- Miragica, Molfetta

=== Campania ===
==== Province of Naples ====
- Edenlandia, Naples
- Magic World, Giugliano in Campania

=== Emilia-Romagna ===
- Fiabilandia, Rimini
- Mirabilandia, Ravenna
- Italia in miniatura, Rimini

=== Lazio ===
==== Rome ====
- Luneur
- Oasi Park
- Rainbow Magicland
- Zoomarine
- Cinecittà World

=== Lombardy ===
- AdventureLand Borno, Borno
- Cowboyland, Voghera
- Europark Idroscalo Milano (aka: Luna Euro Park), Segrate
- Greenland, Limbiate
- Minigolf Adventure, Milan
- Leolandia, Capriate San Gervasio
- Prehistoric Park, Rivolta d'Adda
- Volandia, Somma Lombardo

=== Tuscany ===
- Cavallino Matto, Castagneto Carducci, Tuscany

=== Veneto ===
- Carosello Park, Sottomarina
- Gardaland, Castelnuovo del Garda
- Movieland Studios (aka: Movie Studios Park), Lazise
- Playplace, Verona

== Latvia ==
- ABpark, Lēdmane Parish

== Liechtenstein ==
- Minigolf-Sportanlag, Schaan/Vaduz

== Lithuania ==
- UNO Parks Vilnius
- UNO Parks Kaunas
- UNO Parks Druskininkai

== Luxembourg ==
- Parc Merveilleux, Bettembourg

== Malta ==
- Playmobil FunPark, Ħal Far
- Popeye Village, Mellieħa
- Splash and Fun, Bahar Ic-Caghaq

== Netherlands ==
=== Drenthe ===
- Drouwenerzand Attractiepark Drouwen
- Park Oikos, Ruinen
- Plopsa Indoor Coevorden, Coevorden
- Rijk der Kabouters en Laven, Eext
- Sprookjeshof, Zuidlaren
- Verkeerspark Assen, Assen

=== Flevoland ===
- Walibi Holland, Biddinghuizen

=== Friesland (Fryslán) ===
- Duinen Zathe, Appelscha
- Kameleondorp, Terhorne

=== Gelderland ===
- Amusementspark Tivoli, Berg en Dal
- Het Land van Jan Klaassen, Braamt
- Koningin Juliana Toren, Apeldoorn
- Bommelwereld, Groenlo

=== Groningen ===
- Familiepark Nienoord, Leek, (Groningen)
- Wonderwereld, Ter Apel

=== Limburg ===
- Attractiepark Toverland, Sevenum
- De Valkenier, Valkenburg aan de Geul
- Sprookjesbos Valkenburg, Valkenburg aan de Geul
- Kinderstad Heerlen, Heerlen

=== Noord Brabant ===
- Sprookjespark de Efteling, Kaatsheuvel
- Mini Efteling, Nieuwkuijk
- Speelland, Hilvarenbeek
- DippieDoe, Best

=== Noord Holland ===
- Amsterdam Dungeon, Amsterdam
- Oud Valkeveen, Naarden
- Sprookjeswonderland, Enkhuizen

=== Overijssel ===
- Attractiepark Slagharen, Slagharen
- Avonturenpark Hellendoorn, Hellendoorn
- De Waarbeek, Hengelo
- Dinoland Zwolle, Zwolle

=== Zuid Holland ===
- Drievliet, Den Haag
- Duinrell, Wassenaar
- Madurodam, The Hague
- Speelstad Rotterdam, Rotterdam (coming soon in 2025)

=== Zeeland ===
- Deltapark Neeltje Jans, vrouwenpolder
- Mini Mundi, Middelburg

== Norway ==
- Bø Sommarland, Bø i Telemark, Telemark
- Hunderfossen Familiepark, Lillehammer, Innlandet
- Kongeparken, Ålgård, Rogaland
- Kristiansand Zoo and Amusement Park, Kristiansand, Agder
- TusenFryd, Oslo

== Poland ==
=== Lesser Poland ===
- Energylandia, Zator
- Inwałd Park, Inwałd
- Rabkoland, Rabka-Zdrój
- Zatorland, Zator

=== Lubusz Land ===
- Holiday Park, Kownaty
  - Majaland Kownaty, Torzym

=== Łódź Province ===
- Mandoria Miasto Przygód, Rzgów

=== Mazovia ===
- Park of Poland, Wręcza
- Majaland Warszawa, Góraszka
- Farma Iluzji, Trojanów

=== Pomerania ===
- Kaszubski Park Miniatur, Strysza Buda
- Lunapark Krynica, Krynica Morska
- Lunapark Sowiński, Władysławowo
- Majaland Gdansk, Gdańsk

=== Western Pomerania ===
- Hossoland, Brojce
- Pomerania Fun Park, Dygowo

=== Silesia ===
- Esplanada, Szklarska Poręba
- Legendia (aka: Silesian Amusement Park), Chorzów
- Ogrodzieniec Park, Ogrodzieniec

== Portugal ==
- Aqualand, Alcantarilha
- Aquashow, Quarteira
- Naturwaterpark, Vila Real
- Norpark, Nazaré, Portugal
- Parque Aquático de Amarante, Amarante, Portugal
- Parque Aquático no Complexo Desportivo do Príncipe Perfeito, Viseu
- Portugal dos Pequenitos, Coimbra, Centro
- Scorpio, Guimarães
- Slide & Splash, Lagoa, Algarve
- Zoomarine, Albufeira

== Romania ==
- Parc Aventura Brașov, Brașov
- Arsenal Park Transilvania, Orăștie
- Luna Parc, Pitești
- Orășelul Copiilor, Bucharest
- Satul de Vacanță, Mamaia
- Alex & Emma's Land, Pietroșani

== Russia ==
- Beoland, Nizhny Novgorod
- Rivyera, Kazan

=== Krasnodar Krai ===
- Admiral Vrungel, Gelendzhik
- Krasnodar Park, Krasnodar
- Sochi Park, Sochi

=== Moscow ===
- Attractionmania
- Gorky Park
- Sokolniki Park
- Star Galaxy Adventure
- VDNKh
- Dream Island

=== Saint Petersburg ===
- Gagarin Park
- Park Alisa
- Park Yulya
- Wonder Island

== Slovakia ==
- DinoPark, Kosice
- Tatrapolis Svet Miniatúr, Liptovský Mikuláš

== Slovenia ==
- Adventure Park Postojna, Postojna

== Spain ==
=== Andalusia ===
- Isla Mágica, Seville
- Tivoli World, Benalmádena

=== Aragon ===
- Dinópolis, Teruel
- Parque de Atracciones de Zaragoza, Zaragoza

=== Basque Country ===
- Parque de Atracciones Monte Igueldo, San Sebastián

=== Castile-La Mancha ===
- Puy du Fou España, Toledo, Spain

=== Catalonia ===
- Ferrari Land, Salou
- PortAventura Park, Salou and Vilaseca
- Tibidabo Amusement Park, Barcelona

=== Community of Madrid ===
- Parque de Atracciones de Madrid, Madrid
- Parque Warner Madrid, San Martín de la Vega

=== Navarre ===
- Sendaviva, Arguedas

=== Valencian Community ===
- DinoPark Algar, Callosa d'en Sarrià
- Pola Park, Santa Pola
- Terra Mítica, Benidorm

== Sweden ==
- Astrid Lindgren's World, Vimmerby
- Furuviksparken, Gävle
- Gröna Lund, Stockholm
- High Chaparral Theme Park, Värnamo
- Kneippbyn, Gotland
- Kolmården Wildlife Park, Kolmården
- Liseberg, Gothenburg
- Öland Zoo, Färjestaden (Öland)
- Parken Zoo, Eskilstuna
- Skara Sommarland, Skara
- Santaworld, Mora
- Tosselilla Summer Park, Tomelilla

== Switzerland ==
- Connyland, Lipperswil
- Jungfrau Park, Interlaken
- Swiss Vapeur Parc, Le Bouveret

== Turkey ==
- Vialand, Istanbul
- Masal Park, Osmaniye
- Mazakaland, Kayseri
- Parkantep Harikalar Diyarı, Gaziantep
- Wonderland Eurasia, Ankara
- The Land of Legends, Antalya

== Ukraine ==
- Ancient Kyiv, Principality of Kyivan Rus, Kyivan region, village Kopachiv

== United Kingdom ==
- Universal Studios Great Britain, Bedford, United Kingdom (currently in development stage)
- Legoland Windsor Resort
- Alton Towers
- Chessington World Of Adventures

== See also ==
- List of amusement parks
- List of water parks in Europe
