= Edenlandia =

Amusement park in Naples, Italy

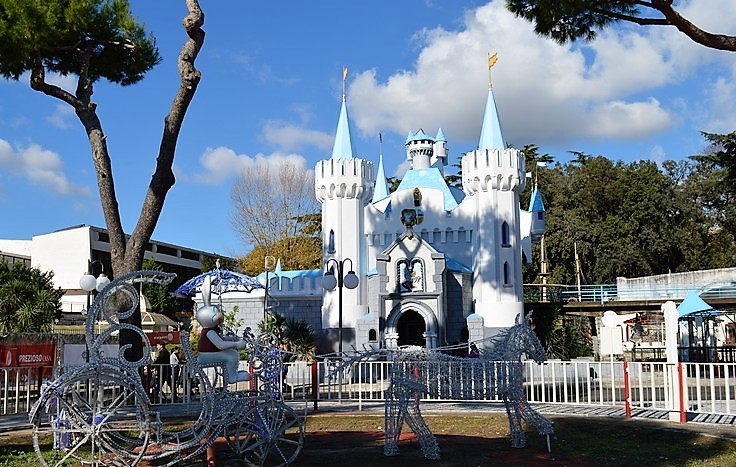
- The Castle of Lord Sheidon at Edenlandia
- Interactive map of Edenlandia
- Location: Fuorigrotta, Naples, Campania, Italy
- Coordinates: 40°49′20.83″N 14°10′57.34″E
- Status: Operating
- Opened: 19 June 1965; 61 years ago
- Operated by: New Edenlandia S.p.A.
- Website: www.edenlandia.it

Edenlandia is an amusement park in Naples, Italy, located on Viale John Fitzgerald Kennedy in the Fuorigrotta district. Opened on 19 June 1965, it is one of Italy's oldest amusement parks and was among the country's earliest permanent amusement parks inspired by the model of Disneyland.

The park developed from an amusement area originally planned as part of the Mostra d'Oltremare exhibition complex. After decades of operation, financial difficulties led to its closure in 2013. It reopened to the public on 26 July 2018 following restoration and redevelopment.

In March 2025, Edenlandia was temporarily closed by the Municipality of Naples following inspections that identified safety and maintenance irregularities. The park subsequently resumed operations and received a new operating licence in April 2025.

== Origins ==
The entrance arches of Edenlandia, originally designed for the Mostra d'Oltremare complex

The origins of Edenlandia are connected with the development of the Mostra d'Oltremare, an exhibition complex planned in Naples during the Fascist period. The original project included an area intended for public entertainment, travelling fairs, circuses and other recreational activities.

The distinctive entrance arches, later associated with Edenlandia, were designed in 1938 as part of the exhibition grounds. According to the architect's original explanation, their curved form represented the movement of sea waves, reflecting the maritime theme of the Mostra d'Oltremare.

A popular interpretation holds that the arches were designed to resemble the signature of Benito Mussolini. However, this interpretation differs from the architectural explanation documented in the historical account of the complex.

The Second World War interrupted the development of the exhibition grounds. The complex suffered damage during Allied bombing and was subsequently used for military purposes. The recreational area was not developed into the permanent amusement park known as Edenlandia until the 1960s.

== History ==
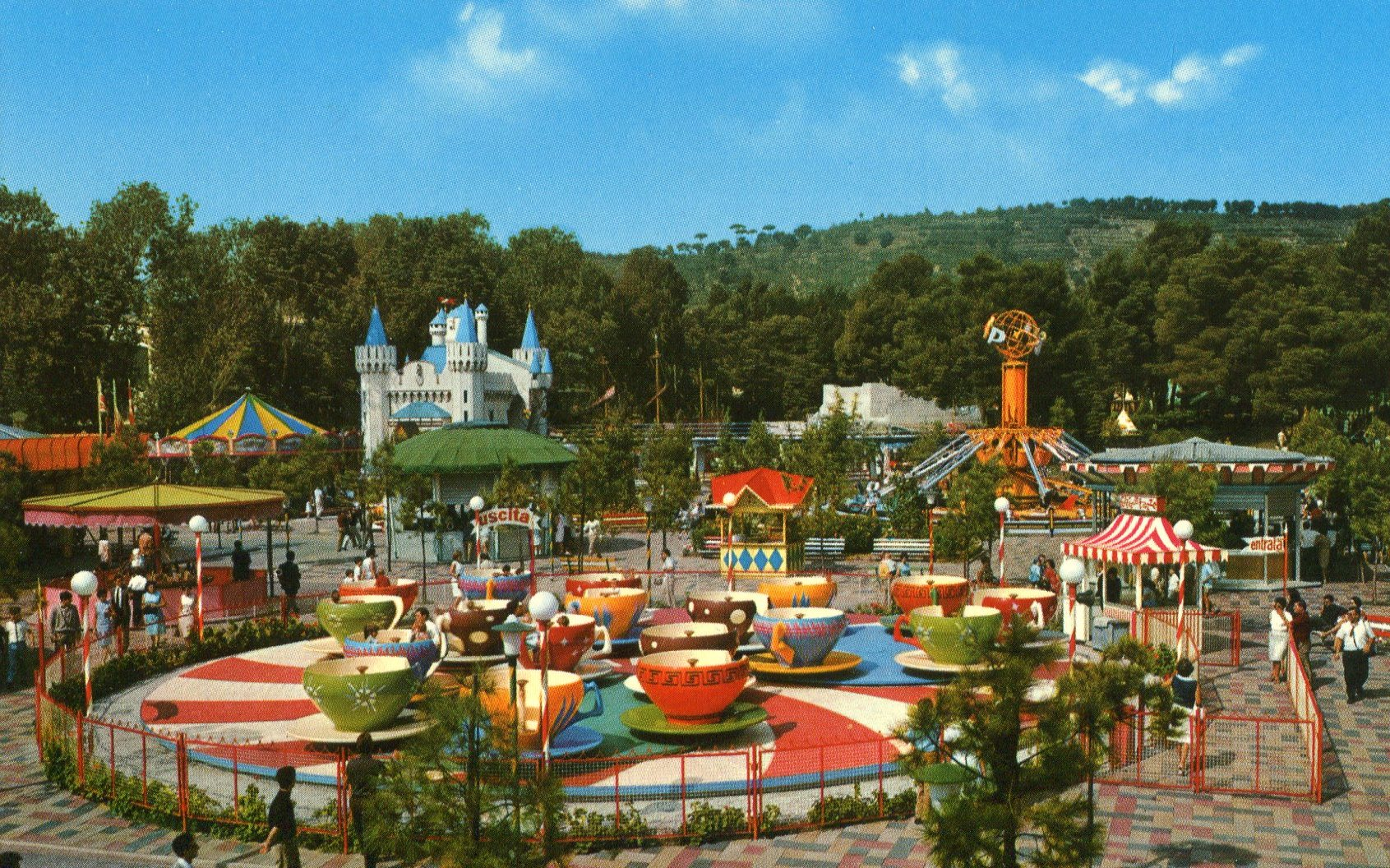
Edenlandia in 1965

=== 1960s: Foundation and opening ===
Before Edenlandia opened, Naples had a smaller amusement area in the Villa Comunale, with attractions including a miniature railway, bumper cars, a small roller coaster, flying-saucer rides and a Ferris wheel.

The Edenlandia project was developed between 1963 and 1964, drawing inspiration from the permanent amusement park model introduced by Walt Disney at Disneyland in California in 1955. Unlike a travelling fairground, Edenlandia was conceived as a permanent complex combining amusement rides, entertainment, restaurants and recreational facilities for families.

Construction began during the winter of 1964, and the park officially opened on 19 June 1965. Its development was led by entrepreneurs Oreste Rossotto and Luigi Falchero. The site plan was prepared by Rossotto and Falchero, the latter becoming the park's director.

Another participant in the project was Cesare Rosa, who designed several early attractions, including the Autopista del Sole and Cascate del Niagara, a log flume ride.

The park adopted visual elements reminiscent of Disneyland, including a castle emblem and Gothic-style lettering. Its original logo featured the name Edenlandia in yellow lettering above a blue castle. This design remained largely unchanged until 1990, when a ring of stars was added around the castle and the lettering was modified.

The Castle of Lord Sheidon, constructed near the centre of the park, became one of Edenlandia's most recognisable attractions. Together with the nearby lake, pirate galleon and miniature railway, it formed part of the park's original themed environment.

=== 1970s: Growth and popularity ===
During the 1970s, Edenlandia developed into a tourist attraction drawing visitors from Naples, other parts of Italy and abroad.

The park offered attractions based on different themes. These included Jumbo, an elephant-themed ride inspired by the character Dumbo from Disney's animated film, alongside themed environments and mechanical attractions.

Food and refreshments also became an established part of the park's identity. Restaurants and bars included Il Covo dei Pirati, Birreria Bavarese and the lakeside Chalet. Edenlandia became particularly associated with graffe, a variety of fried doughnut popular in Naples.

Following Luigi Falchero's death in October 1974, management passed to his son Cesare Falchero, who subsequently became the park's president and managing director.

During this period, the Italian amusement park industry began expanding. Gardaland, which opened in 1975, became a major competitor to Edenlandia in subsequent decades.

=== 1980s and 1990s: Declining attendance ===
During the 1980s and 1990s, Edenlandia experienced declining attendance as larger and more modern amusement parks developed elsewhere in Italy. Its competitors included Gardaland and Mirabilandia, which opened in 1992.

Although Edenlandia continued operating many of its established rides, the expansion of the Italian amusement park industry created increasing competition for visitors. The park's relatively limited area also restricted its capacity for expansion compared with larger developments elsewhere in the country.

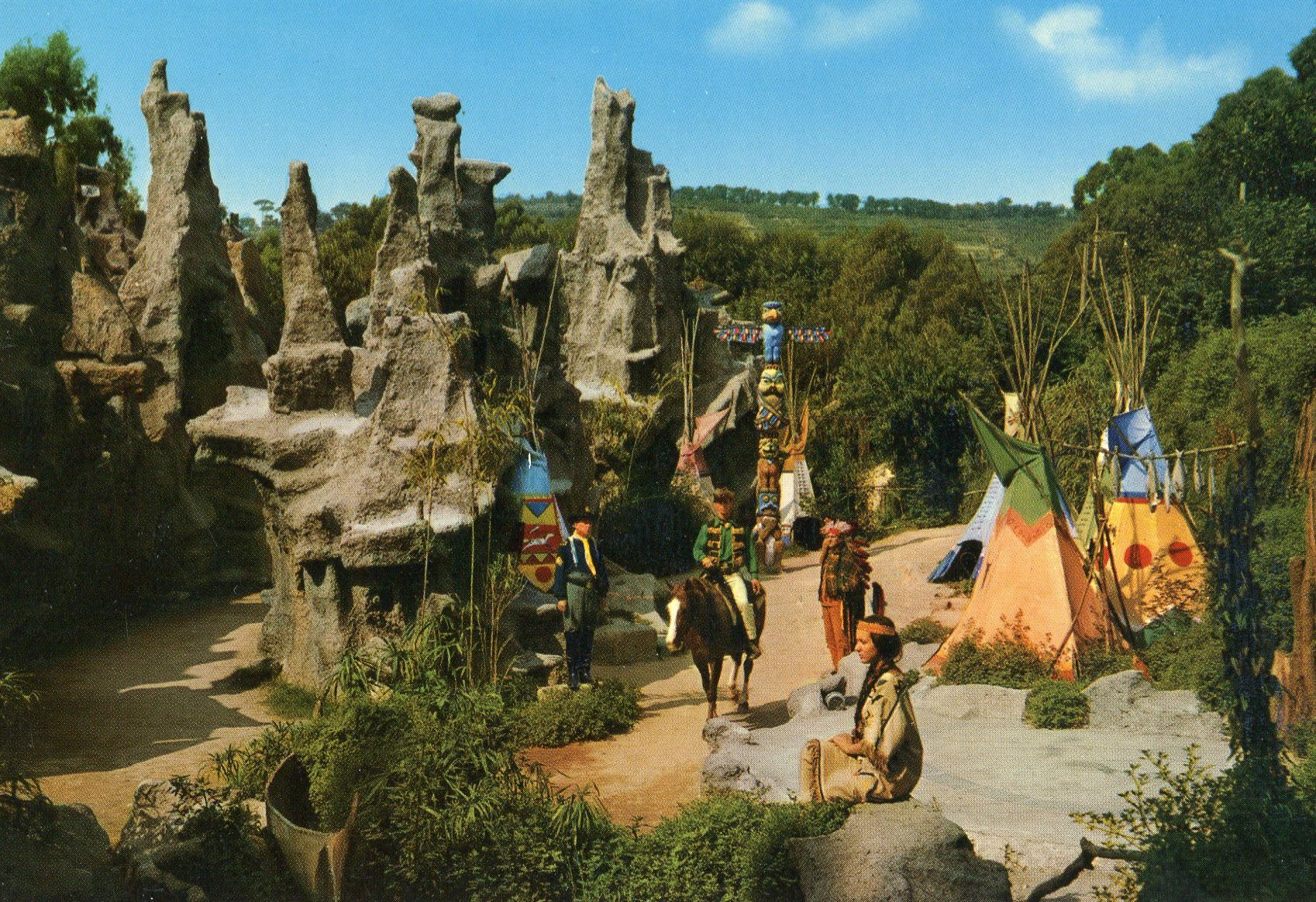
Edenlandia in 1965

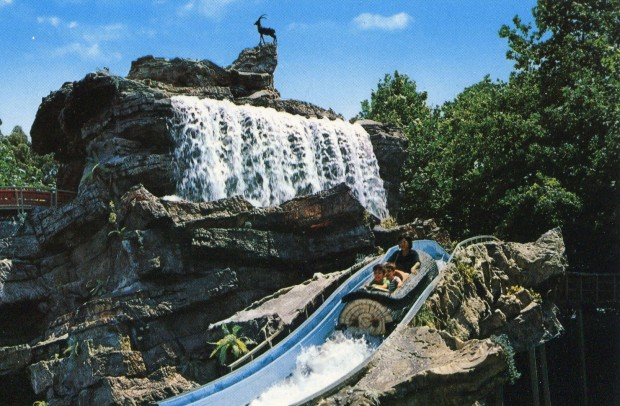
A historical view of the park

An attraction in 1965

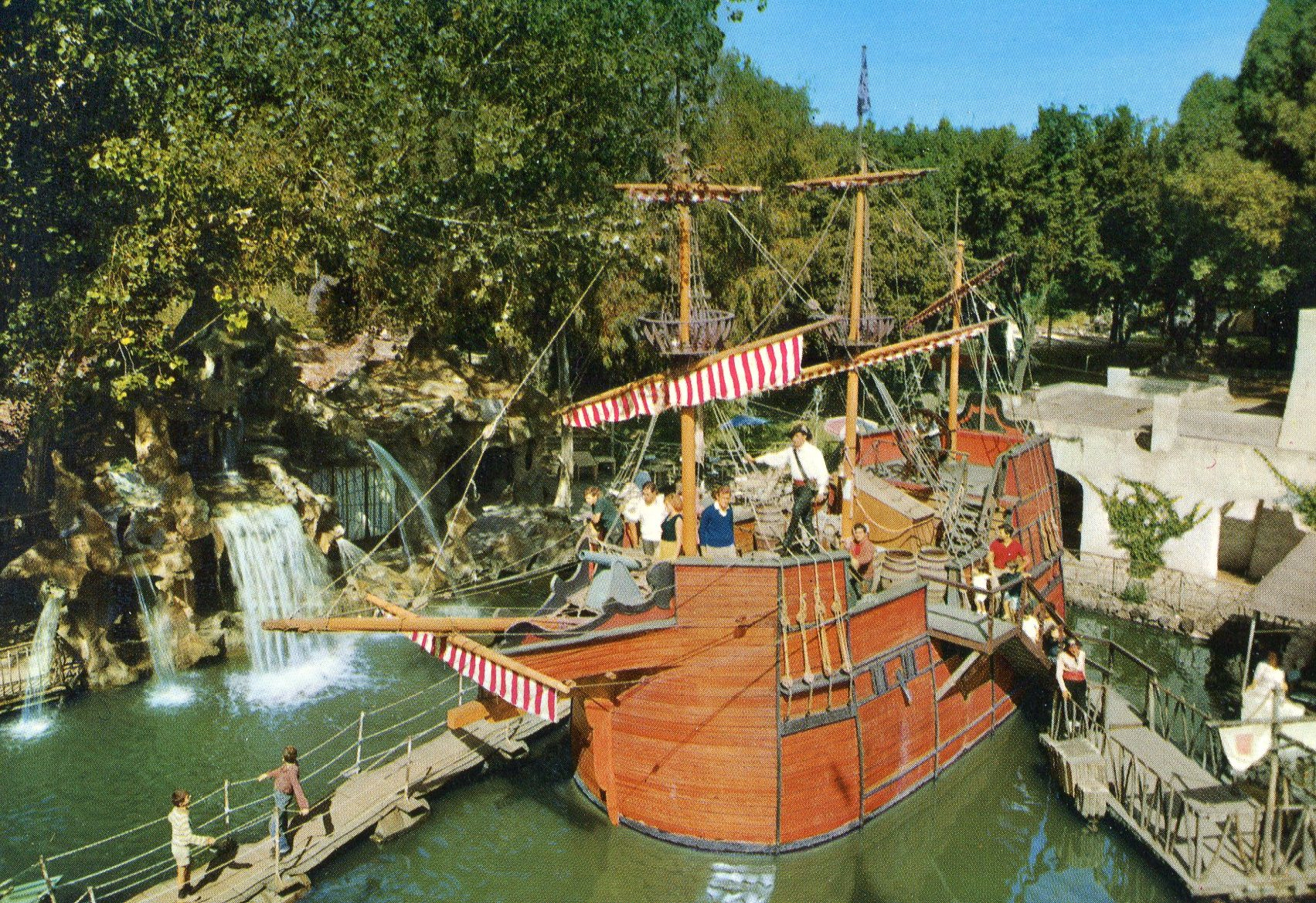
The amusement park in its early years

=== 2000s: Park & Leisure management ===
In the early 2000s, the company Park & Leisure took over the operation of Edenlandia, the adjacent Zoo di Napoli and the former Naples greyhound racing track. The company succeeded the previous operator, O.S.A.I. (Organizzazione Spettacoli Attrazioni Internazionali), which had been involved in the park since its foundation.

Efforts to relaunch the park included promotional campaigns and investments in attractions. Despite these initiatives, the operator faced increasing financial difficulties.

=== 2010s: Bankruptcy, closure and reopening ===
In April 2010, Edenlandia introduced several new attractions in an attempt to revitalise the park.

In October 2011, the company operating the park entered bankruptcy proceedings. Park & Leisure reportedly had debts of approximately €13 million. The Municipality of Naples and Mostra d'Oltremare, which owned the land, sought a new operator to ensure the continuation of the amusement park and the neighbouring zoo.

A court initially authorised the continuation of activities while efforts were made to find a solution. In 2012, the park and associated facilities became the subject of a tender process to identify a new operator.

In November 2012, the London-based company Brain's Park expressed interest in acquiring and redeveloping Edenlandia, with a proposal that also addressed the future employment of approximately 70 workers.

The park closed in January 2013 to enable redevelopment work. However, the British investment proposal was subsequently abandoned amid bureaucratic difficulties and problems related to unauthorised structures at the site. The park's employees were placed on a temporary wage-support scheme.

Several attempts were subsequently made to reopen the park. In September 2014, New Edenlandia took over its management and announced plans to resume operations during the summer of 2015. The reopening was delayed repeatedly as restoration and administrative procedures continued.

In November 2017, the Vorzillo group, through GCR Outsider Holding, assumed control of the redevelopment project. The restoration programme included work on historic rides, improvements to the park's infrastructure and the introduction of new attractions. Architect Giuseppe Klain was involved in the renovation project.

Edenlandia held an inauguration event on 25 July 2018 and officially reopened to the general public on 26 July, more than five years after its closure.

The reopening included restored historic attractions, newly installed rides, food outlets and entertainment facilities. The Municipality of Naples announced that the redeveloped park would contain 23 attractions and a theatre with seating for approximately 400 people, although not all historic rides were immediately available.

=== 2020s: Safety closure and reopening ===
On 7 March 2025, the Municipality of Naples ordered Edenlandia to suspend operations and revoked its licence following safety inspections. Municipal authorities reported significant maintenance deficiencies involving several attractions, including some that were considered to be in a state of deterioration. The order cited widespread irregularities and concerns about visitor safety.

The park resumed limited operations on 22 March 2025 under a provisional authorisation, initially reopening its historic rides.

On 18 April 2025, following the approval of the relevant authorities, Edenlandia obtained a new operating licence from the Municipality of Naples. The park announced the reopening of its attractions, although the Dumbo and Maniero rides remained temporarily unavailable for maintenance and restoration work.

In October 2026, the park hosted a programme of Halloween-themed events under the name Horror World. The initiative included live performances, themed versions of historic attractions and the use of the former greyhound racing venue for circus performances. The park's management also announced plans to restore additional historic rides, including Tronchi and Vecchia America.

== Attractions and facilities ==
Edenlandia features mechanical rides, themed environments, restaurants and entertainment spaces. Its attractions have historically included the Castle of Lord Sheidon, a miniature railway, a pirate galleon, log flumes, car rides and children's attractions.

The park has used several themed areas, including sections dedicated to pirates, the American Old West, medieval settings and children's rides.

Access to the park has generally been free, with visitors paying separately to use individual rides and attractions.

== Location and transport ==
Edenlandia is located on Viale John Fitzgerald Kennedy in the Fuorigrotta district of Naples, near the Mostra d'Oltremare exhibition complex and Stadio Diego Armando Maradona.

The park is served by Edenlandia railway station on the Cumana railway, which is located near its entrance. It can also be reached from Cavalleggeri Aosta railway station on Line 2 of the Naples metropolitan railway service, as well as by local buses.

== Fatal accidents ==
Two fatal accidents at Edenlandia were reported by la Repubblica in 1989 and 2000.

On 4 April 1989, a seven-year-old girl died after falling from one of the vehicles of the Guerre Stellari ("Star Wars") ride. According to the report, the child had stood up while the attraction was operating.

On 14 April 2000, a worker died after falling approximately eight metres while dismantling the Mont Blanc roller coaster. Contemporary reporting indicated that the worker had suffered a sudden illness before the fall.

== See also ==
- Zoo di Napoli
- Mostra d'Oltremare
- List of amusement parks in Europe
- Gardaland
- Mirabilandia (Italy)
