= Erich Buchholz =

German artist

- Born: 31 January 1891; Bromberg, Province of Posen, German Empire (now Bydgoszcz, Poland)
- Died: 29 December 1972 (aged 81); West Berlin, West Germany
- Occupation: Painter

Erich Buchholz (1891–1972) was a German artist in painting and printmaking. He was a central figure in the development of non-objective or concrete art in Berlin between 1918 and 1924. He interrupted his artistic activity in 1925, first because of economic hardship and, from 1933, as he was forbidden to paint by the National-Socialist authorities. He resumed artistic activity in 1945.

== Biography ==
Orbits of the Planets Painted woodblock by Erich Buchholz (1920)

Erich Buchholz was born on 31 January 1891 in Bromberg, Province of Posen, Germany (now Bydgoszcz, Poland). He started working as a teacher in a primary school in Berlin, painting in his free time. In 1914 he decided to become a full-time artist and to study painting with Lovis Corinth, but managed to take only one lesson before being conscripted.

At the end of World War I he returned to Berlin and started working on abstract paintings. In 1918 he designed his first abstract stage sets for the Albert-Theater in Dresden. His first solo exhibition was in 1921 at the Galerie Der Sturm in Berlin and included a series of sixteen woodblocks. The first of these, Orbits of the Planets (Planetenbahnen), was initially designed as a matrix for making woodcut prints, but the artist gradually regarded it as a work of art of its own right and painted the surfaces.

Throughout the 1920s he participated in the annual jury-free art exhibitions in Berlin. At the exhibition Constructivism and Suprematism, organized in 1922 by the Van Diemen Gallery in Berlin, he met László Moholy-Nagy, Laszlo Peri, Ernő Kállai, and El Lissitzky, people with whom he kept close contact in the following years. He also participated in international events such as the First Exhibition of Modern Art in Bucharest.

His studio at 15 Herkulesufer in Berlin was a meeting place for artists of the avant-garde, including—besides painters such as Hannah Höch and Kurt Schwitters—Dadaists writers Richard Huelsenbeck and Raoul Hausmann as well as the pioneers of abstract film Hans Richter and Viking Eggeling. Art critic Heinz Ohff described this studio in Buchholz's obituary, stating, "In 1922 he remodeled his studio flat at Herkulesufer 15 into the first 'environment,' the first abstractly designed three-dimensional space in art history." Original photographs of Buchholz's studio-space design do exist from that period and furthermore he exhibited them in the Grosse Berliner of 1923. The photographs reveal that he had developed it into a coherent abstract space—right down to a model of its ceiling design. The colour of the room in particular was important. A light blue was painted over the smooth surfaces of a fussy wallpaper pattern; a similarly light blue-green covered the rougher surface where wallpaper had been stripped. Both colours tend to lighten and expand the visual impact of a small space. Various motifs on the walls were continuously re-arranged—sometimes the dominant sphere on the wall remains uncovered, sometimes it is in eclipse. This activation of its elements sought to reinforce the mobility experienced when encountering an artwork as a three-dimensional space. A reconstruction of his studio was built and presented in 1969 in the Kunstbibliothek of Berlin, organized and curated by Hans-Peter Heidrich, the director of the Daedulus gallery.

In 1923, Buchholz's interest drifted towards architecture and he started working on the use of shell forms in buildings, such as the design of an egg-form house.

Painting "Golden circle in red and white" by Erich Buchholz (1921)

Besides painting, Erich Buchholz wrote several booklets and articles in which he investigated in depth the relationship between world view and the constructivist principles. Thus, in one of his articles he stated:

The eternal law of recurrence – as in the spiral – is opposed to the law of the eternal non-return – as in the parabola which is a distorted spiral. The former is relative, the latter is absolute. Nothing ever returns.

Due to economic hardship, Buchholz was forced to move from Berlin to the countryside. In 1925, he settled in Germendorf near Berlin where he supported his family through market gardening and by raising poultry. For some time he also opened a sand quarry.

He continued to paint until 1933 when the National Socialists labelled his work "degenerate". He was arrested several times and received an interdiction to paint and participate in exhibitions.

He resumed his activity after the war in 1945. He continued to live in Germendorf until 1950, when he was able to move to West Berlin.

During the 1950s and 1960s, Buchholz held a number of solo exhibitions in Europe and the United States. In 1955, eighteen of his paintings from 1918 to 1922 were purchased by the Berlin Gallery of the 20th Century. In 1969 the Wiesbaden Museum organized a retrospective of his work, which travelled to Cologne and Stuttgart. Another retrospective was organized in 1971 by the Art Library (Kunstbibliothek) of Berlin. He also participated in various art exhibitions such as the Salon des Réalités Nouvelles in Paris.

In 1964, Buchholz presented a sequence of screen-prints, "Constant-Variables," in which he explores the idea of a work of art as permeable in time and space. The series shows a close link with his earlier works of the 1920s. The sequence using just red, white, black is prompted by a simple framework: two oblongs that shift and alternate on a diagonal axis, a fixed sequence of three lines and one central block shape. Such minimal criteria set up a wider range of permutations in the course of the six variations, which transpose further shifts in the colour of the ground in relation to the fixed elements as well as in the alternation of the oblongs from a diagonal axis to a horizontal-vertical alignment

Erich Buchholz died in West Berlin on 29 December 1972.

== Bibliography ==
- Erich Buchholz, Zeichnungen, Plastik, Ölbilder, Aquarelle – Katalog Kunstverein Braunschweig 1961
- Erich Buchholz – Katalog Deutsche Gesellschaft für Bildende Kunst, Berlin 1965
- Erich Buchholz, Maler, Bildhauer, Architekt. Dokumentation der Jahre 1919-1925 – Eau de Cologne Nr. 1, Köln 1968
- Erich Buchholz – AKKA, Katalog Galerie Daedalus, Berlin 1971
- Erich Buchholz, Zeichnungen, Aquarelle, Platten, Skulpturen 1918-1922 – Katalog Galerie Teufel, Köln 1978
- Michel Seuphor (ed.) – A dictionary of abstract painting – Methuen, London, 1958
- Anne Kirker, Jacqueline Strecker – Erich Buchholz: The Restless Avant-gardist – Published by the Queensland Art Gallery, 2000. ISBN 1-876509-72-4
- Erich Buchholz, DDR Strafrecht unterm Bundesadler – Februar 2011, ISBN 389706832X, ISBN 978-3897068322

== Publications ==
- Die Idee ist der Todfeind des Lebens, 1922 (In: Erich Buchholz – Katalog Deutsche Gesellschaft für Bildende Kunst, Berlin 1965
- Das rote Heft, Berlin 1927
- Die große Zäsur, Berlin 1953
- Das Buchholz-Ei, Flensburg 1963
- Untersuchungen über das Lichtkabinett, Berlin 1967
- An meinem Fall scheitert die offizielle Kunstgeschichte, Frankfurt 1969
- Seuche gebannt – zur Historie einiger Begriffe, Berlin.

== See also ==
- List of German painters
