= Joboland =

Amusement park in Denmark

Brandesgårdshaven
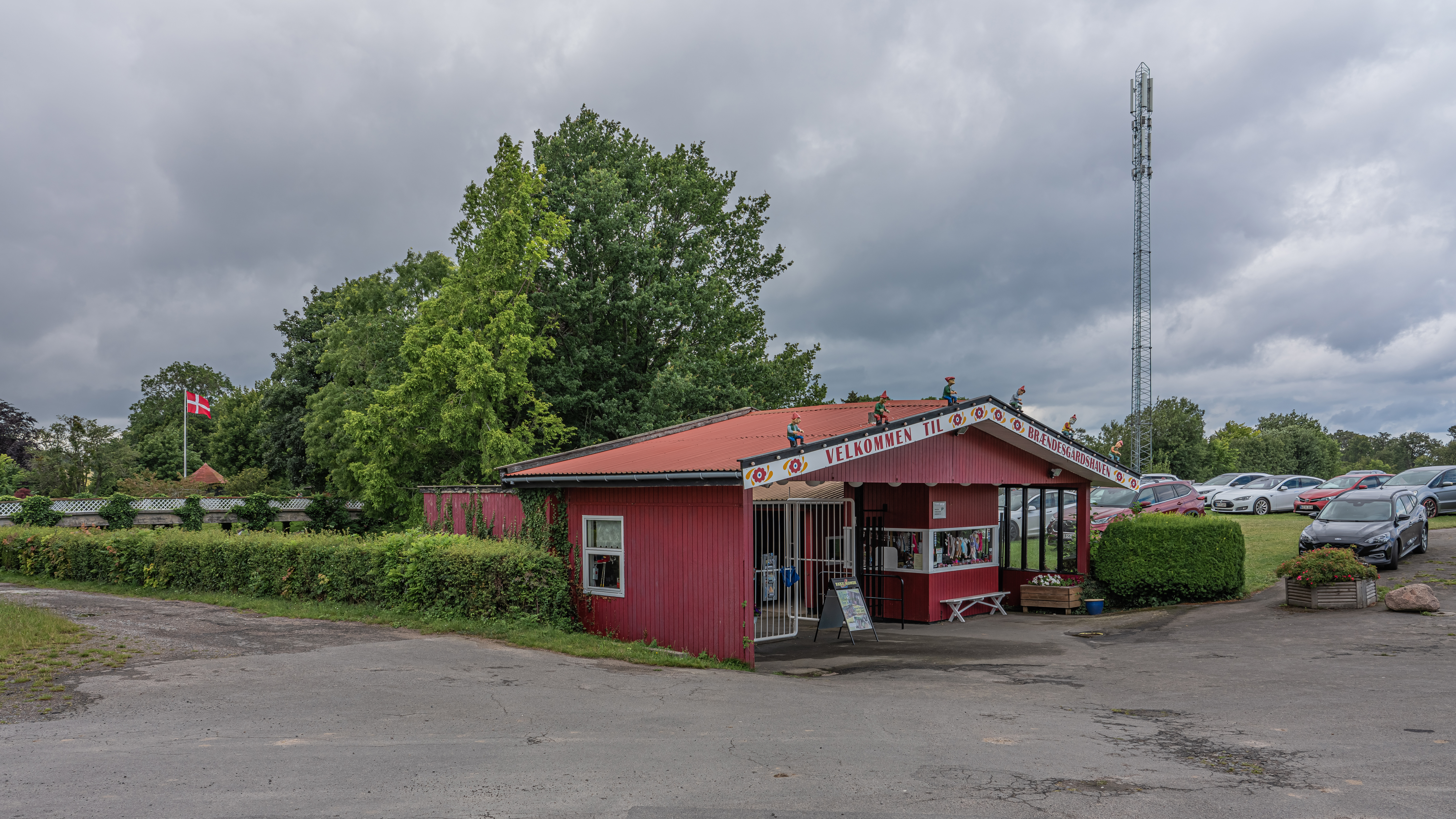
- Entrance of Brandesgårdshaven
- Interactive map of Brandesgårdshaven
- Location: Svaneke, Denmark
- Coordinates: 55°07′45″N 15°06′13″E
- Opened: 1933 (1904); 1933 (public)
- Website: https://www.braendesgaardshaven.com/

Brandesgårdshaven, also known as Joboland, is an amusement park with gardens, a zoo and a playground located 3 kilometres (1.9 mi) west of Svaneke on the Danish island of Bornholm.

== History ==
The area was once a well-run farm which can be traced back to the 16th century. Around the beginning of the 20th century, beautifully laid out gardens became a status symbol for Danish farmers. In 1904, Emil Ipsen (1882-1961), who kept up with the times, modernized the farm, cultivated plants on the banks of the stream known as Vaseåen and in 1910 dammed it up, providing the means of generating electricity for himself and his neighbours. The dam also created the pretty lake with its rowing boats. Originally it was used by Ipsen's children. He built a pedal boat for them as well as a play house in the middle of the lake.

As time went by, the fine gardens became the talk of the island, attracting visitors from afar. In 1929 and 1932, the farmers' association held their annual meeting there. As a result, and encouraged by difficult times for agriculture, Ipsen and his wife decided to open the garden to the public. They charged visitors 25 øre for entry. It was a huge success, attracting some 21,000 visitors the first year, three times as many the following year and further increases in the years up to World War II (1939-1945). Rowing boats and rides for the children were added. After World War II, there were more facilities, not just for the Bornholmers but for an increasing number of tourists from the rest of Denmark. When Ipsen died in 1961, followed by his wife two years later, their son and daughter-in-law, Ewald Ipsen and Ana, took the park over. The new owners extended the gardens and brought in animals. The park also attracted pop artists who held concerts there, often in association with sports clubs.

In 1972, the third generation of Ipsens, Lillian and Hans Emil, continued the park's operations, bringing in new attractions but keeping the old hand-operated roundabout and the rowing boats. To keep up with the times, they enlarged the buildings, laid out a minigolf course and brought in a magician for daily performances. Finally, they developed a 5,000 square metres (54,000 sq ft) waterland with slides, a crazy river and a special section for children, so succeeding in maintaining interest. Recently there have been caves with jobos (on Bornholm, a jobo is an underground being) and jobo exercising circuits.

== 21st century ==
Joboland has a watersports area, animals including monkeys, lamas, oxen, coatis, goats and rabbits, and a daily magic show. The park is open most days from mid-May to mid-September.
