= Zoo di Napoli =

Zoo in Naples, Italy

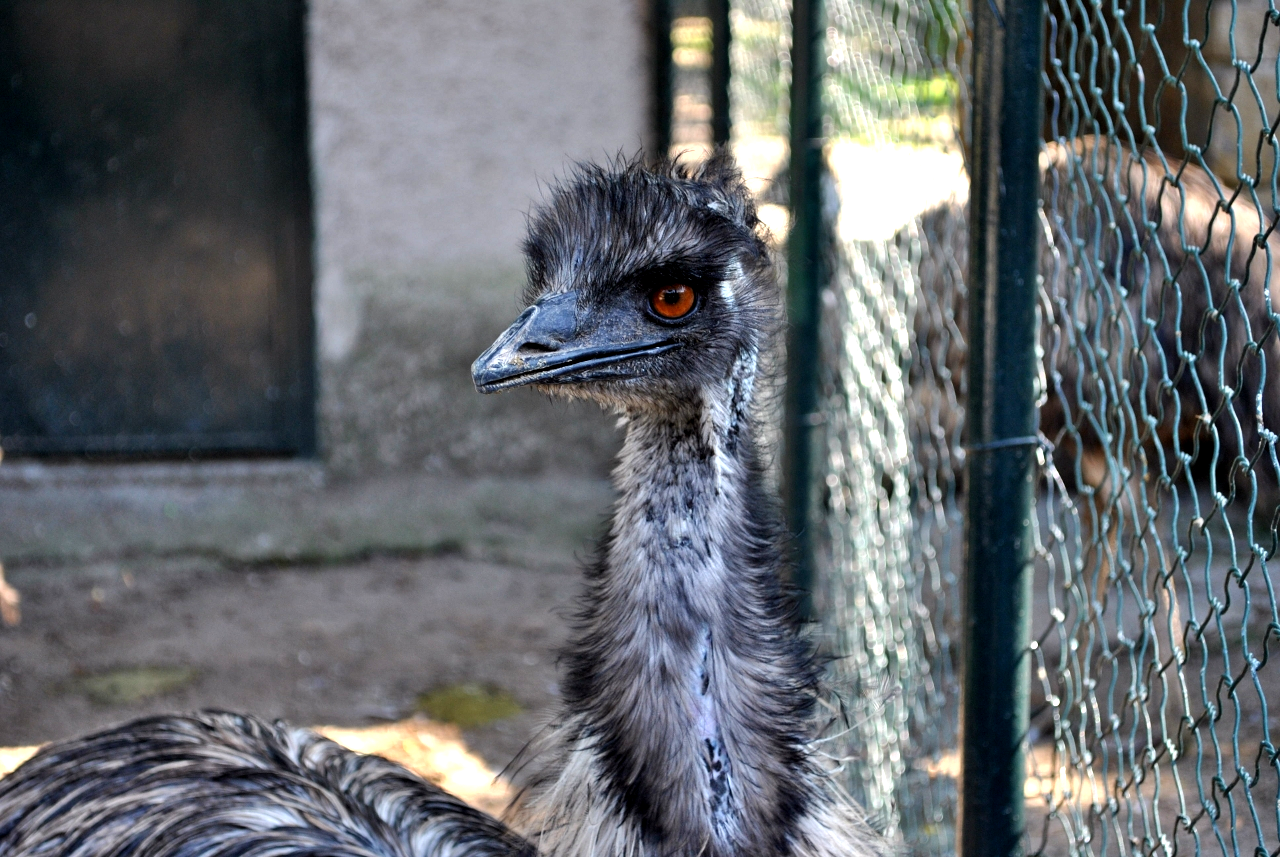
- Emu of the Zoo
- Interactive map of Zoo di Napoli
- Type: Zoo
- Location: Naples, Italy
- Coordinates: 40°49′26″N 14°10′50″E
- Area: 100.000 m^{2} (1,076.39 sq ft)
- Created: 1940
- Status: Open all year

The Zoo di Napoli (English: Naples Zoo) is a zoo in Naples, Campania, southern Italy, created by Franco Cuneo and Angelo Lombardi in 1940 (then closed and opened for a second time in 1949 after the Second World War) over an area of 100,000 square metres (25 acres).

== Gallery ==
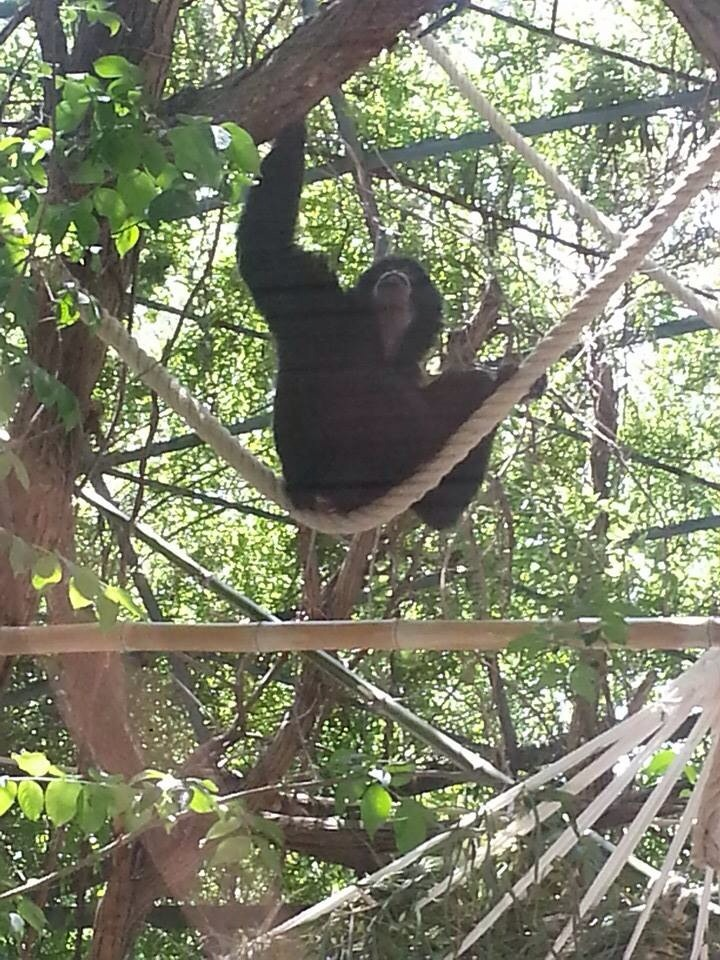
Siamang
