= Svaneke =

- Town
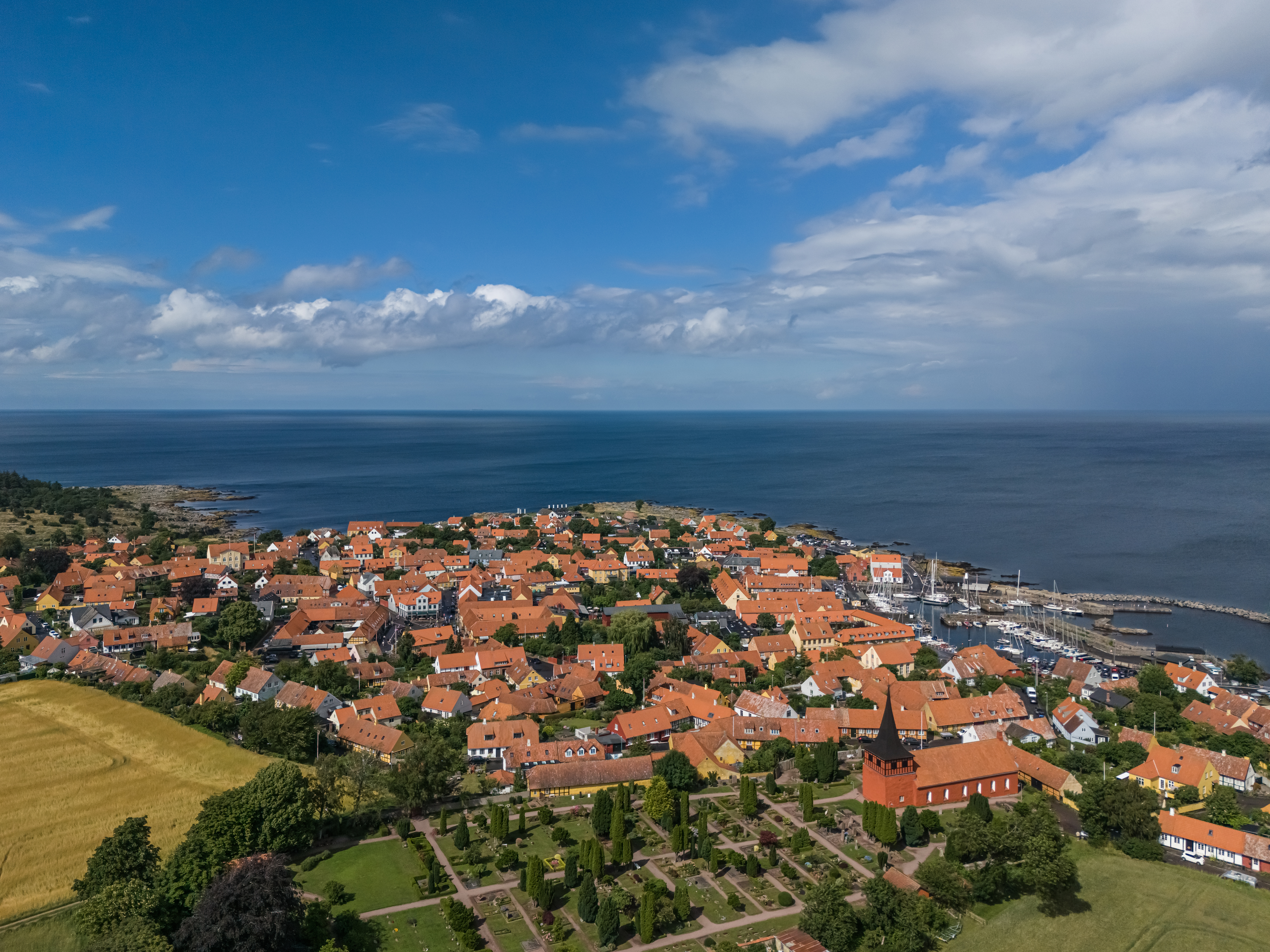
- Aerial view, 2024

- Flag Coat of arms

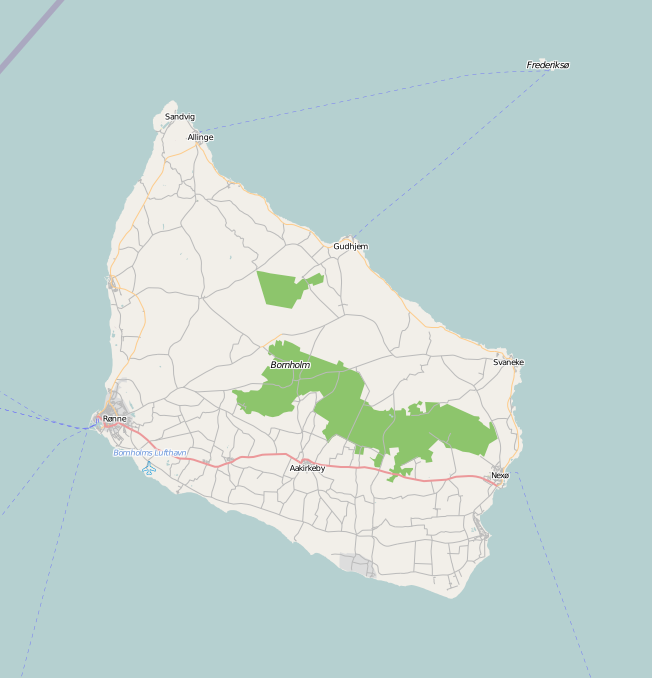
- Location on Bornholm
- Coordinates: 55°08′N 15°08′E
- Country: Denmark
- Region: Capital (Hovedstaden)
- Municipality: Bornholm

Area
  - Urban: 0.27 sq mi (0.7 km^{2})

Population (2026)
  - Urban: 1,074
  - Urban density: 4,000/sq mi (1,500/km^{2})
- Time zone: UTC+1 (CET)
  - Summer (DST): UTC+2 (CEST)

Svaneke (Swencke in 1410, from old Danish swan swan and *wīka inlet) is a small town on the eastern coast of the Baltic island of Bornholm, Denmark. It lies mainly in Svaneke parish and partly in Ibsker parish.

It is Denmark's easternmost town. It is also the second smallest chartered town in Denmark, with a population of 1,074 as of 1 January 2026. Only Ærøskøbing is smaller.

== History ==
Svaneke probably dates back to the 12th to 13th century when herring fishing was practiced along Bornholm's east coast. The precise date at which it was granted the market town status is unknown but it was no doubt at the beginning of the 16th century as by 1543 it had a mayor and a municipal council. In 1610, almost half the town was destroyed by fire. During the brief period of February 26, 1658 - May 27, 1660, Svaneke, together with the rest of Bornholm, was part of the Swedish Empire. In 1801, the population was still only 663 but this figure doubled in the 19th century as the new harbour (1816) provided enhanced opportunities for shipbuilding.

It was in the 18th and 19th centuries that trade and shipbuilding expanded in Svaneke, resulting in the construction of the fine merchants' houses which still line the harbour. Unlike many of the other towns in Bornholm, Svaneke escaped modernization following the opening of the island's railways at the beginning of the 20th century. Its old-world look was further protected towards the end of the century by "The Friends of Svaneke" who prevented inappropriate renovation work.

== Tourism ==
Svaneke owes its current prosperity to tourism, thanks to the well-preserved town centre that earned it the European Architectural Heritage Gold Medal in 1975. Red-roofed, yellow lime-washed, half-timbered houses line the narrow streets, which wind down to the harbour and up to the church. The town is also a centre for arts and crafts such as glassblowing and ceramics. There are also a few small sweet factories and a miniature brewery.

There are also several footpaths along the rocky coast as well as cycle tracks to all parts of the island. Accommodations include two camping sites, a hotel, and holiday apartments as well as restaurants, cafés, and pubs. The local smokehouse is a popular venue.

To the west of Svaneke is the Joboland amusement park, which has a waterpark, petting zoo, merry-go-rounds, and rowing boats.

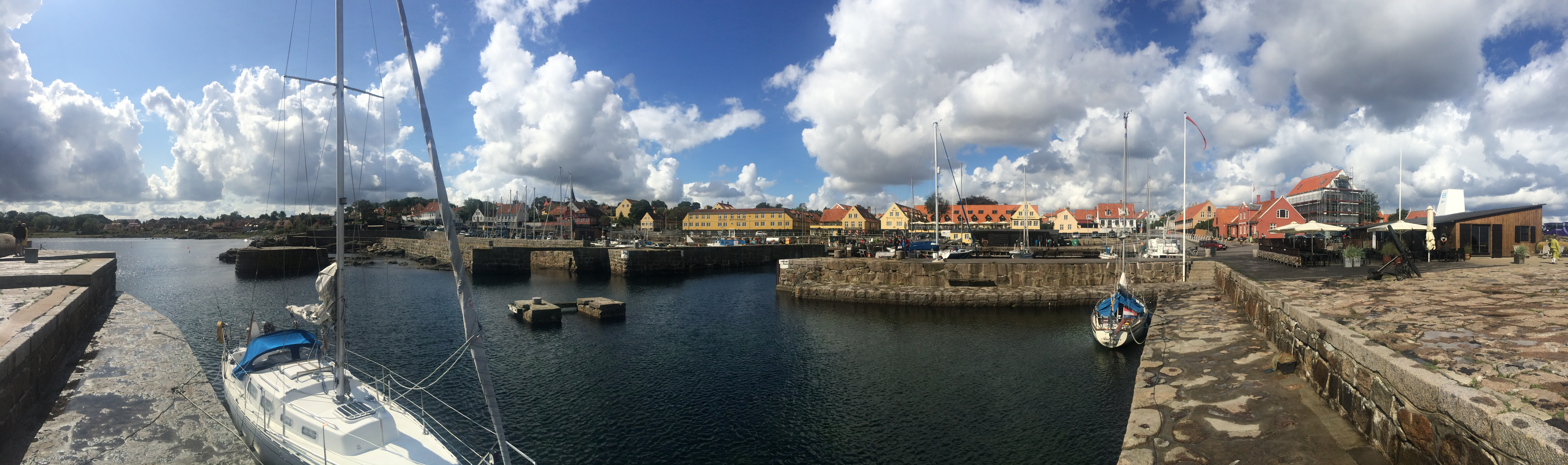
Svaneke Havn
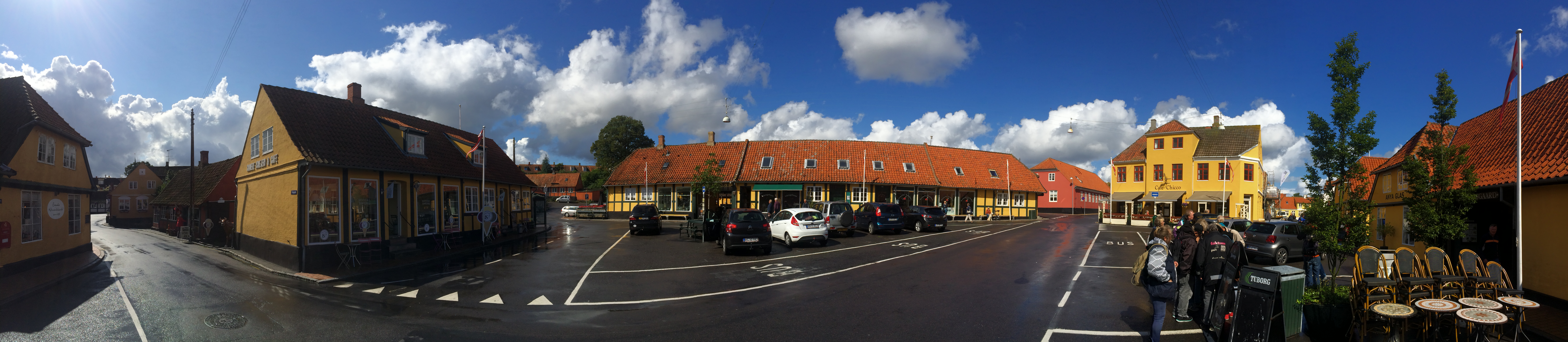
Svaneke Torv

== Other attractions ==
=== The water tower ===
Designed by award-winning architect Jørn Utzon, Svaneke's water tower was built in 1952. It was inspired by the old sea marks used to assist ships' navigation at sea. The beacons were used along the Jutish West coast since the end of the 16th century when no other distinguishable markings existed on the coast.

The pyramidal water tank is supported by three slender ferro-concrete legs that meet at the top of the tower. The centrally placed steps, also made of concrete, wind up elegantly from the ground. The water tower was taken out of service in 1988 when alterations to the water supply system were introduced. Since 1992, it has been a listed building.

=== St Ib's Church ===
St Ib's Church (Sankt Ibs kirke), 3 km south-west of Svaneke, is a fine 12th century Romanesque building. The altarpiece was painted by Christoffer Wilhelm Eckersberg in 1846 with a picture of Christ in the garden of Gethsemane. The Renaissance pulpit (ca 1600) was decorated by Paul Høm in 1964 with ceramics of the four evangelists.

=== Windmills ===
Bechs Mølle, the timbered post mill which stands high above the town on the road to Gudhjem, was built in 1629 making it the oldest preserved windmill in Denmark. In the 18th century, it was one of three such mills just north of the town. It takes its name from Hans Bentzen Bech who took it over in 1814. Initially, the mill stood on the edge of the cliff but was moved back when the road was built in 1866. On that occasion, the mill was positioned on a tripod support and received highly developed works. Since 1960, it has been a listed building. Restoration work was carried out in 1972-1973 and between 2002 and 2007.

Svanemøllen, located just outside the town on the road to Østermarie, was built in 1857 and served until the 1950s. A listed building, it is the island's finest wooden smock mill with its onion cap and cladding of oak shingles. It is now in the hands of the local association Svanekes Venner (Svaneke's Friends) who have kept it in good repair.

=== Svaneke Church ===
Svaneke Church stands 18 m above the harbour on the site of a small chapel that appears to have existed for quite sometime before the town received its charter in the 16th century. It was expanded over the years, the tower and spire being completed in 1789. In 1881, virtually the whole building was rebuilt by architect Mathias Bidstrup of Rønne, leaving only the tower and a small section of the south wall.

=== Svaneke Lighthouse ===
The lighthouse, completed in 1919, is located to the southeast of the harbour. It is square-shaped rather than round, reaching an overall height of 18 metres (59 ft). In 2010, the lighthouse was taken out of commission and is now privately owned.

== Gallery ==
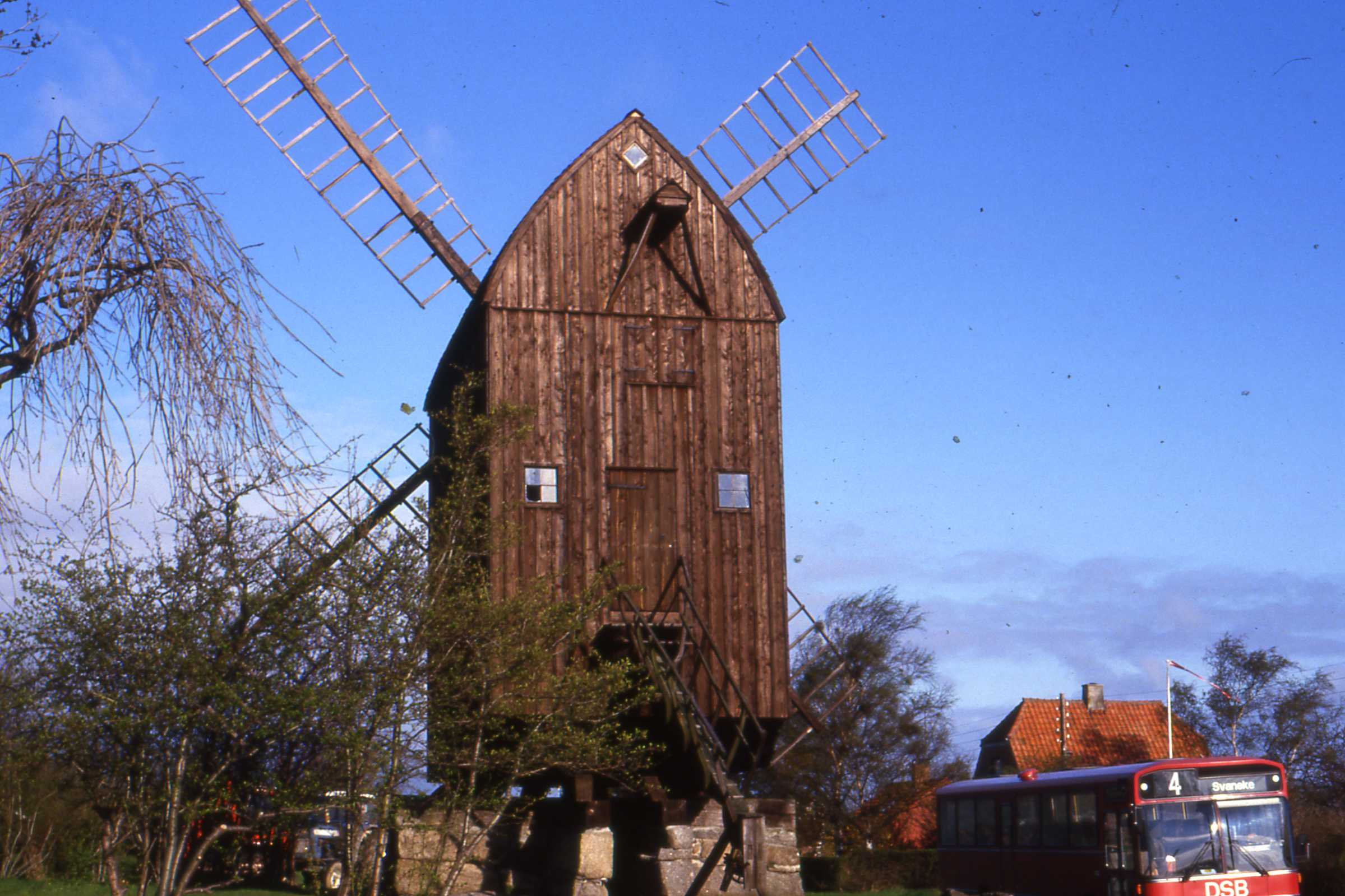
Oldest windmill in Denmark

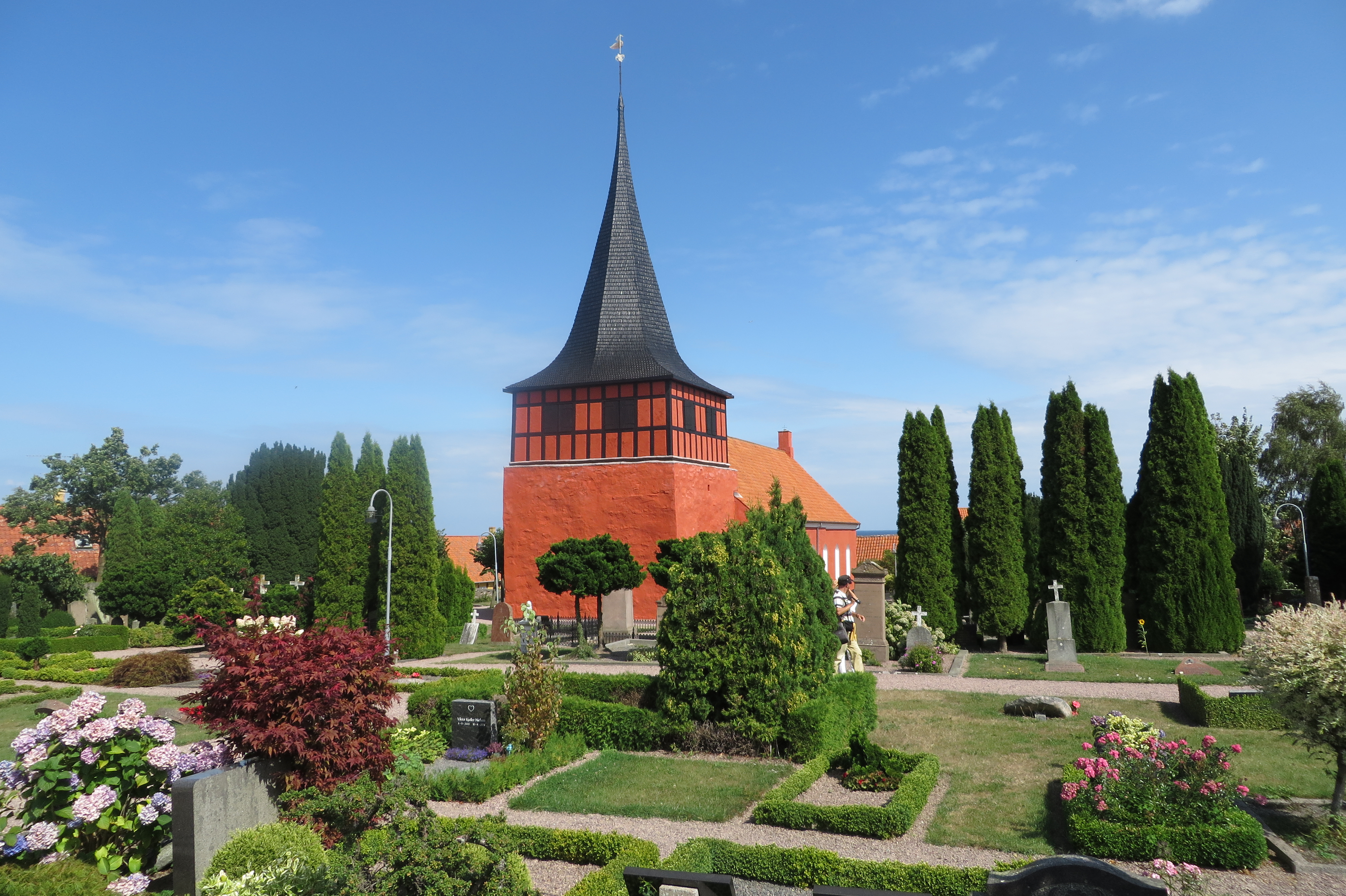
Svaneke Church

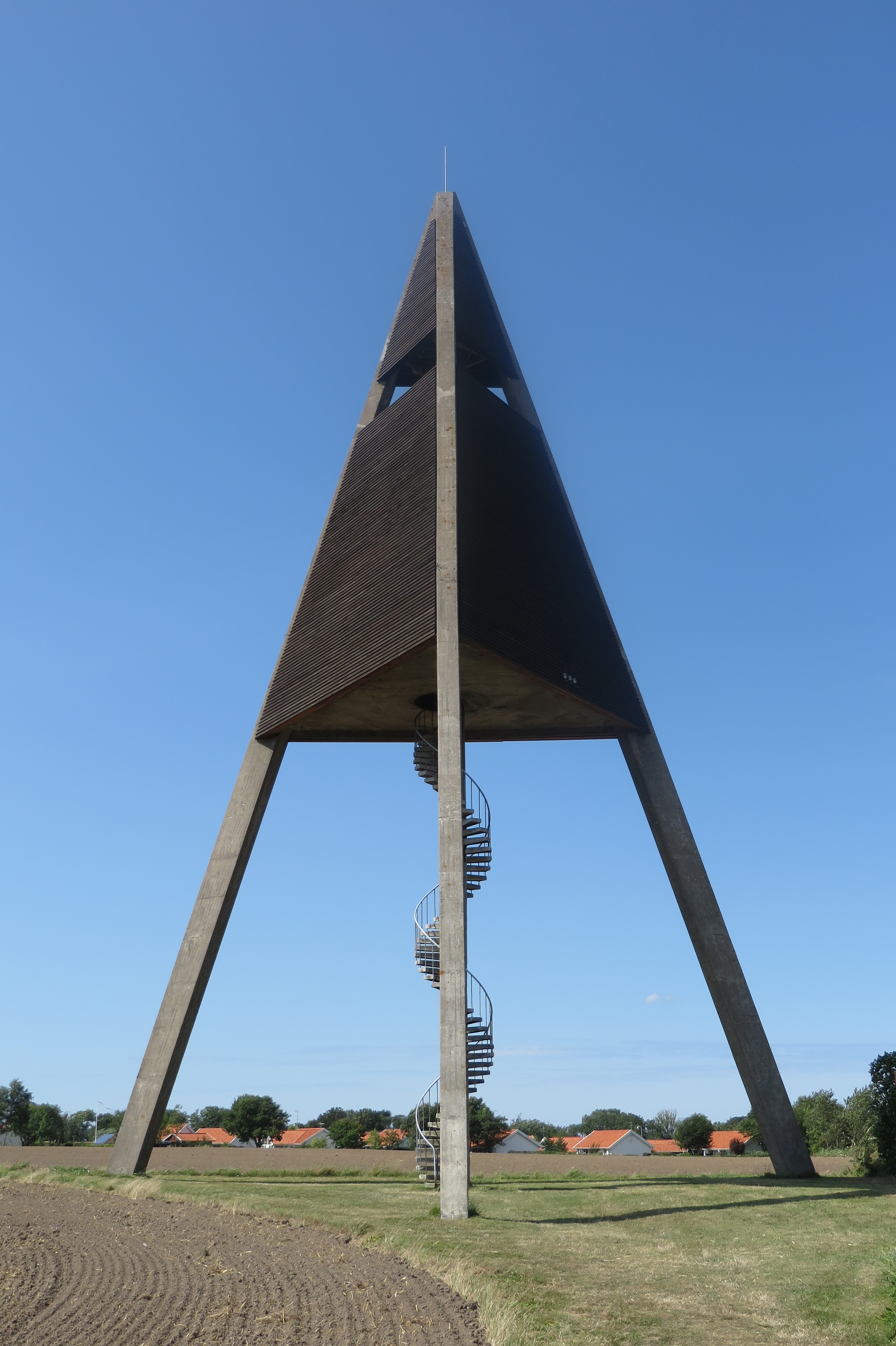
Water tower designed by Jørn Utzon

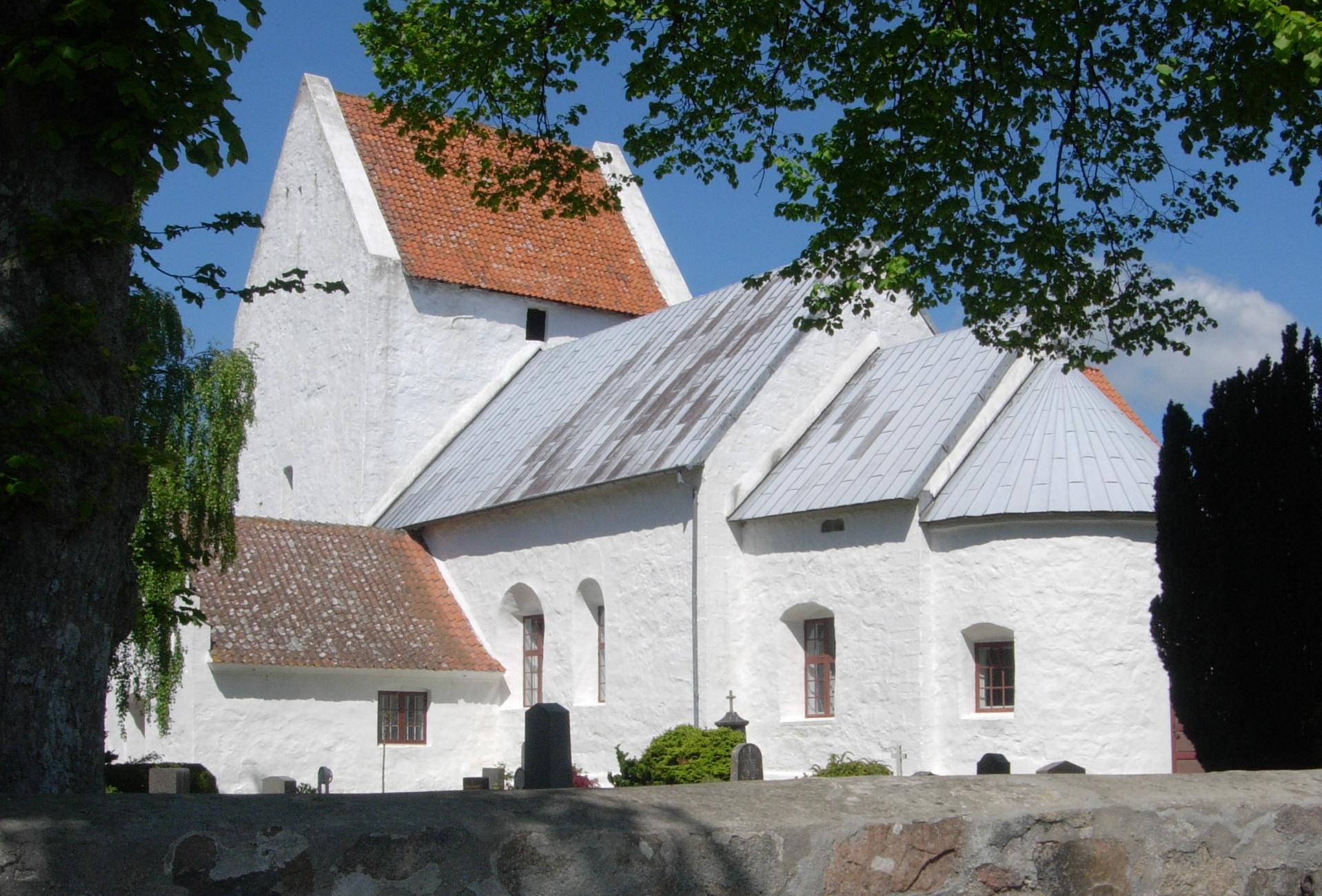
St Ib's Church

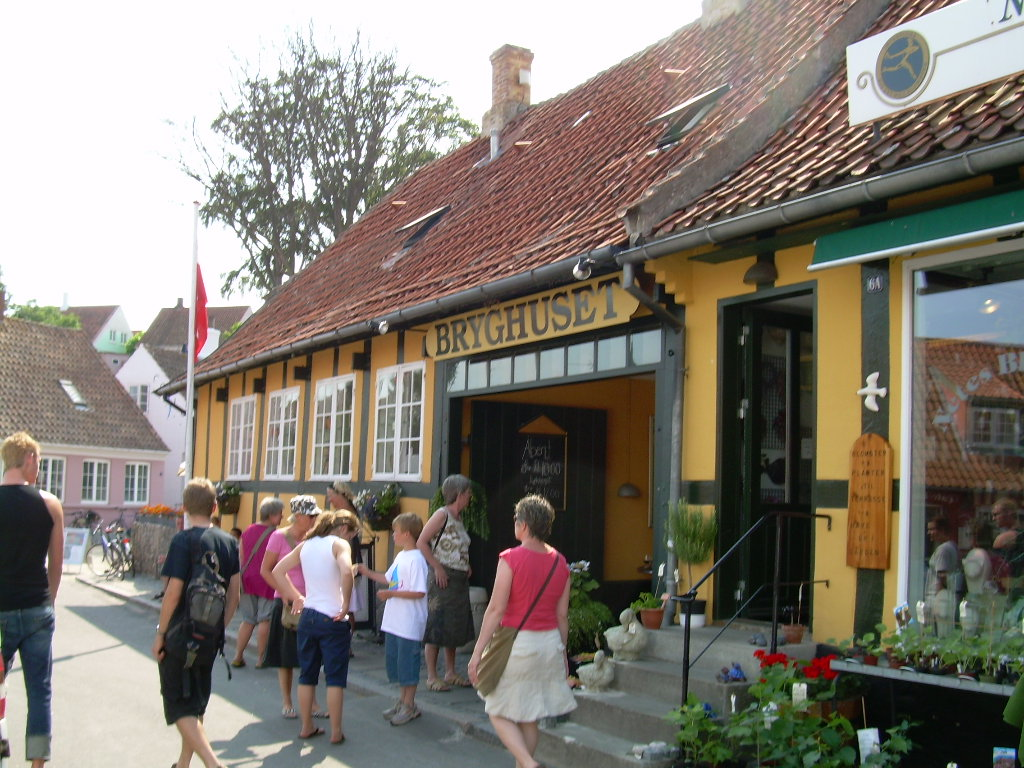
The brewery on the marketplace

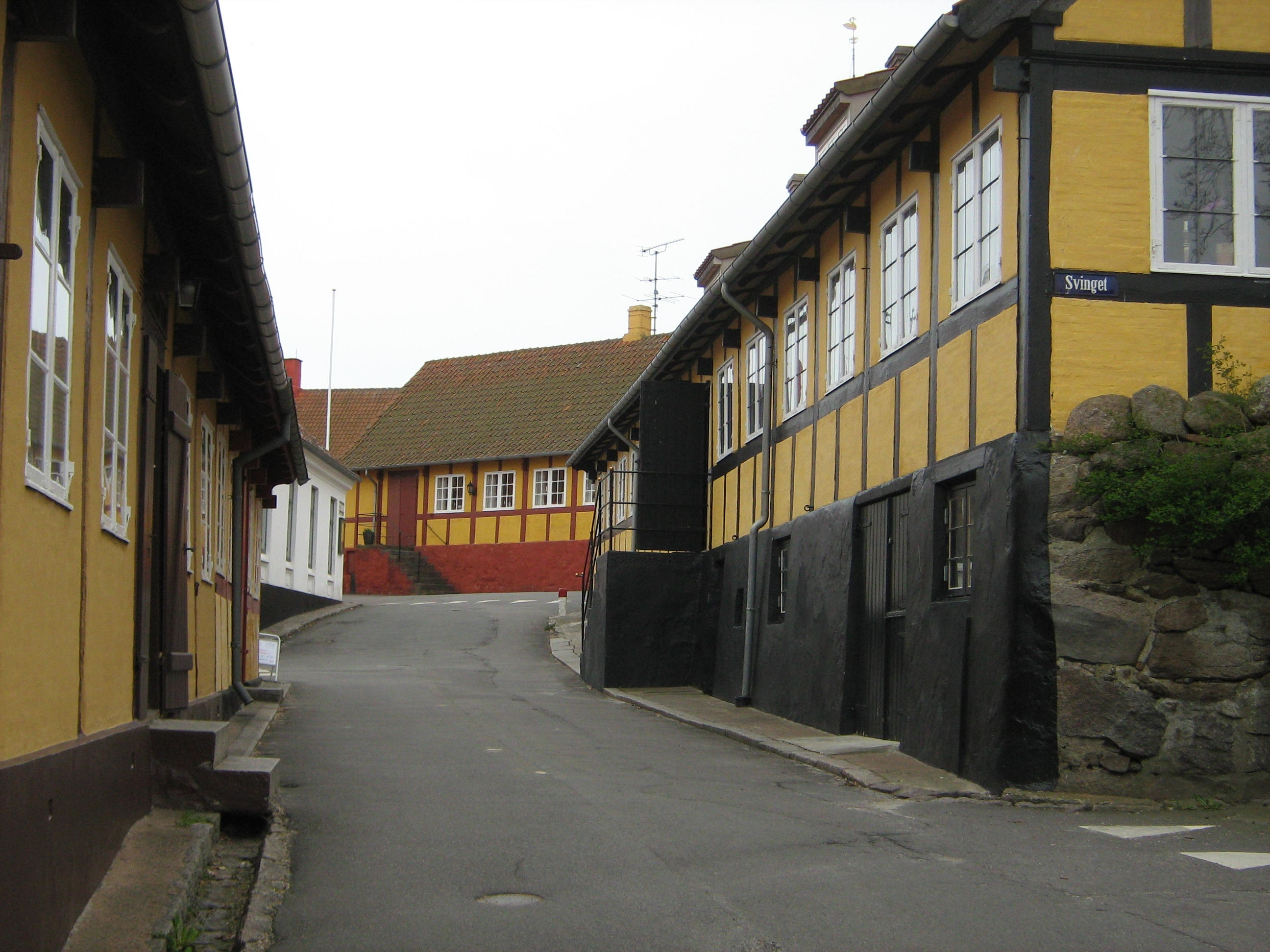
Old street in Svaneke

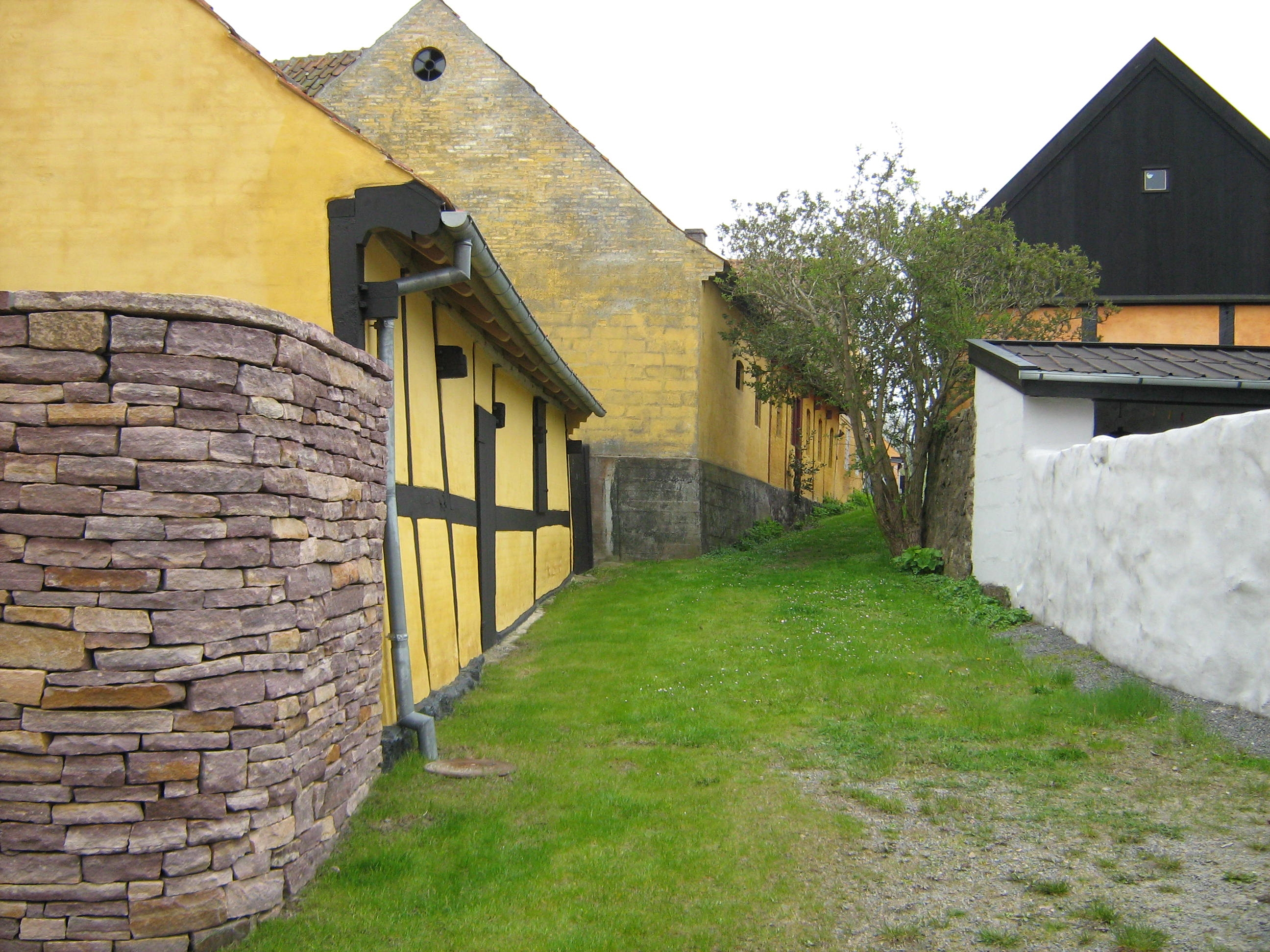
Half-timbered houses

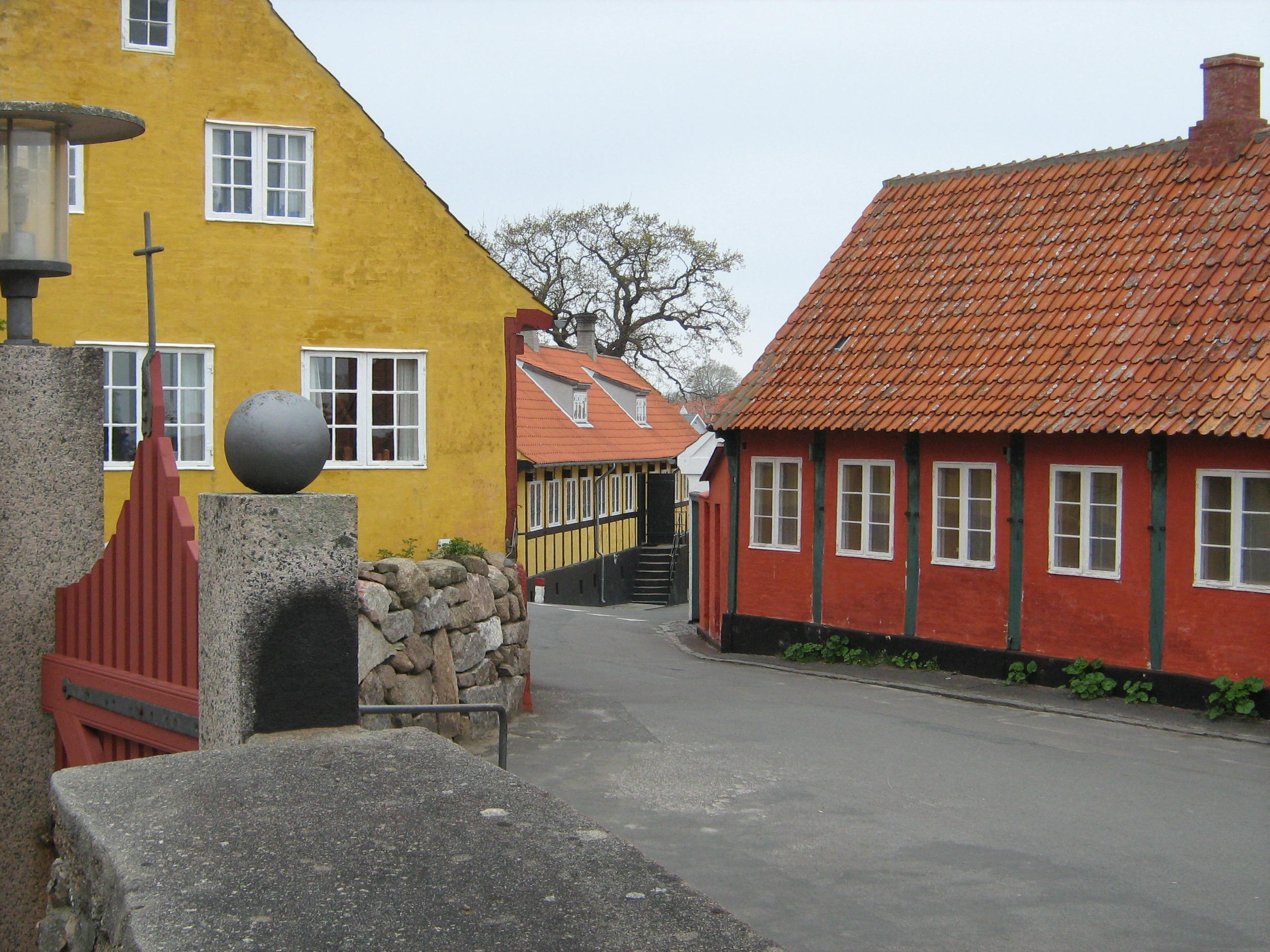
Outside the church gate
