= Wręcza =

- Village
- Location within Poland
- Coordinates: 52°0′N 20°28′E
- Country: Poland
- Voivodeship: Masovian
- County: Żyrardów
- Gmina: Mszczonów

Wręcza [ˈvrɛnt͡ʂa] is a village in the administrative district of Gmina Mszczonów, within Żyrardów County, Masovian Voivodeship, in east-central Poland.

Wręcza is most known for having the Park of Poland water park which opened on February 20, 2020.
