= Park of Poland =

Leisure park in Masovian Voivodeship, Poland

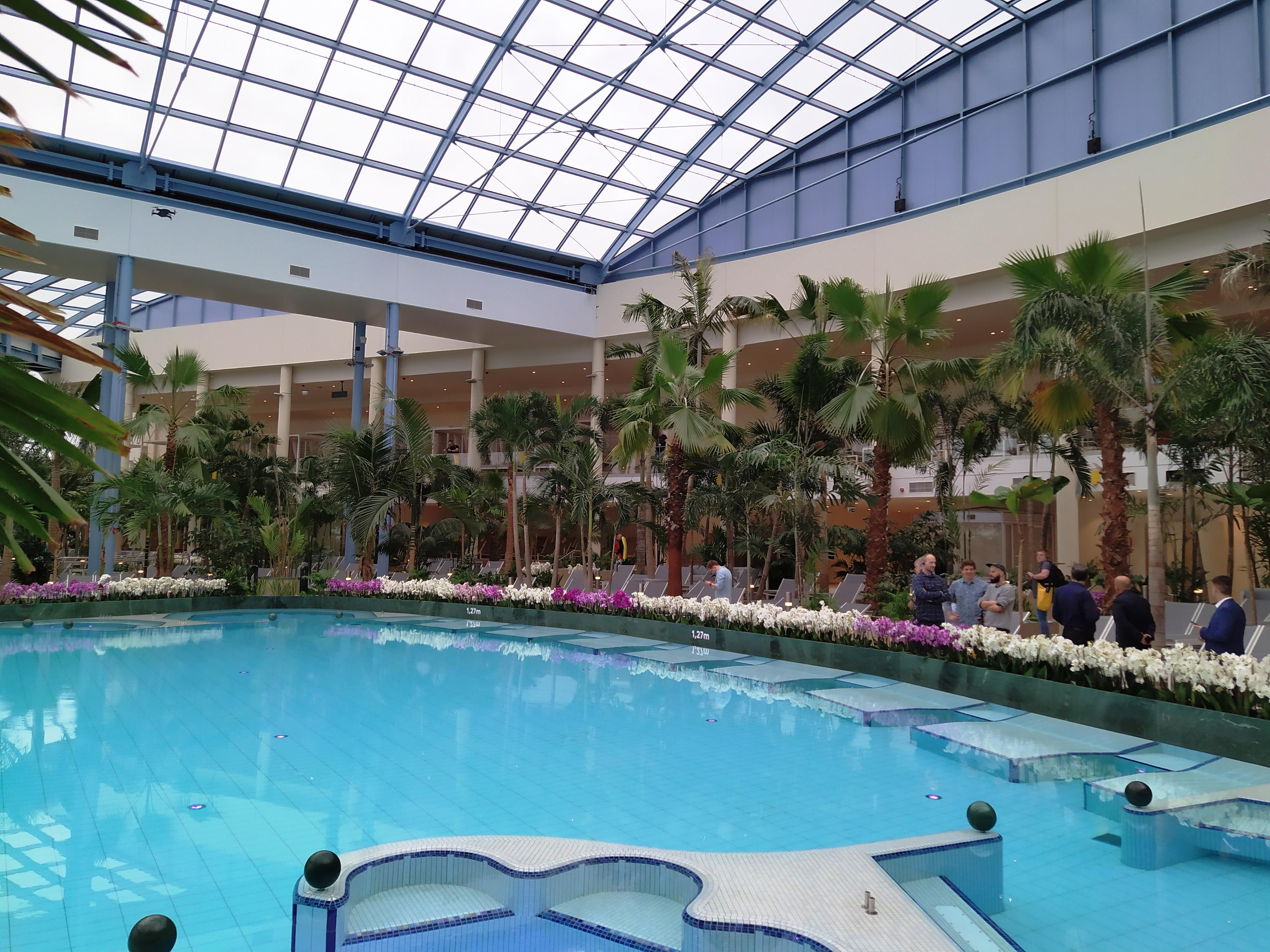
- "Suntago Wodny Świat" - swimming pools

General information
- Location: Wręcza, Masovian Voivodeship, Poland, Nowy Świat 1
- Coordinates: 51°59′16″N 20°27′31″E
- Construction started: 2017
- Completed: 2020 (Suntago Wodny Świat, Suntago Village)
- Opened: 20/02/2020
- Cost: €150 million ($180 million)
- Owner: Global Parks Poland Sp. z o.o.

Website
- https://parkofpoland.com/en/

Park of Poland (also known as Suntago) is an amusement and leisure park in central Poland, in the village of Wręcza in Żyrardów County, Masovian Voivodeship, about 50 kilometres (31 mi) southwest of the capital Warsaw. It is the largest indoor water park in Europe.

== Construction ==
Plans to build the amusement park were first laid out in 2011, and it was projected to employ 600 people. Construction was scheduled to commence in 2013, but was delayed until 2017. The first phase of the project, Suntago Wodny Świat (lit. 'Suntago Water World') was completed in 2019, costing 170 million euro, taking 37,000 cubic metres (1,300,000 cu ft) of concrete and 5,000 tonnes of steel. It opened on February 20, 2020.

== Complex ==
Park of Poland covers an area of nearly 400 hectares (990 acres), purchased by the investor Global City Holdings. Currently, the first part of the complex is in operation, Suntago Wodny Świat, covering an area of 20 hectares (49 acres) including parking, along with Suntago Village, a village of 92 bungalows, opened in spring 2020. Plans have also been made to construct a 4-star hotel.

=== Suntago Wodny Świat ===
Suntago Wodny Świat (lit. 'Suntago Water World') is split into 3 themed zones: Jamango, Relax and Saunaria. It is the largest covered water park in Poland and Europe.

The park is open every day and has a capacity of 15,000 people.

==== Jamango Wodna Dżungla ====
Jamango Wodna Dżungla (lit. 'Jamango Water Jungle') is an area with water slides, lazy rivers, a wave pool, a surfing simulator and an indoor and outdoor water park playground.

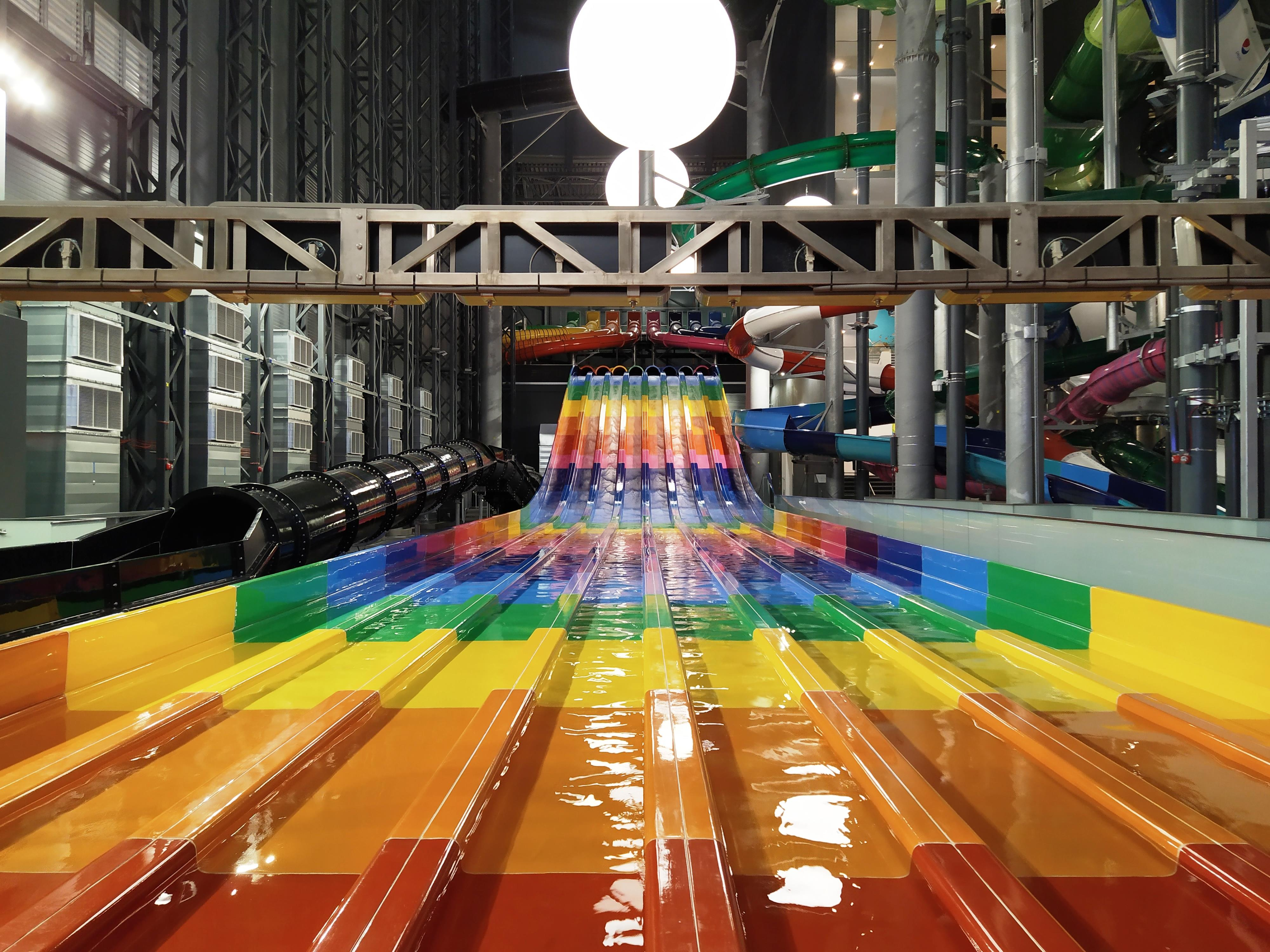
The Rainbow Race 8-lane racing slide.

There are 35 water slides with a combined length of over 3.2 kilometres (2.0 mi), the longest of which is the Jungle Eclipse, measuring 256 metres (840 ft) in length. There are also inflatable ring slides, trapdoor slides and an 8-lane racing slide. The slides are spread out over 6 stories.

The combined area of the pools totals 2,000 m².

==== Relax ====
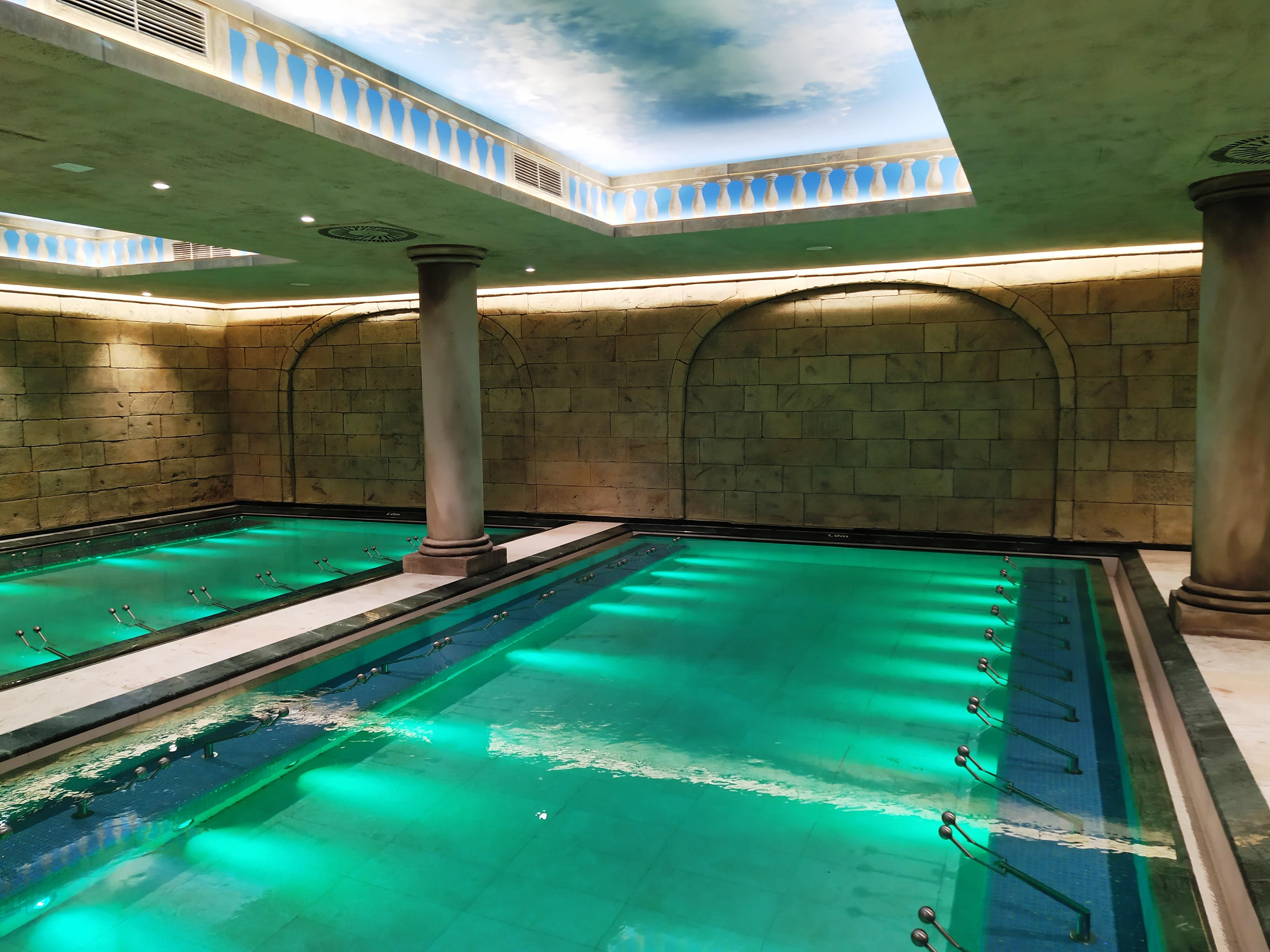
Dead Sea brine pool

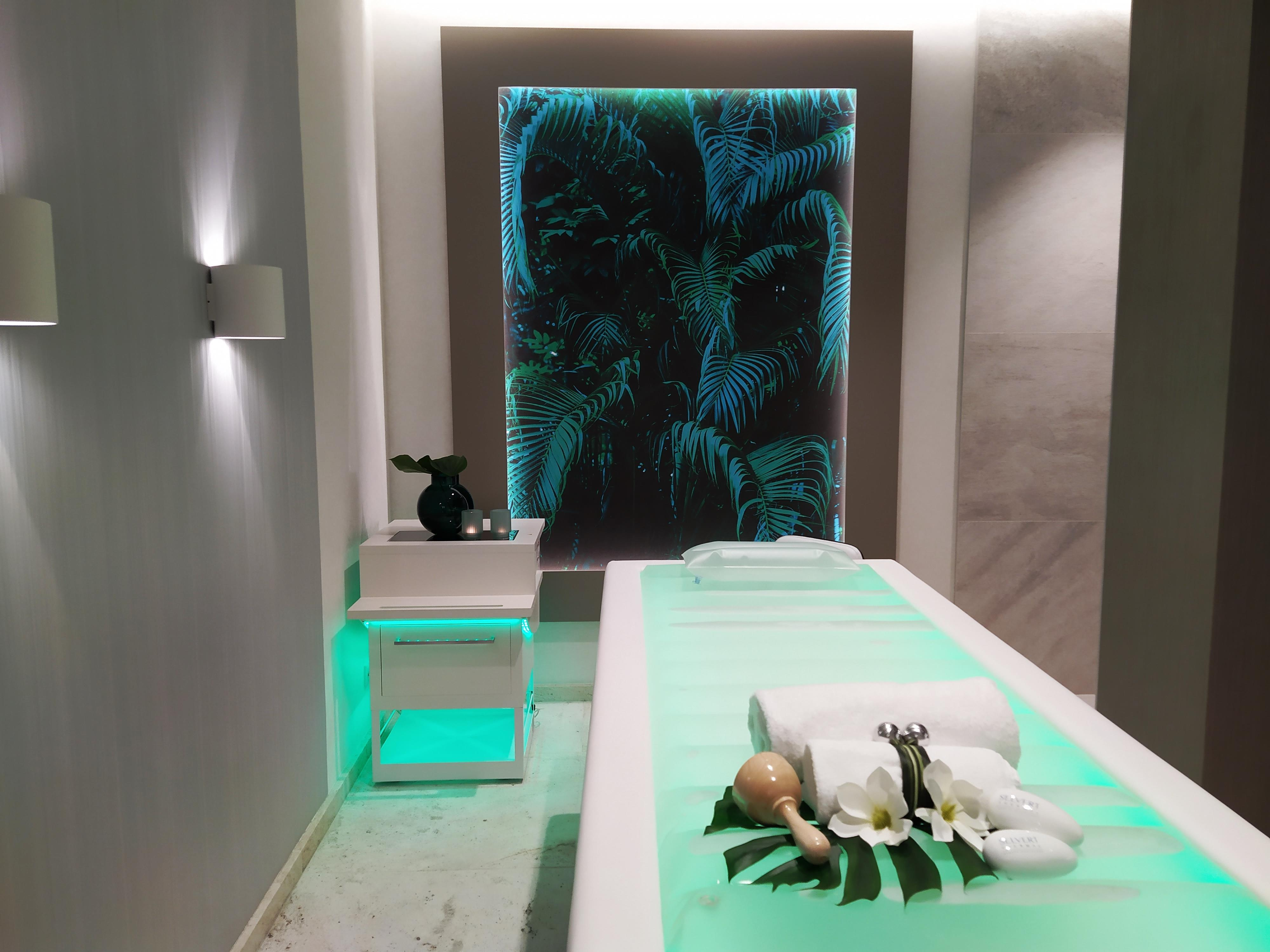
Spa

This zone is designed for relaxation. There is a thermal pool with jacuzzi and hydromassage, a spa, a sulfur pool and "Dead Sea" saltwater pools. There is also a garden of 20,000 square metres (220,000 sq ft).

==== Saunaria ====
There are a total of 12 saunas and steam room, each based around their own different theme.

== Accommodation ==
=== Suntago Village ===
There is a complex of 92 self-catering bungalows, connected to the main park by shuttle bus.

=== Hotel ===
Plans for the construction of a 4-star hotel with 240 rooms, complete with conference rooms and connected to Suntago have also been made.

== Location ==
The complex is located near Mszczonów, about 50 kilometres (31 mi) from Warsaw city centre and over 100 kilometres (62 mi) from Łódź. Park of Poland is located between the S8 expressway and the A2 motorway. In 2018, the Mszczonów and Radziejowice communes, funded by grants from the Masovian Voivodeship, built a road linking the water park with the National road 50.
