= Germendorf =

- Village of Oranienburg
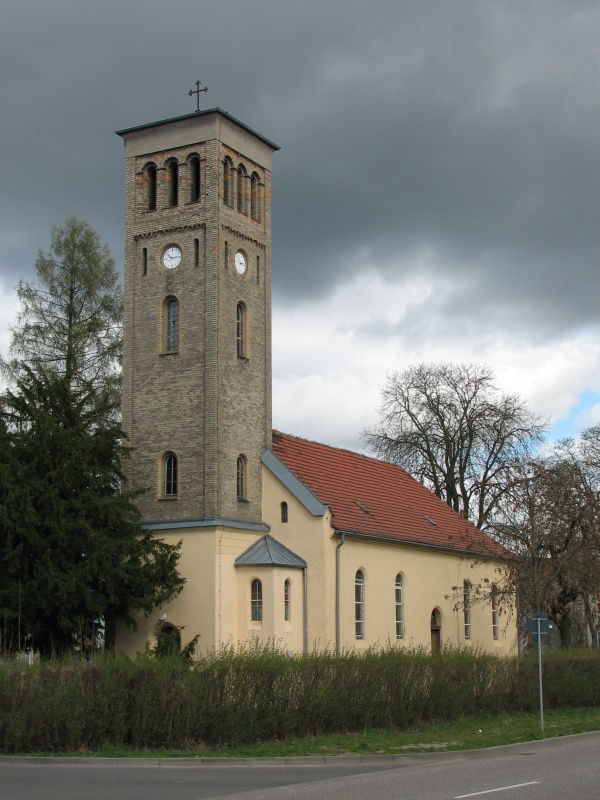

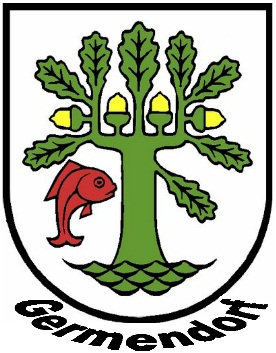
- Coat of arms
- Interactive map of Germendorf
- Location within Germany Location within Brandenburg
- Coordinates: 52°44′N 13°10′E
- Country: Germany
- State: Brandenburg
- District: Oberhavel
- Town: Oranienburg

Area
  - Total: 15 km^{2} (5.8 sq mi)
- Elevation: 36 m (118 ft)

Population (2008-12-31)
  - Total: 1,818
  - Density: 120/km^{2} (310/sq mi)
- Time zone: UTC+01:00 (CET)
  - Summer (DST): UTC+02:00 (CEST)
- Postal codes: 16515
- Dialling codes: 03301
- Vehicle registration: OHV

Germendorf is a part of Oranienburg, a town in the district of Oberhavel in northern Brandenburg, Germany. In 2008, Germendorf had a population of 1,818.

== Geography ==
Germendorf is located west of the main town of Oranienburg, and stretches from the River Muhre to the Ländchen Glien (Germendorfer Sander) with a total area of 1,528 hectares, of which only 207 hectares are populated. The village is located at the transition between the Havel lowland, which is characterized by populated and agricultural areas, and the area to its west, which is higher and wooded. To the west of Germendorf is a gravel quarry, which has been used since 1928 on land that used to belong to the artist Erich Buchholz.

== History ==
The first documentary mention of Germendorf is in 1395, under the name Gerwendorff, in the Landbuch der Mark-Brandenburg of Charles IV. Over the following years, Germendorf the name changed several times and was known variously as Germendorff, Gerbendorff (1450), Gerwendorpp (1480) and Gerbendorff.

The settlement was destroyed several times by fire, and a large part of the village was destroyed during the Thirty Years' War (1618–1648). The brick church in the centre of the village, which is now under a preservation order as a building of historic interest, was built in 1739, after the former church was destroyed by fire. In 1861, the church tower had to be rebuilt after the old tower was destroyed by another fire.

For hundreds of years, up until the 20th century, the village of Germendorf was centred on the village green. In 1915, Germendorf got its own railway station after the opening of a railway line between Oranienburg and Kremmen. This meant that Germendorf effectively moved closer to Berlin and this facilitated the first wave of population growth. It also changed the appearance of the village, with new residential areas for workers.

During the second industrial revolution in the first part of the 20th century, Heinkel Flugzeugwerke (Heinkel Airplane Works) built assembly shops to the south of Germendorf. Under the Nazis, between 6,200 and 8,000 prisoners of the Sachsenhausen concentration camp had to perform forced labour in the aircraft works. In 1974, a memorial stone was erected on the road to Velten, in memory of the more than 1,500 prisoners who were killed

In April 1945, during the Second World War, Germendorf was part of a massive Russian offensive. On 22 April 1945, the Russian lines were north of Spandau in Hennigsdorf, Hohen-Neuendorf and Birkenwerder. Oranienburg was surrounded by Russian troops coming from the south, who were trying to push forward into the southern part of Oranienburg. As part of the pincer movement towards Berlin, the Russian army tried to press forward westwards across a broad front and were positioned at the "Ruppiner Kanal" (Ruppin Ship Canal). On 23 April 1945, a German bridgehead, known as the Oranienburg Bridgehead, was still held at the southern side of the "Ruppiner Kanal" to the north of Germendorf.

During the night, Russian troops concentrated at Schwante and in the Kremmener Forst. Up until 24 April, further German troops were moved into the area north of Oranienburg. Most of the German soldiers were young and inexperienced. On 25 April, the German Oranienburg Bridgehead advanced in order to disrupt the pincer movement of the Russian army. After numerous heavy battles, however, it was stopped at the railway line north of Germendorf. The heavy fighting continued into the next day. The Russian counterattack became stronger and in the following days Oranienburg, Germendorf, Friedrichsthal and Velten were taken.

After the fall of the Berlin Wall and subsequent integration of East Germany into the Federal Republic of Germany, Germendorf experienced an increase in the population resulting from suburbanisation. Many people moved from Oranienburg or Berlin to Germendorf because of cheap housing and the proximity to Berlin. Since 26 October 2006, Germendorf has been part of Oranienburg and has the same postcode. In the last 10 years, numerous business enterprises have moved to Germendorf and generated hundreds of new jobs. As of 2006, there were 197 companies registered in Germendorf.

== Leisure ==
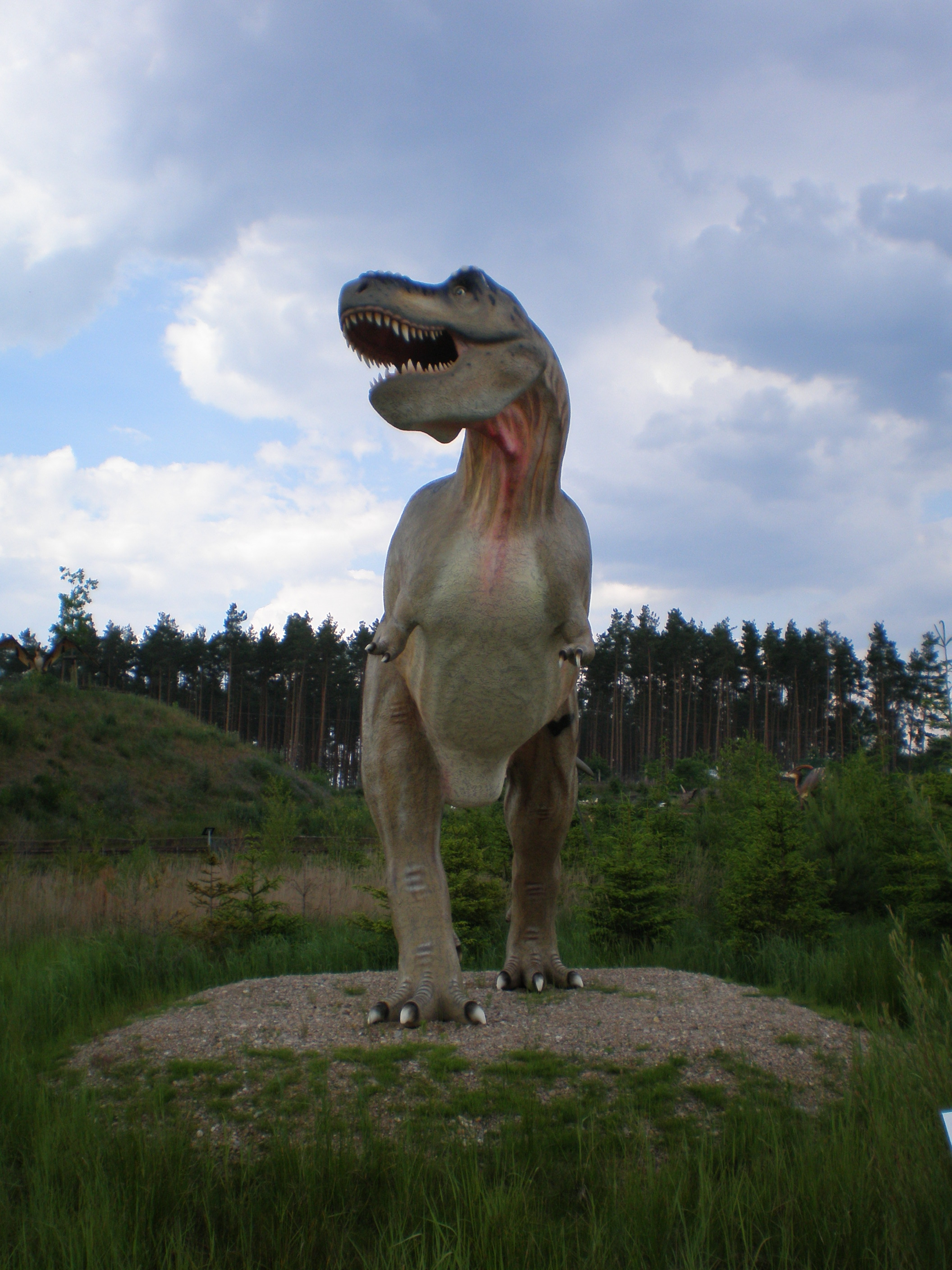
A Tyrannosaurus in the "Wildtierpark Germendorf"

Germendorf is best known for the Germendorf Wildlife Park, an animal park with 600 animals of 40 different species, native and exotic. The wildlife park also has a lake and a hotel.

The founder and owner of the park is the former village elder, Horst Eichholz (born 4 November 1932). Initially used mainly as a lakeside recreation area, the animal park was established in 2000 after the original site was extended and restructured. The wildlife park, with an area of 42 hectares, is located in the western part of Germendorf in a former gravel pit. The gravel pit was formed in the middle of the forest when sand was quarried for the construction of the A19 Berlin–Rostock motorway.

The animal park is financed solely by admission charges, donations, and the owners capital, with no municipal money. The park has 22 employees and costs about 500.000 euros a year to run. As of 2006, about 1000 visitors come to see the park during the week, and there can be up to 2500 visitors at the weekend. The park has a number of attractions, such as an open-air theatre, a dinosaur park, 15 barbecue areas, swimming areas and a large playground.

On 6/7 July 2001, there was a big death metal and Black Metal festival at the park, the "Under the Black Sun Festival". Over 2 days, the bands Mütiilation, Judas Iscariot, Deströyer 666, Horna, Murder Rape, Ork and Trimonium played on a purpose-built stage in the western part of the wildlife park. A bootleg recording of the Mütiilation gig exists named "Desecrated Jesus Name - Live in Germendorf, Germany 7/7/01".

There are three hotels or guesthouses in Germendorf: the "Strandhotel" directly adjacent to the park; the hotel "Zum frohlichen Landmann" opposite the village church, and the guesthouse "Pension Markische Heide" on the eastern edge of the village in the direction of Oranienburg.

== Education ==
Germendorf has a primary school which recently joined with the "Eden Grundschule", another local primary school, because both had only a small number of pupils.

Currently, there are about 180 children attending the school in grades 1 to 6, and 10 teachers (male and female). The school offers several study groups ("AG") to the children; for example, a music-group, a maths group and a sports group. The school motto is: "We are a non-violent school, where every student receives the opportunity to acquire a comprehensive base of knowledge."

== Transport ==
Germendorf is situated on the Bundesstraße 273, a federal highway which connects the village with the centre of Oranienburg and with Schwante and Kremmen. It also connects the village to the Bundesstraße 96, which connects directly to the Berlin orbital motorway. The centre of Berlin is 35–40 minutes away by car, the outer reaches of the city just 15 minutes away.

The village is also located on the former railway line Kremmen-Oranienburg-Nauen. This line was closed to public passenger traffic in 1967. Germendorf railway station was built in 1915, when the railway line was built. The track between Germendorf and Oranienburg was largely removed when Bundesstraße 96 was built. Since 2006, it has been possible to use draisines on the track section between Germendorf and Kremmen.

The 824 bus line from Oranienburg railway station to Hennigsdorf railway station has two stops in Germendorf: "Germendorf Dorfstr." and "Germendorf Am Bahndamm". Every 20 minutes, a bus leaves the bus stations on this route.

== Sports ==
Football has a long tradition in Germendorf. A cycling club founded in 1926 established its own football team in 1930. After WWII the team was prohibited. It was not until 1950 that a new team was formed with the name "SG Germendorf". In the 1960s, this football club played under the name "ASG Vorwärts Germendorf" (ASG stands for "Armeesportgemeinschaft" - Army sports community). In 1972, the club was re-established with the name "BSG Einheit Germendorf" and it last changed its name in the 1990s, to "FSV Germendorf 1972". In 2009, the club was playing in the lowest German football league, the Kreisliga Oberhavel.

The club's pitch is the "Germendorfer Sportplatz" near the Germendorfer Grundschule. In 2010, the FSV Germendorf won the Kreisliga Oberhavel, thus qualifying for the Landesklasse West.
