= Kyivan Rus Park =

Public park in Kyiv

Coordinates: 50.1453°N 30.4744°E

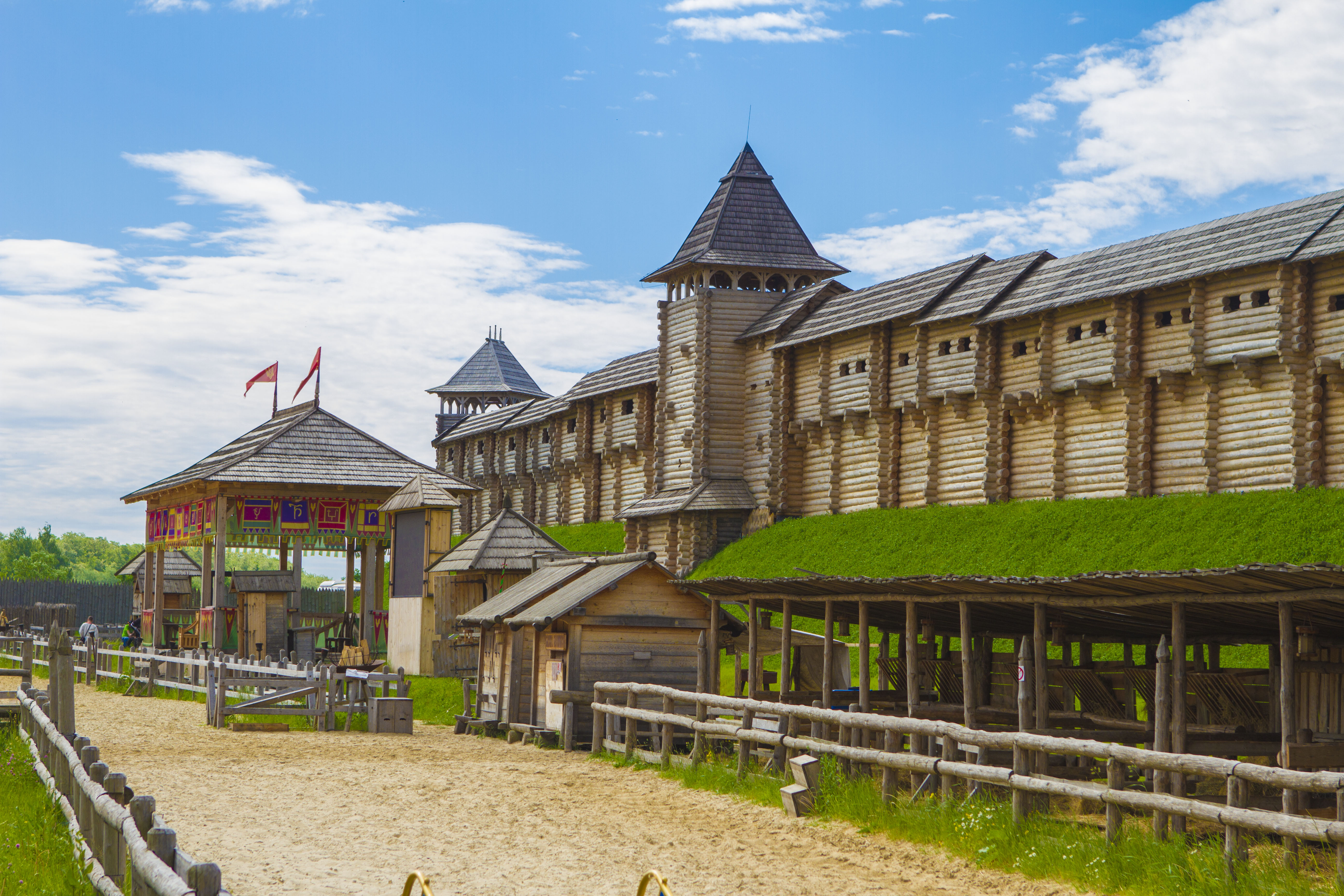
Kyivan Rus' Park

The Kyivan Rus' Park (Ukrainian: Парк Київська Русь; full name Ancient Kyiv in the "Kyivan Rus' Park") is a historical park and cultural center celebrating the Kievan Rus', near Kyiv, Ukraine. The park is a venue for shows, cultural and historical festivals, horse-stunt events, and international championships in ancient martial arts.

The park integrates Rus' culture with that of medieval Europe. In some events staged there it is possible to see both Rus warriors and medieval knights typical of Europe.

== Organization ==
The Slavic Fund charitable organization was founded to create a historical and cultural center about the Kyivan Rus'. The intent was to reconstitute and reconstruct the Kyiv Dytynets (the fortified part of Kyiv in the 5th to 13th century) with a maximum of historical, cultura, and architectural accuracy, as well as recreating the atmosphere of the epoch of Kyivan Rus'.

== Location ==
The park is located in the village of Kopachiv, Obukhiv Raion, 34 km from Kyiv.

== Activities ==
The Park has expositions of siege equipment, historical costumes and armor of the V-XIII centuries, musical instruments, a museum of medieval shipbuilding with a scientifically reliable reconstruction of the boat "Prince Volodymyr" of the IX-XI centuries.
