= Arsenal Park Transilvania =

Theme park in Romania

- Interactive map of Arsenal Park Transilvania
- Location: Codrului street, nr 25, Orăștie, Hunedoara County, Romania
- Coordinates: 45.835303°N 23.163632°E
- Status: Operating
- Opened: June 2008
- Owner: Bega Group
- Operating season: Year round
- Area: 80 hectares (8,611,128 ft^{2})
- Website: www.arsenalpark.ro

Arsenal Park Transilvania is an outdoor theme park in Orăștie, Hunedoara County, and reportedly Romania's largest exclusive retreat. It was opened in June 2009 and is the only military themed park in the country and one of the few in Europe. The theme park is located on an 80 hectares (8,611,128 ft^{2}) plot of land and it involved total investments of US$14 million. The location is the former site of an arsenal factory, Rompiro Orăștie specialised in producing explosives, land mines and ammunition, now a four star resort owned by the Timișoara-based Bega Group. At completion the theme park will total US$26 million of investments.

== Attractions ==
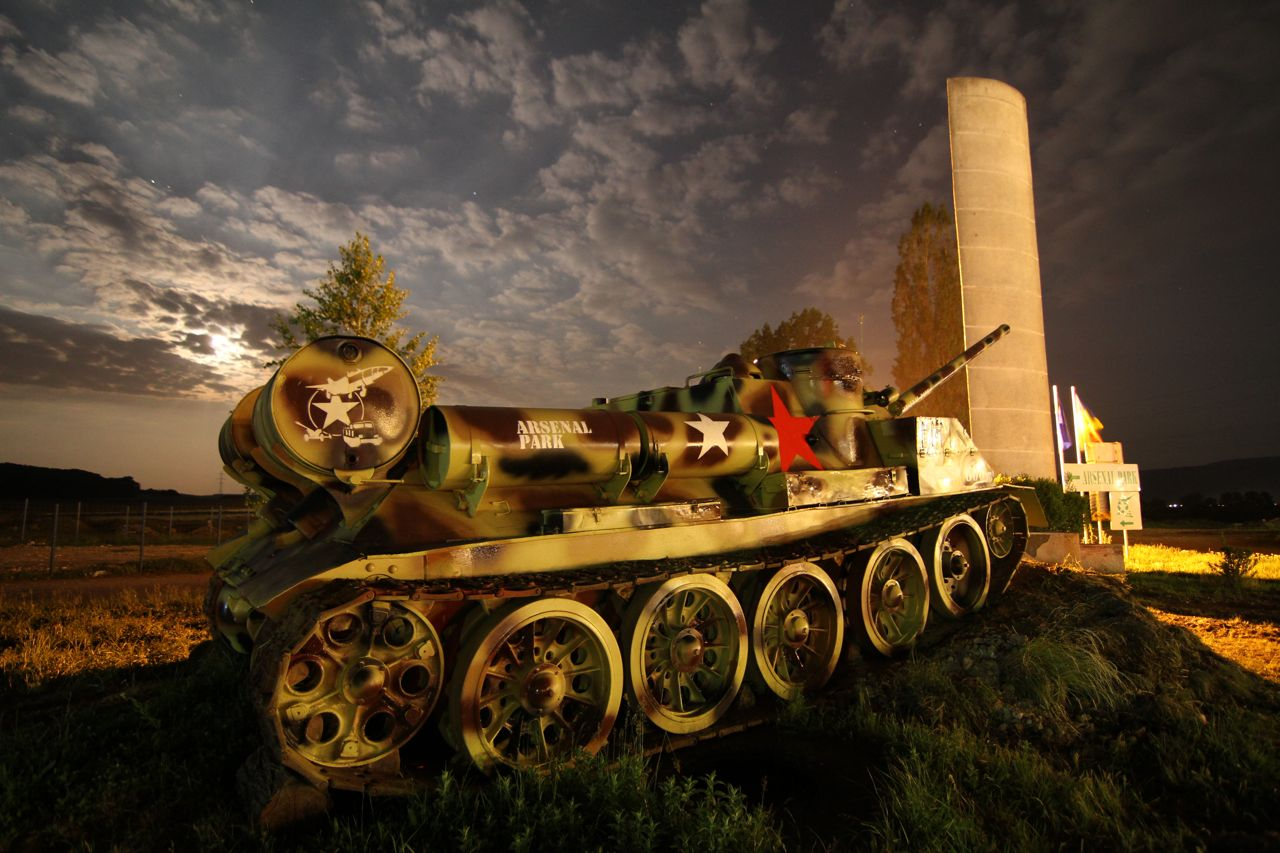
SU 100, as seen by night

The park has a total of 150 accommodation spaces that will eventually rise to 400. The accommodation spaces are divided depending on military rank. The soldiers are bunked in bunkers, tank guns, and TAB shells. The officers have 40 separate rooms located on the main alley. The colonels have separate apartments located in duplex villas named after four famous colonels: Alexandru Ioan Cuza, Claus Schenk Graf von Stauffenberg, T. E. Lawrence, and William P. Sanders. The generals are accommodated in large villas named after three famous generals: Douglas MacArthur, Julius Caesar, and Eremia Grigorescu. The park is developed like an open-air museum with a number of 70 exhibits which include cannons, armoured personnel carriers, rocket launchers, military gun trucks and the most important piece an IAR-93 twin-engine, subsonic, close support, ground attack, and tactical reconnaissance aircraft with secondary capability as low level interceptor.
