= Witches' Water =

Theme park in Tyrol, Austria

Coordinates: 47°28′50″N 12°11′51″E

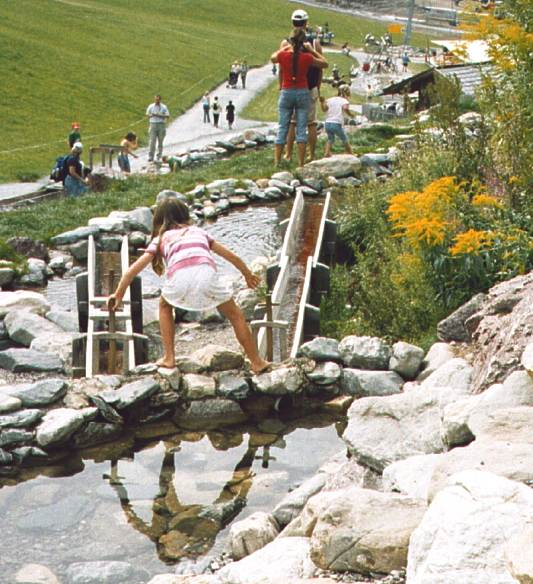
- Sensory experience with water
- Interactive map of Witches' Water
- Location: Söll, Tyrol, Austria

The Witches' Water (German: Hexenwasser) is a theme park at the middle station of the cable car at Söll in Tyrol, Austria. The central part is a water park consisting of ponds and rivulets where children can play a variety of water games. It extends over an area of about 500 meters and is complemented by various alpine restaurants, playgrounds and a petting zoo.

There are some themed trails in the surrounding area, for instance a witches' trail tracing past legends; a panoramic trail in front of the Tyrolese limestone alps; or a mile's barefoot hiking trail featuring opportunities for different kinds of sensory experience. Guests can also visit a dairy, a distillery or experience apiculture. They can also hike to the panorama restaurant at the top of the mountain.

== See also ==
- Barefoot
