= Looping Experiences =

British leisure company

- Formerly: Looping Group (2011–2026)
- Industry: Entertainment
- Founded: 2011; 15 years ago
- Headquarters: Paris, France
- Key people: Laurant Bruloy (Executive Chairman)
- Website: www.looping-experiences.com/en

Looping Experiences is a global entertainment company based in Paris, France, which operates a number of theme park resorts, zoos, water parks and other visitor attractions. It was formerly named Looping Group until July 2026.

== History ==
The group, originally named Looping Group (Groupe Looping in French) was formed in 2011 after the sale of several visitor attractions from Compagnie des Alpes. It currently exclusively operates attractions in Europe, across 8 countries.

The company's portfolio grew with further acquisitions year on year, including Cobac Parc, Isla Mágica (Spain), Planète Sauvage, La Mer de Sable, Fort Fun Abenteuerland (Germany), La Flèche Zoo and Aquapark Amarante between 2012 and 2017. In the UK, the group bought West Midlands Safari Park in 2018, followed by Drayton Manor Resort in 2020. It sold Pleasurewood Hills in 2025, having acquired Waterworld, Stoke the same year. Further recent acquisitions include Aquapark Istralandia and Aquacolors (Croatia), Drievliet (The Netherlands), Terra Botanica and Parc Saint Paul between 2022 and 2025.

== Properties ==
=== Theme parks ===
Name	Location	Year opened	Year acquired
Avonturenpark Hellendoorn	Hellendoorn, Netherlands	1936	2011
Drayton Manor Resort	(United Kingdom) Tamworth, Staffordshire, UK	1949	2020
Familiepark Drievliet	The Hague, Netherlands	1951	2024
Parc Bagatelle	Lille, France	1955	2011
La Mer de Sable	Seville, Spain	1963	2015
Fort Fun	Sauerland, Germany	1972	2017
Cobac Parc	Rennes, France	1975	2012
Parc Saint Paul	Saint-Paul, France	1983	2025
Isla Mágica	Seville, Spain	1997	2013

=== Zoological parks ===
Name	Location	Year opened	Year acquired
Zoo de La Flèche	Le Mans, France	1947	2017
West Midlands Safari Park	(United Kingdom) Birmingham, UK	1973	2018
Planète Sauvage	Nantes, France	1991	2015

=== Water parks ===
Name	Location	Year opened	Year acquired
Waterworld	(United Kingdom) Stoke-on-Trent, UK	1989	2025
Aquapark Amarante	Amarante, Portugal	1994	2017
Aquaparc	Port-Valais, Switzerland	1999	2011
Istralandia	Brtonigla, Croatia	2014	2022
Aquacolors	Poreč, Croatia	2015	2023
