= Formule X =

Amusement ride

- Formule X's first inversion

Familiepark Drievliet
- Location: Familiepark Drievliet
- Coordinates: 52°03′15.79″N 4°20′58.49″E
- Status: Operating
- Opening date: April 6, 2007

General statistics
- Type: Steel – Launched
- Manufacturer: Maurer AG
- Model: XL 1000
- Lift/launch system: LSM Launch
- Height: 50 ft (15 m)
- Length: 1,150 ft (350 m)
- Speed: 45 mph (72 km/h)
- Inversions: 2
- Duration: 27 sec.
- Capacity: 650 riders per hour
- Acceleration: 6 - 45 mph in 2 seconds
- Height restriction: 51 in (130 cm)
- Formule X at RCDB

Formule X is a Maurer Söhne X-Car roller coaster at Familiepark Drievliet amusement park in The Hague, the Netherlands. It opened on April 6, 2007. Formule X was the first X-car coaster to have an LSM launch.

== Technical information ==
The coaster is 50 feet (15 m) tall and 1,150 feet (350 m) long. It contains two never-before-seen inversions and a 135° over-banked turn. There are two trains which can each hold 6 passengers. The LSM launch accelerates from 15 to 70 km/h (6–45 mph) in just 2 seconds. The ride has small dimensions in comparison to other rides: the ride is built on a 50 m × 50 m surface (160 ft × 160 ft). Formule X can handle 650 passengers an hour.

== Ride experience ==
The ride starts with a right turn exiting the station. Immediately, a launch causes acceleration from 6 mph (9.7 km/h) to 45 mph (72 km/h) in 2 seconds, entering an Immelman loop. After this first inversion, the train enters a horseshoe turn, followed by an airtime hill. Next, the train maneuvers through a second inversion, a combination of a half-corkscrew and half of a heartline roll. The train then goes through a 135° overbanked turn, and finally enters the brake run.

== Theming ==
Formule X has little theming. It has some traffic lights counting down for launch, and a few wheels and petrol barrels are spread over the terrain.
