= Planète Sauvage =

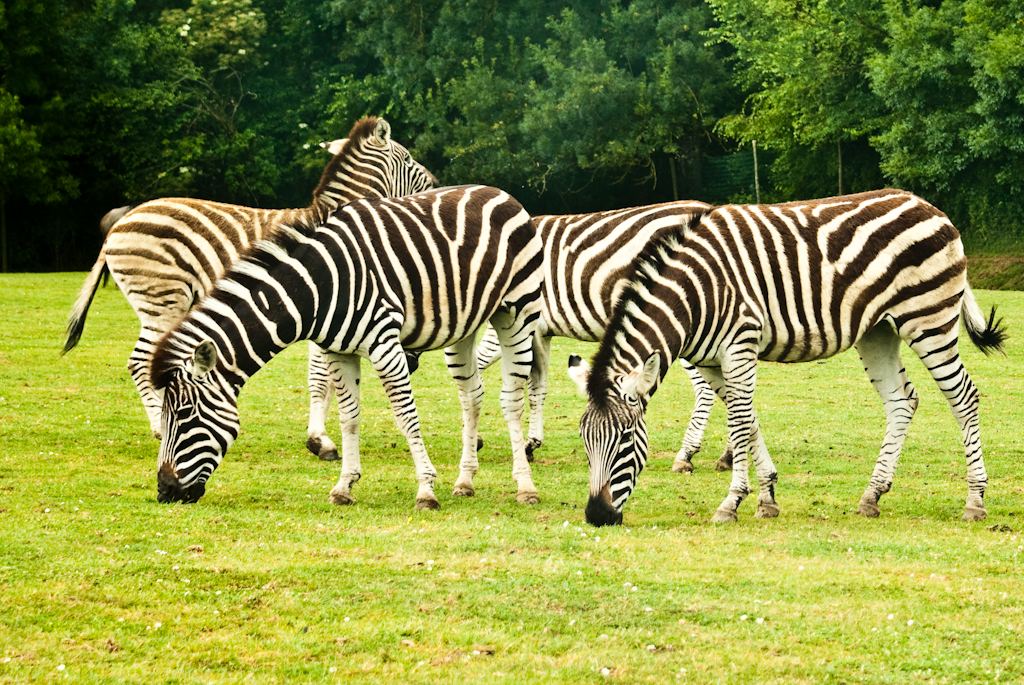
- Zebras at Planète Sauvage
- Interactive map of Planète Sauvage
- 47°07′06″N 1°45′49″W
- Date opened: 1992
- Location: Port-Saint-Père, France
- Land area: 130 ha (320 acres)
- No. of animals: ~1,000
- No. of species: ~150
- Owner: Looping Experiences
- Website: www.planetesauvage.com

Planète Sauvage (French pronunciation: [pla.nɛt so.vaʒ], 'Wild Planet') is a zoological park situated in the French Atlantic coast, in Port-Saint-Père near Nantes, in the Loire-Atlantique departement. Founded in 1992 by Monique and Dany Laurent and known as the Safari Africain until 1998, it was then operated by the Compagnie des Alpes between 2005 and 2015. Since that date the park has been under ownership of Looping Experiences, whose main shareholder is a Belgian private equity fund of the Groupe Bruxelles Lambert. The park's director is Philippe Vignaud.

The park covers about 80 hectares (200 acres) of land, where almost 1,000 animals of about 150 species live, and is a blend of a safari portion visible by car and a pedestrian part which includes one of the three dolphinariums of metropolitan France, where bottlenose dolphins are presented. Since 2008 it receives between 200,000 and 322,000 visitors each year. Although not a member of the EAZA, it cooperates with researchers and finances wildlife conservation NGOs.

It has been at the heart of several controversies since its opening, about a temporary human zoo in 1994, an adjourned dolphinarium project in 1998, the captivity conditions of its dolphins, which three of them have died, since 2007, and the transfer of macaques to a research laboratory practicing vivisection, in 2014.

== History ==
- 1992 : Opening of "Safari Africain". There were 500 animals.
- 1994 : Opening of Bamboula's Village, a human zoo.
- 1998 : The "Safari Africain" is renamed Planète Sauvage with a new sea lions show.
- 2003 : Construction of a 250-metre (820 ft) suspension bridge, 5 metres (16 ft) above the ground, to observe a tribe of 70 macaques: The jungle trail.
- 2005 : Planète Sauvage joins the group Compagnie des Alpes, European leader of the family entertainment.
- 2006 : Creation of the « bivouac au safari ».
- 2008 : Exhibition "Planète Fragile : Fragile beauty from earth"
- 2009 : Opening of "Cité marine" a dolphinarium where five dolphins live.
- 2011: Opening of Bivouac en Mongolie, allowing visitors to stay in yurts inside the park.
- 2013: Three male lions were euthanized due to overpopulation in the group and the inability to transfer them to another zoological facility.
- 2015: The park was sold by Compagnie des Alpes to Looping Group.
- 2016: Two new pedestrian areas opened: Sentier des Incas, dedicated to South American species, and the renovated Temple de la Jungle housing rhesus macaques.
- 2018: Two squirrel monkeys were stolen during a burglary that occurred overnight between March 31 and April 1.
- 2019: Two American black bear cubs were born. The park also opened ten family lodges located near a five-hectare plain occupied by African species.

== The different parts of the park ==
=== The Safari Track ===
With their own car, visitors follow the track near animals for 10 kilometres (6.2 mi). The safari trail is divided into 15 parts where giraffes, lions, wolves, bears, elephants, impalas and much more can be seen. The zoo is currently home to four elephants.

Visitors can also take the "4x4 Off Road Adventure" led by a guide that will get them even closer to the animals.

=== The pedestrian part ===
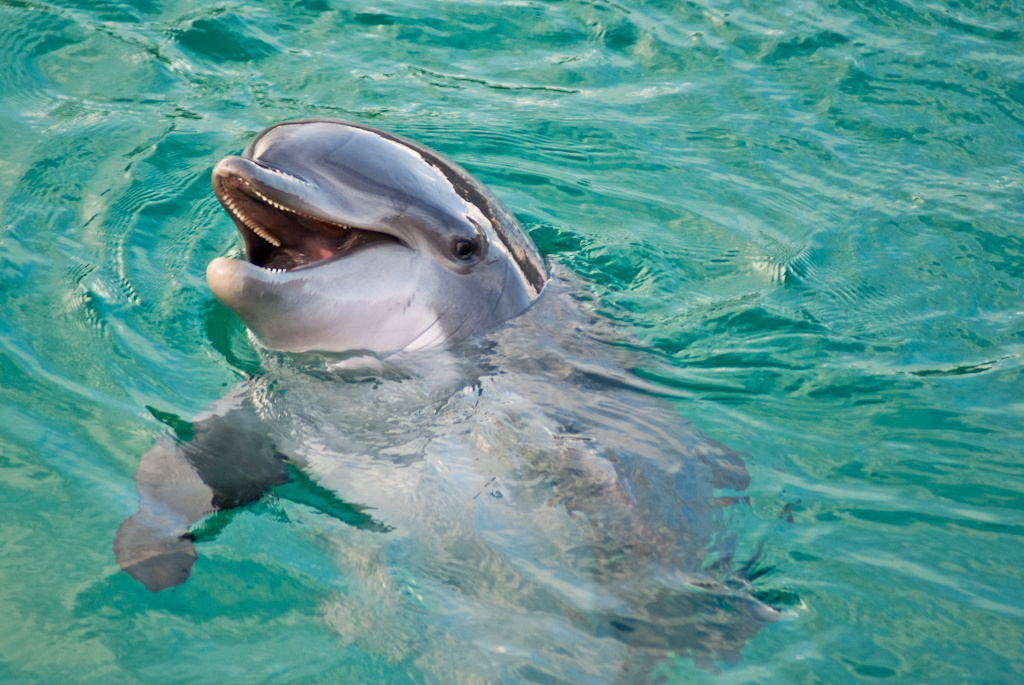
Dolphin at Planète Sauvage

There are different parts:

- The bush village and the ark of reptiles: The adventure continues on foot through the bush village, an authentic reconstruction of a village in Senufo country in Ivory Coast. At the bend of the straw huts there are unusual encounters with small animals such as meerkats, otters and raccoons. The ark that houses reptiles, crocodiles and other "curiosities" lies at the heart of the village.
- The island of flamingos and jungle route: It is in a landscaped area that was a colony of flamingos. Alleys shaded jungle trail leading to the territory of a tribe of monkeys.
- The Marine City: Since November 2008, five dolphins swim at the heart of the four new pools of Marine City. After the welfare of animals, the team has three objectives: to educate, study and protect. In avril 2020, the park have 9 dolphins : Lucy (F), Péos (M), Amtan (F), Ocean (M), Parel (F), Galéo (M), Amani (M), Nouma (M) and Kuma (M).

=== The "Bivouac" ===
The adventure can continue at the bivouac. This service includes a 4x4 off-road trip to attend the return of the animals, dinner at the campfire, a night spent near the animals, and a breakfast.

== Research ==
Planète Sauvage is a park that is involved in different research programs. In partnership with recognized scientists organisations (the CNRS, the University of Rennes ethology), the park is studying communication whistled in the dolphin and the social factors that influence it.

== Controversy ==
In 1994, Planète Sauvage tried to open Bamboula's Village, an "African village" attraction with men and women who, by contract, were to be topless when the weather permitted. Sponsored by Biscuiterie Saint-Michel as part of the promotion for their "Bamboula" cookies, the Cote d'Ivoirian village, rebuilt at Port-Saint-Père, was labeled "Bamboula Village" after the eponymous children's character. Public outcry led to cancellation of the project, as it was judged to come too close to being a "human zoo".
