= Tramway at Villeneuve-sur-Verberie =

Coordinates: 49.3142°N 2.6821°E

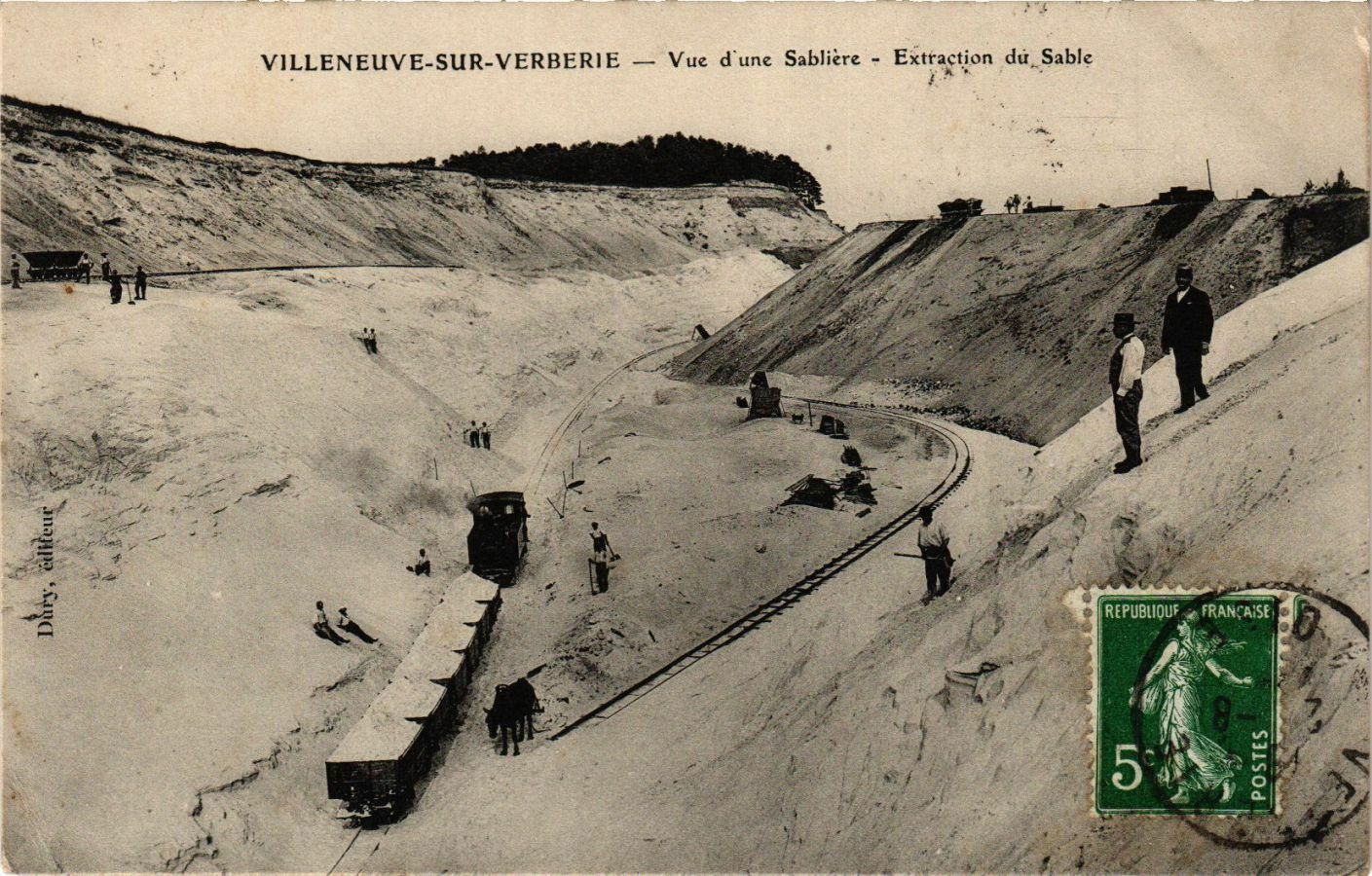
- Tramway in the sand pit Sablière de Villeneuve

Technical
- Line length: 6.5 km (4.0 mi)
- Track gauge: 600 mm (1 ft 11 5/8 in)
Route map
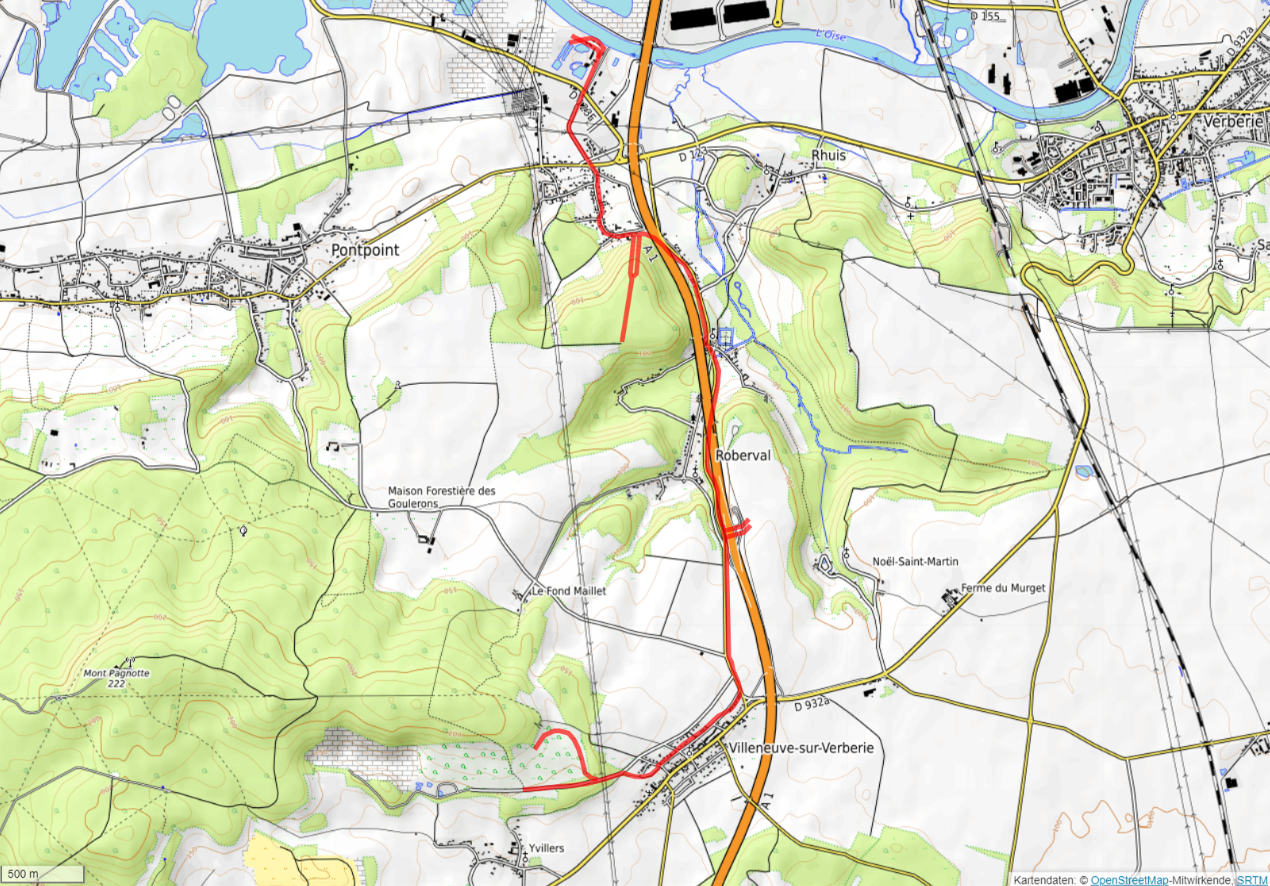
Former route of 1950 superimposed onto a modern map

The Tramway at Villeneuve-sur-Verberie (French La voie ferrée de Villeneuve-sur-Verberie et Roberval à Moru) was a 6.5 km (4.0 mi) long narrow-gauge railway with a gauge of 600 mm (1 ft 11 5/8 in) from the sand pits at Villeneuve-sur-Verberie and Roberval to the port at Moru (Pontpoint) on the Oise in the department Oise in the north of France.

== Route ==
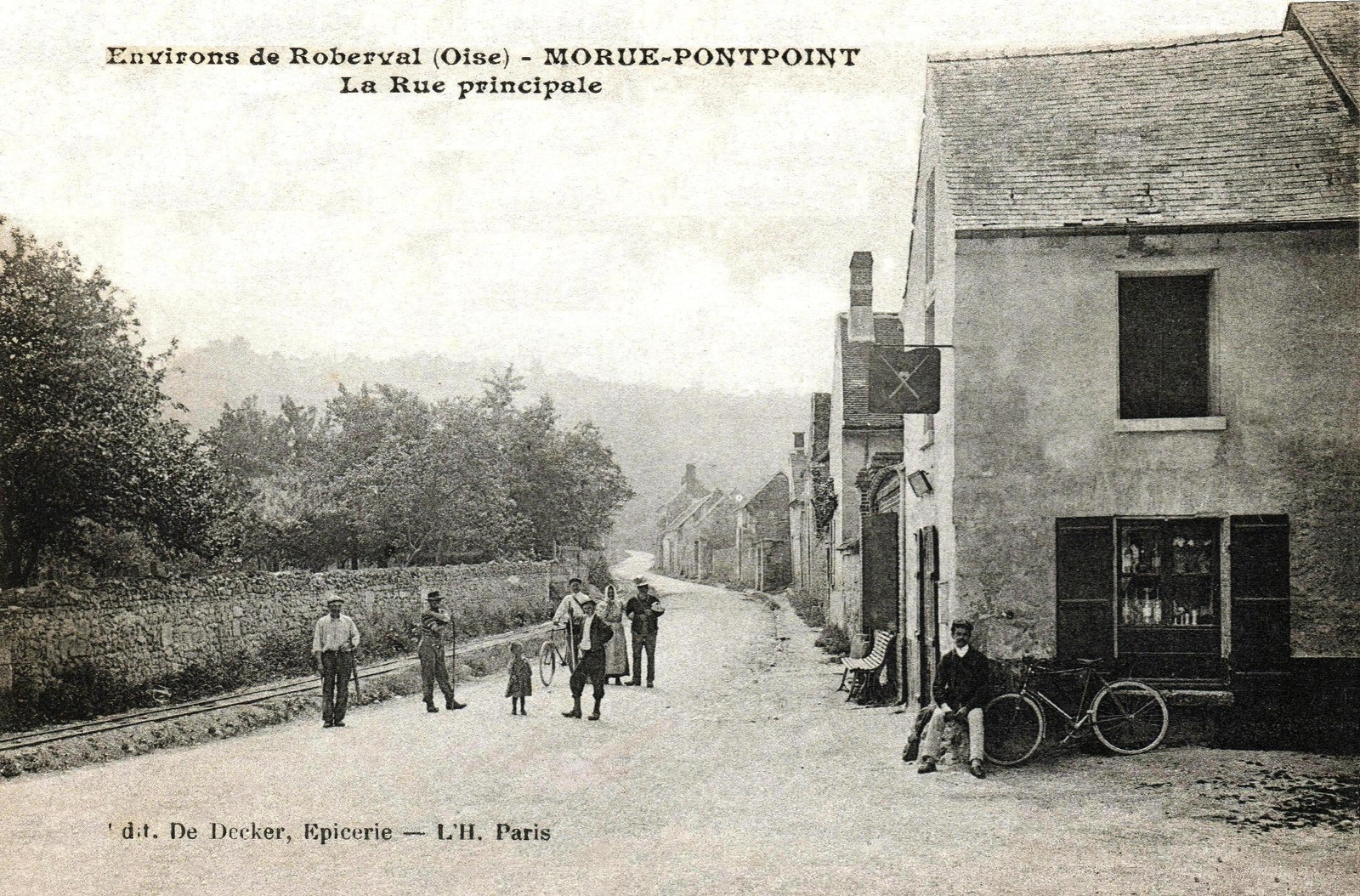
Route in the main street of Moru-Pontpoint

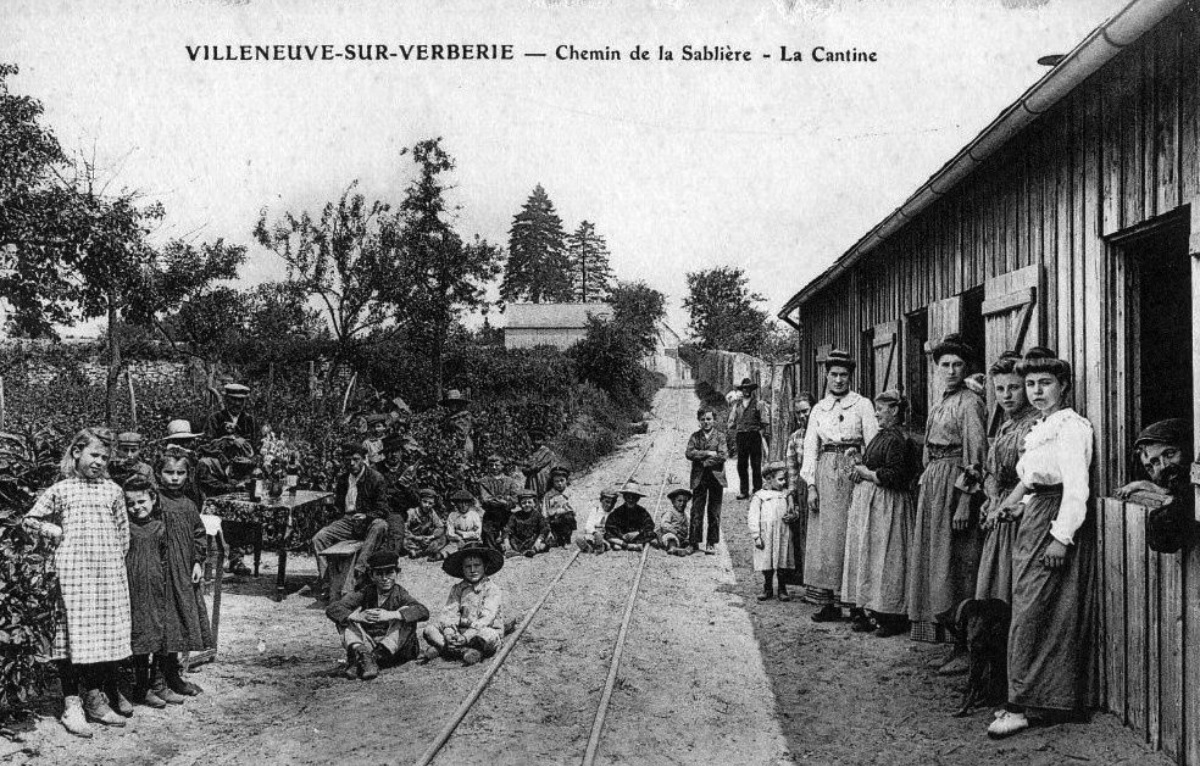
Canteen on the light railway to the sand pit in Villeneuve

The narrow-gauge track started at the Sablière de Villeneuve sand pit, followed a side road through Roberval to the lower station of the funicular railway of the Carrière du Carnage quarry. From there it went through the hamlet of Le Guidon, to the depot at the lower station of the funicular of the Gravière du Plant gravel pit in Roberval and ended at the wharf of Moru on the Oise.

== History ==
The light railway was first laid at the end of the 19th century. The locomotives and carriages were confiscated by the army during World War I and used at the front. The Gravière du Plant gravel pit ceased operations around 1918, but the Carrière du Carnage quarry and the Villeneuve-sur-Verberie sand pit remained in use.

The Société des Sablières de l'Oise, which owned three quarries in the area, had the railway lines re-laid in 1920. The tracks from Fleurines to Pont-Sainte-Maxence were lifted and instead laid between Villeneuve-sur-Verberie and Moru. This enabled more powerful motor locomotives to pull up to 22 carriages weighing 2.5 tonnes each, compared with only 12 carriages for the steam locomotives. Sand production at the Villeneuve sand pit was equivalent to around 420 tonnes per day, which was equivalent to the load of 1½ barges.

When the Northern Motorway (A1) was built, the track had to be dismantled in 1964. The locomotives and wagons were sold to a civil engineering company and the amusement park La Mer de Sable in Ermenonville. The sand pit was served by lorries until it was closed in 1982 and was later used as a rubbish pit.

== Locomotives ==
The following locomotives were used on the line:

- 4 Baldwin
- 1 English steam locomotive
- 1 Popineau
- 3 Gmeinder
- 3 Deutz
- 1 Baldwin-Willeme
- 1 O&K
- 1 Hunslet 2-6-0
