= Karigador =

Karigador Carigador d'Istria
- Village
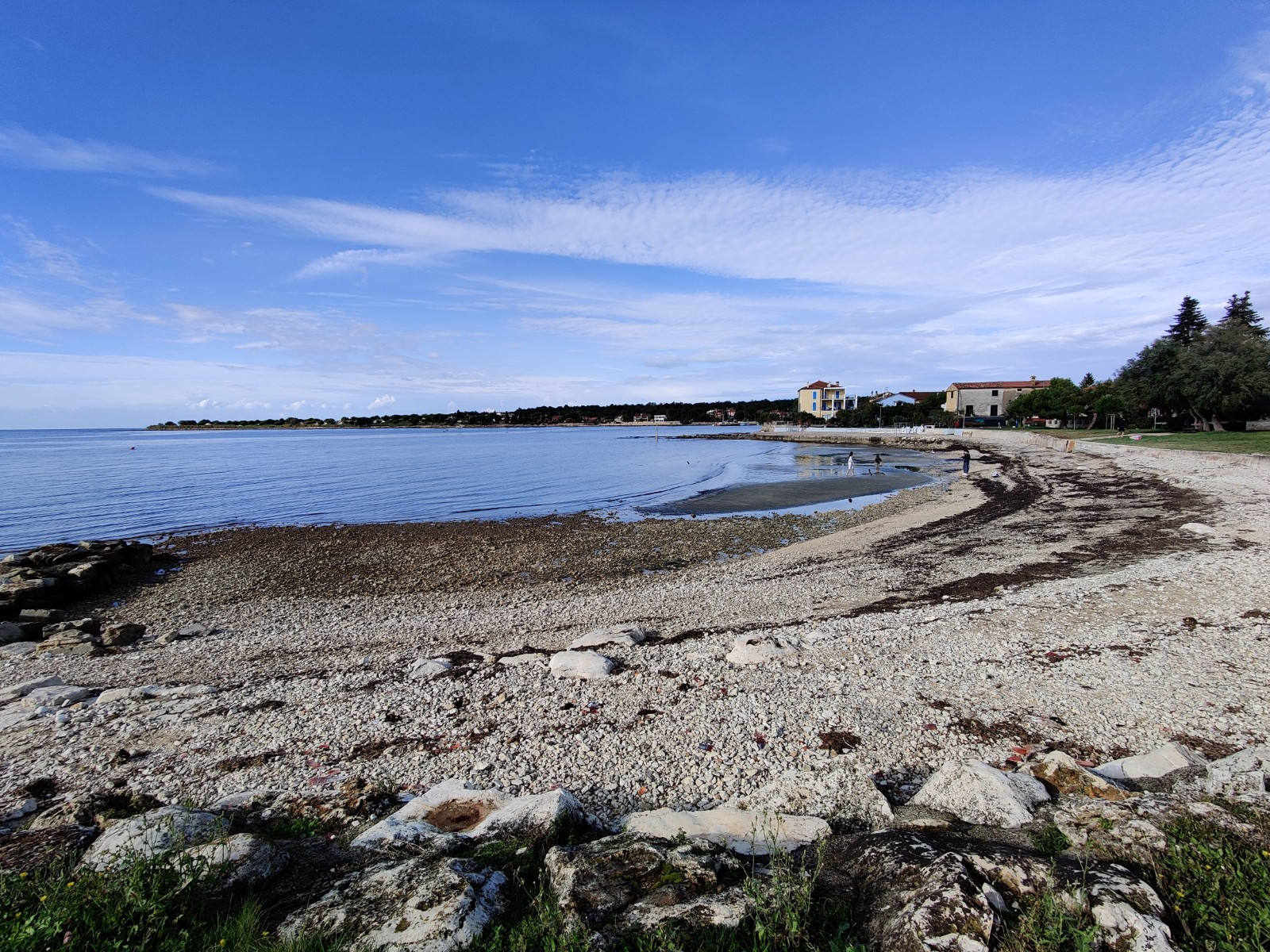
- Beach in Karigador

- Location within Croatia
- Coordinates: 45°21′54″N 13°33′33″E
- Country: Croatia
- County: Istria
- Municipality: Brtonigla

Government
  - predsjednik mjesnog odbora: Olga Sabadin

Area
  - Total: 1.2 sq mi (3.0 km^{2})

Population (2021)
  - Total: 165
  - Density: 140/sq mi (55/km^{2})
- Time zone: UTC+1 (CET)
  - Summer (DST): UTC+2 (CEST)
- Postal code: 52474 Brtonigla
- Area code: 052

Karigador (Italian: Carigador d'Istria) is a village in the Brtonigla municipality in Istria County, Croatia.

== Geography ==
Karigador is situated on the western coast of Istria peninsula, six kilometers north of Novigrad and eight kilometers of Umag. Area of municipality extends from Autocamp Umag in the north to Dajla in south.

== Demographics ==
According to the 2021 census, its population was 165. It was 189 in 2011.
