= Radini =

- Village
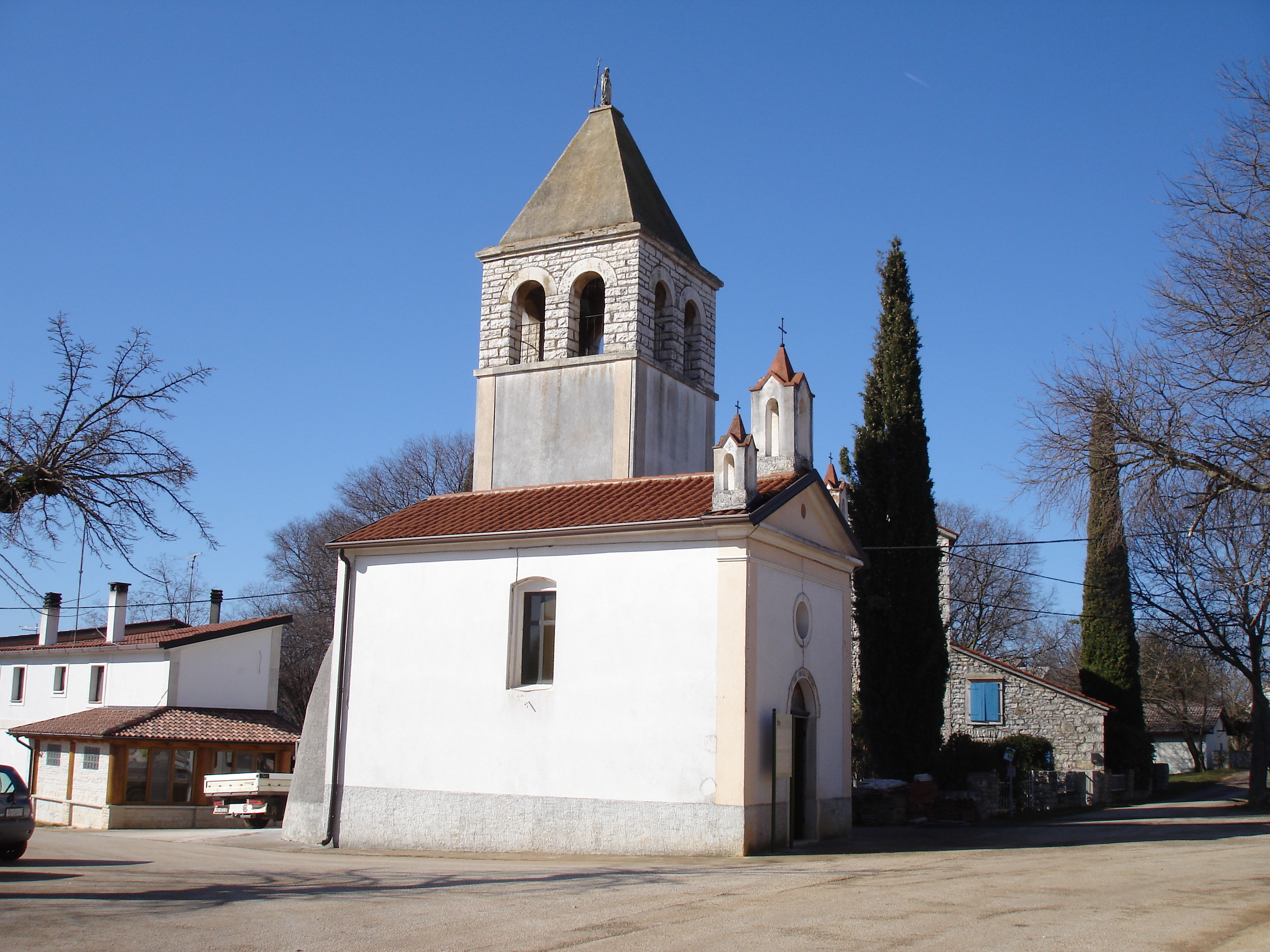
- Church of Our Lady of Lourdes, Radini

- Location within Croatia
- Coordinates: 45°22′41″N 13°34′44″E
- Country: Croatia
- County: Istria
- Municipality: Brtonigla

Area
  - Total: 1.5 sq mi (3.8 km^{2})

Population (2021)
  - Total: 121
  - Density: 82/sq mi (32/km^{2})
- Time zone: UTC+1 (CET)
  - Summer (DST): UTC+2 (CEST)
- Postal code: 52474 Brtonigla
- Area code: 052

Radini is a village in the Brtonigla municipality in Istria County, Croatia.

== Demographics ==
According to the 2021 census, its population was 121. It was 108 in 2011.
