= Fiorini =

- Village
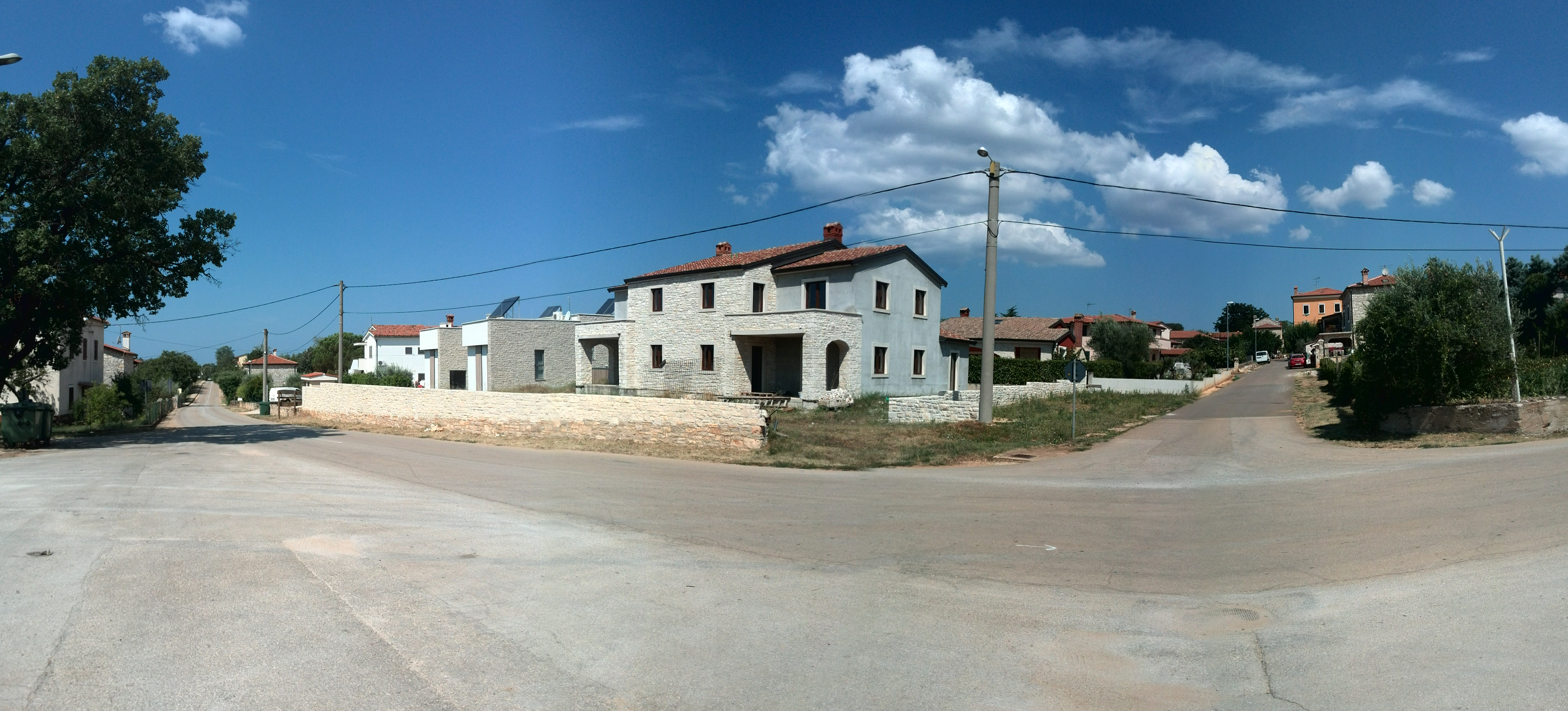

- Location within Croatia
- Coordinates: 45°21′43″N 13°35′06″E
- Country: Croatia
- County: Istria
- Municipality: Brtonigla

Area
  - Total: 0.69 sq mi (1.8 km^{2})

Population (2021)
  - Total: 166
  - Density: 240/sq mi (92/km^{2})
- Time zone: UTC+1 (CET)
  - Summer (DST): UTC+2 (CEST)
- Postal code: 52474 Brtonigla
- Area code: 052

Fiorini is a village in the Brtonigla municipality in Istria County, Croatia.

== Demographics ==
According to the 2021 census, its population was 166. It was 165 in 2011.
