= Brtonigla =

Brtonigla Vertenejo Verteneglio
- Municipality
- Brtonigla Municipality; Općina Brtonigla - Comune di Verteneglio
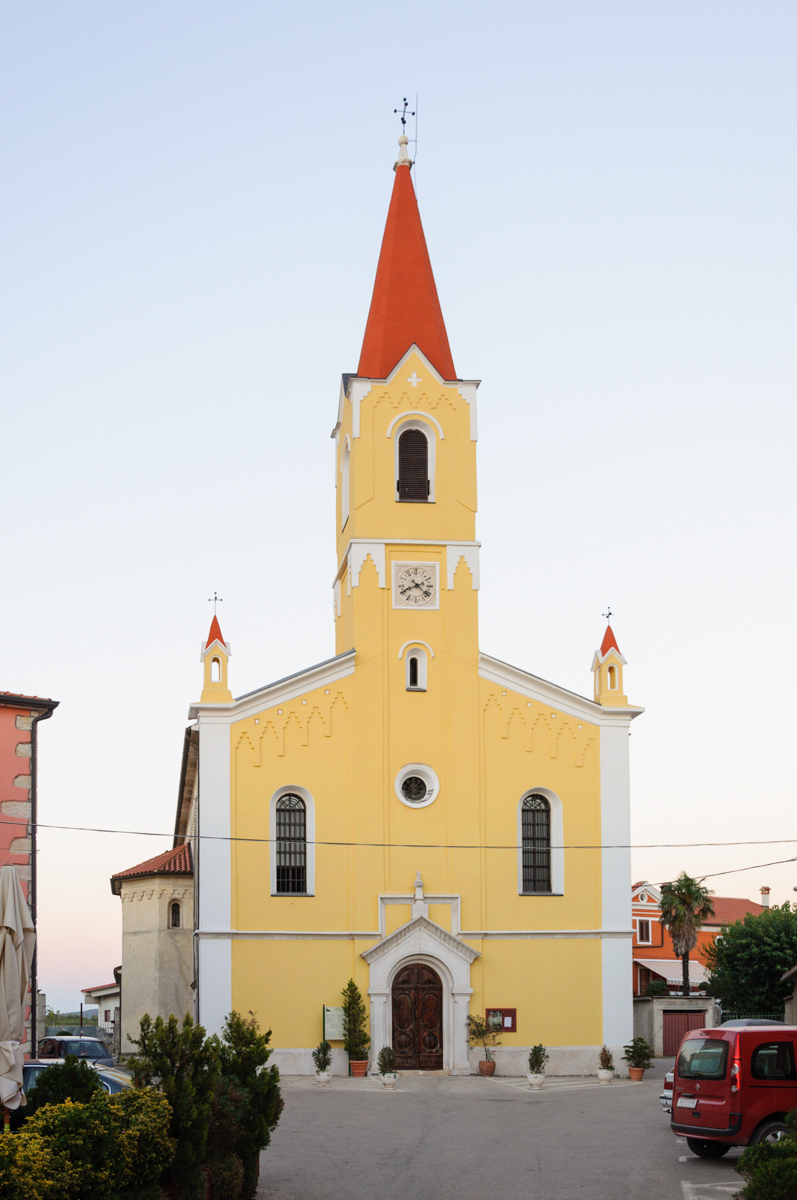
- Church in Brtonigla/Verteneglio/Vertenejo

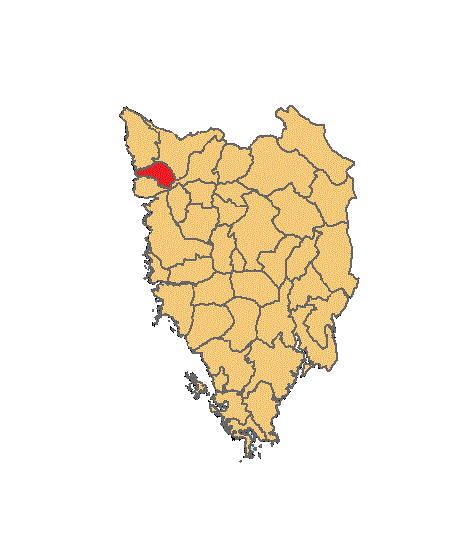
- Location of Brtonigla municipality in Istria
- Interactive map of Brtonigla
- Location within Croatia
- Coordinates: 45°23′N 13°38′E
- Country: Croatia
- County: Istria County

Government
  - Mayor: Neš Sinožić

Area
  - Municipality: 32.9 km^{2} (12.7 sq mi)
  - Urban: 12.6 km^{2} (4.9 sq mi)
- Elevation: 141 m (463 ft)

Population (2021)
  - Municipality: 1,523
  - Density: 46.3/km^{2} (120/sq mi)
  - Urban: 705
  - Urban density: 56.0/km^{2} (145/sq mi)
- Time zone: UTC+1 (CET)
  - Summer (DST): UTC+2 (CEST)
- Postal code: 52466 Novigrad
- Website: brtonigla-verteneglio.hr

Brtonigla ( Italian: Verteneglio; Venetian: Vertenejo) is a village and a municipality in the north-western part of Istria County, Croatia. Brtonigla is officially bilingual, with Croatian and Italian being equal; in 2011, 40% of the population declared themselves as ethnic Italians.

== Physical geography ==
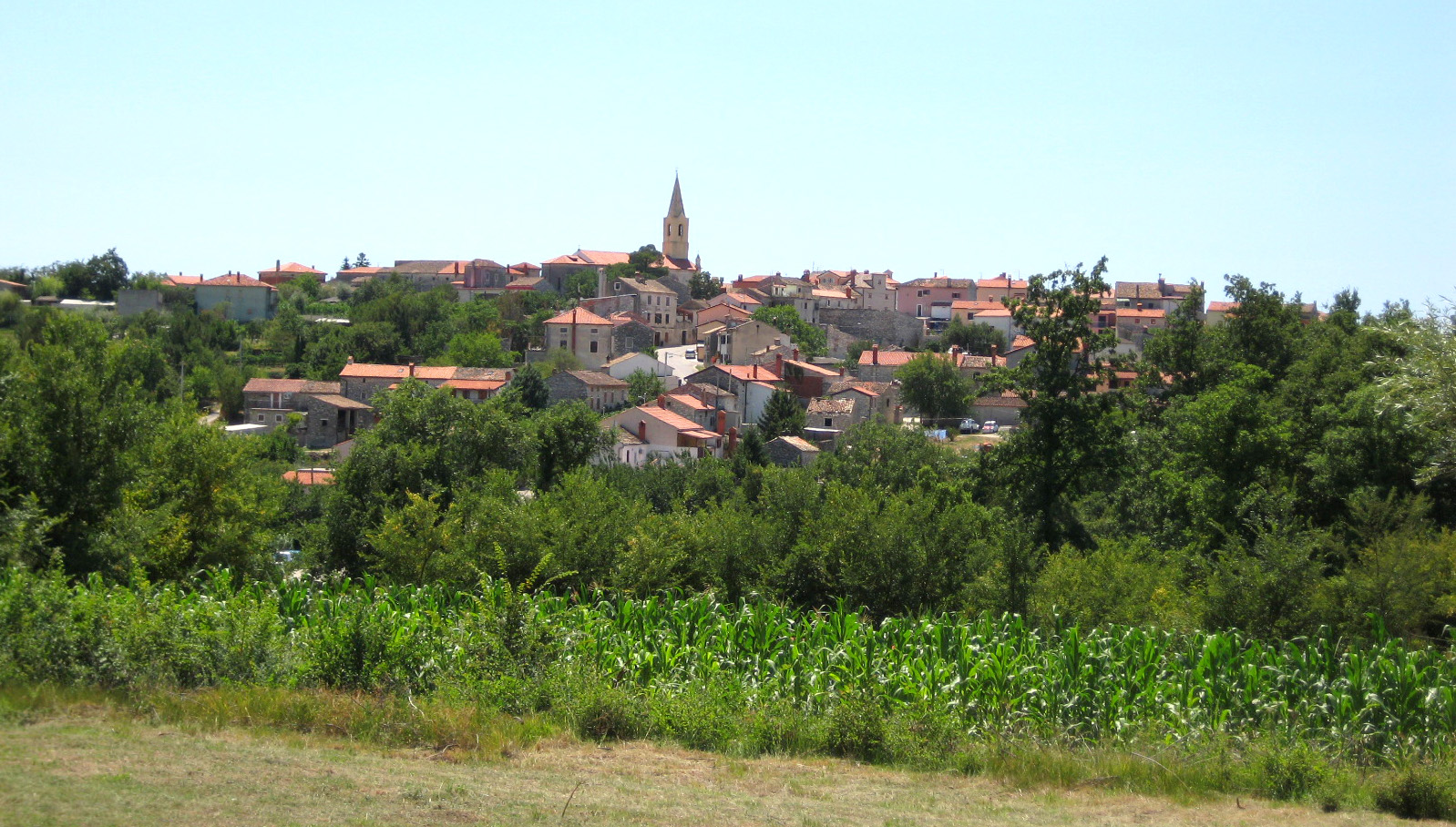
View of Brtonigla

Brtonigla/Verteneglio was formerly part of the municipality of Buje, which is immediately north, and is bordered to the south by the River Quieto. The old town of Brtonigla originally was placed on top of a hill, but over time it extended to its sides, occupying the entire hill. The area is suitable for agriculture. Wine, grain, corn, oil and vegetables are produced there. It is about 3 km (1.9 mi) from Buje, while it is about 4 km (2.5 mi) from the sea. The nearest seaside resort is Karigador. The summers are long and dry, while the winters are mild and pleasing.

== History ==
Brtonigla was mentioned for the first time in 1234, with the ancient name Ortoneglo or Hortus Niger, i.e. black ground garden.

In the 11th century Venetians settled in the area, and in the 16th and 17th century Dalmatian and Balkan peasant families settled there too. Vertenejo was part of the Serenissima Republic of Venice and then of the Austro-Hungarian Empire, with the brief parenthesis of the Napoleonic Kingdom of Italy. After the First World War and then the Treaty of Rapallo, the village became part of Italy, a period in which Verteneglio knew its maximum demographic and economic development. After the Second World War it was included in Zone B of the Free Territory of Trieste. With the cession of Zone B to Yugoslavia, most of the Italian population abandoned the village, by then known as Brtonigla. Since 1991, Brtonigla is a municipality in the Istria County of the Republic of Croatia.

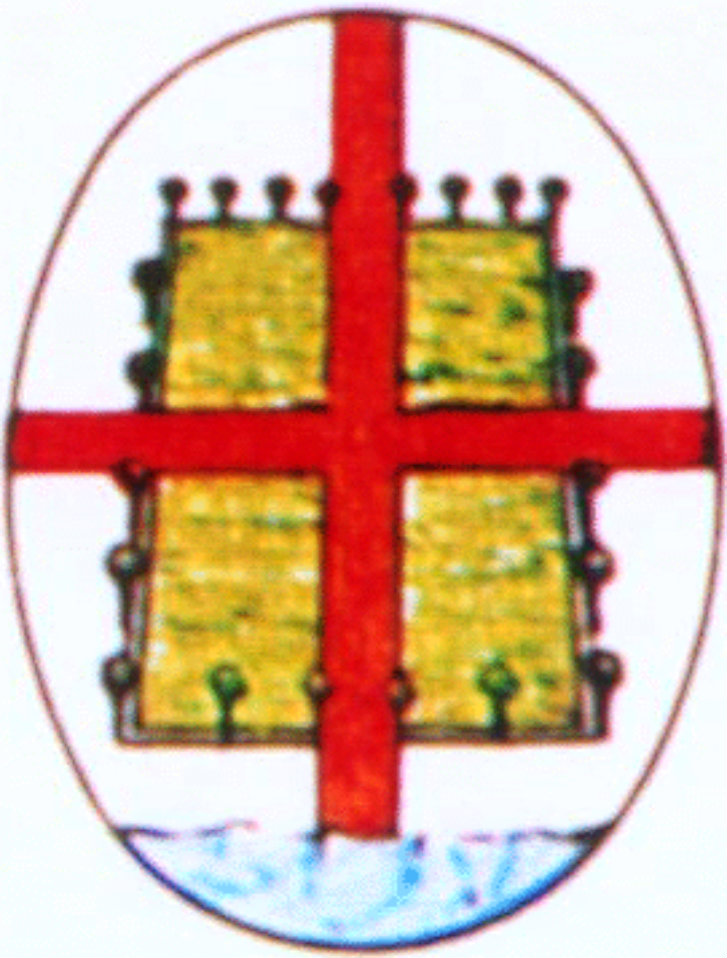
Italian-period coat of arms (1920-1947)

== Coat of arms ==
The municipal symbol became official for the first time during the period of Italian sovereignty (1920-1945). The symbol then consisted of an oval frame enclosing a green field crossed by two dark red streets crossing the center of the coat of arms and the sea (towards the lower part of the coat of arms). The coat of arms that is used since the independence of Croatia perfectly copies the old coat of arms except the sea that has been moved upward. Everything is enclosed in a white frame.

== Monuments ==
- Church of San Zenone: the parish church of Brtonigla is dedicated to San Zenone, Bishop of Verona and patron of the town. The ceiling of the church is flat, the polygonal apse, and the side walls are decorated with marble altars made according to neo-baroque principles. On the yellow, there are two large windows on the sides. Above the entrance is a tall red bell tower, and at the sides of the roof there are two small spiers. The church was built between 1859 and 1861 on the foundations of the oldest homonymous church dating back to 1480.
- Scarlini Natural Park: The Scarlini Natural Park is a reserve that is 2 kilometers (1.2 mi) from Brtonigla. It is named after the small river Scarlini, which flows into the river Quieto. Inside the park the stream lying in a small basin forms a long green pond.

== Society ==
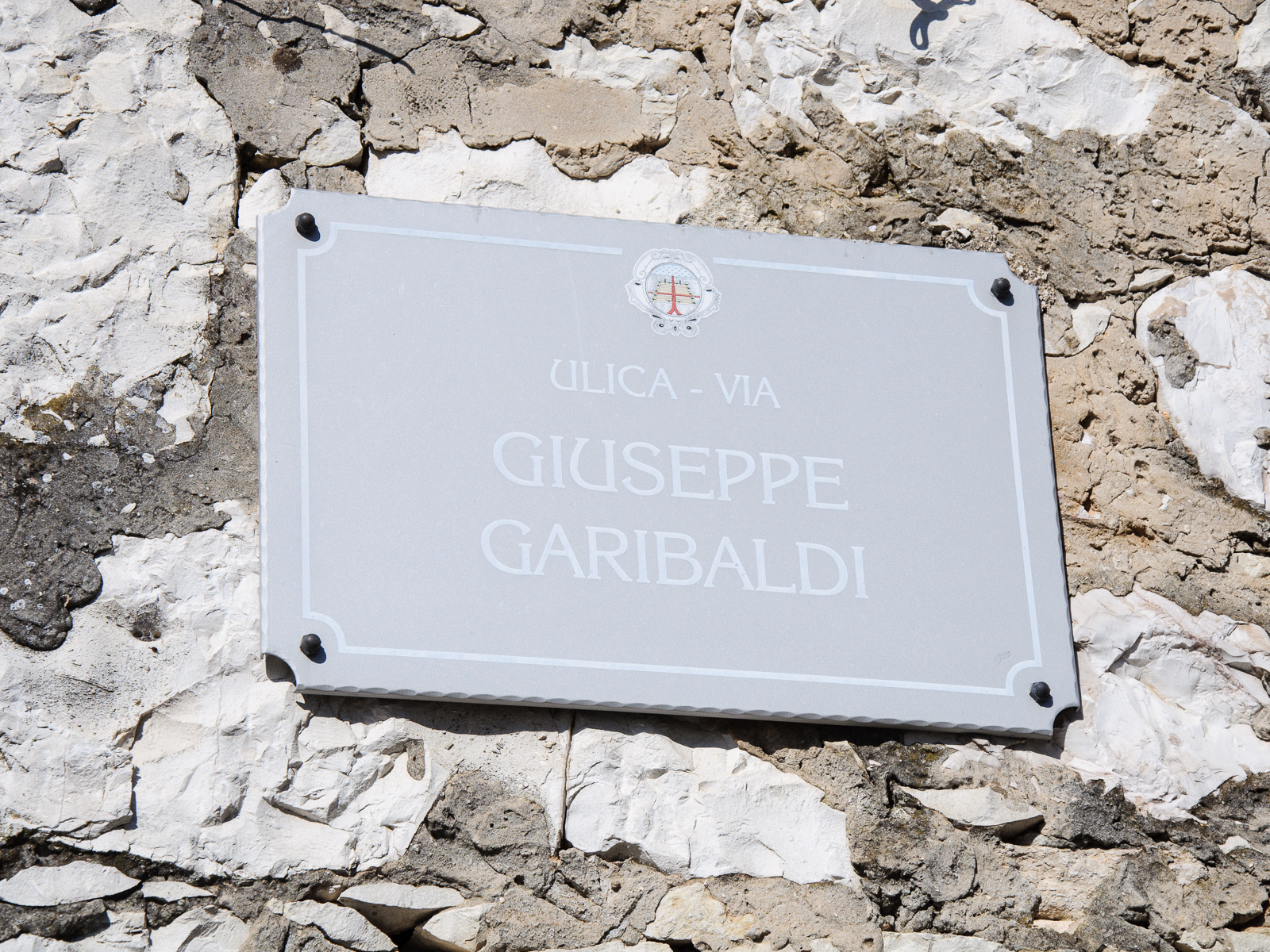
Bilingual signes in Brtonigla (Ulica - Via Giuseppe Garibaldi)

=== Languages and dialects ===
The municipality is bilingual; Brtonigla/Verteneglio is in fact the second Istrian municipality, after Grožnjan/Grisignana, in terms of percentage of Italian-speaking inhabitants. Until before the exodus, the population of Italian ethnicity was between 98 and 100% of the total.

In 2001, Brtonigla/Verteneglio hosted 52.82% Croatian-speakers, 41.29% Italian-speakers, 2.47% Slovenian-speakers and 1.52% Albanian-speakers

In 2011, Brtonigla/Verteneglio hosted 54% Croatian-speakers, 39.79% Italian-speakers, 2.28% Slovenian-speakers and 0.43% Albanian-speakers

Although though the Government of the Republic of Croatia does not guarantee official Croatian-Italian bilinguialism, the statute of Brtonigla itself does.

== Demographics ==
Historical population of the settlement of Brtonigla/Verteneglio
Year	Pop.	±%
1857	1,139	—
1869	1,206	+5.9%
1880	1,072	−11.1%
1890	1,098	+2.4%
1900	1,358	+23.7%
1910	1,550	+14.1%
1921	2,108	+36.0%
1931	2,386	+13.2%
1948	1,537	−35.6%
1953	989	−35.7%
1961	1,107	+11.9%
1971	823	−25.7%
1981	803	−2.4%
1991	736	−8.3%
2001	827	+12.4%
2011	805	−2.7%
Source: Naselja i stanovništvo Republike Hrvatske 1857–2011, DZS, Zagreb

According to the 2021 census, its population was 1,523, with 705 living in the central settlement. The municipality consisted of the following settlements:

- Brtonigla, population 705
- Fiorini, population 166
- Karigador, population 165
- Nova Vas, population 366
- Radini, population 121
Brtonigla: Population trends 1857–2021
v

population	1492	1586	1819	2014	2274	2651	2825	3172	2892	1869	1958	1523	1446	1398	1579	1626	1523
	1857	1869	1880	1890	1900	1910	1921	1931	1948	1953	1961	1971	1981	1991	2001	2011	2021

Sources: Croatian Bureau of Statistics publications

=== Religions ===
Religions in Brtonigla
Catholics	85%
Atheists	4%
Muslims	3%
Agnostics	4%
Orthodox	2%

== Settlements ==
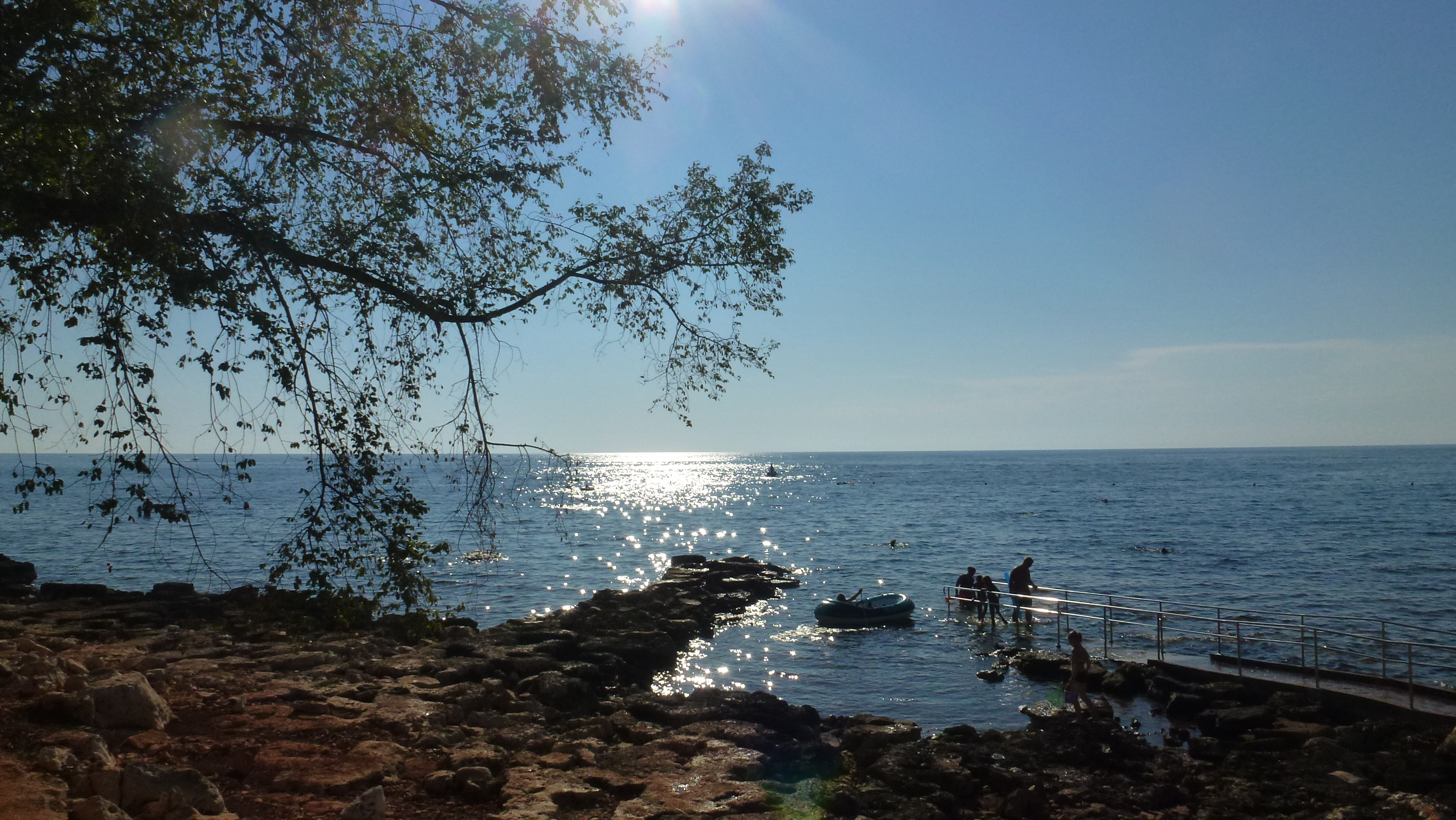
Karigador (Carigador)

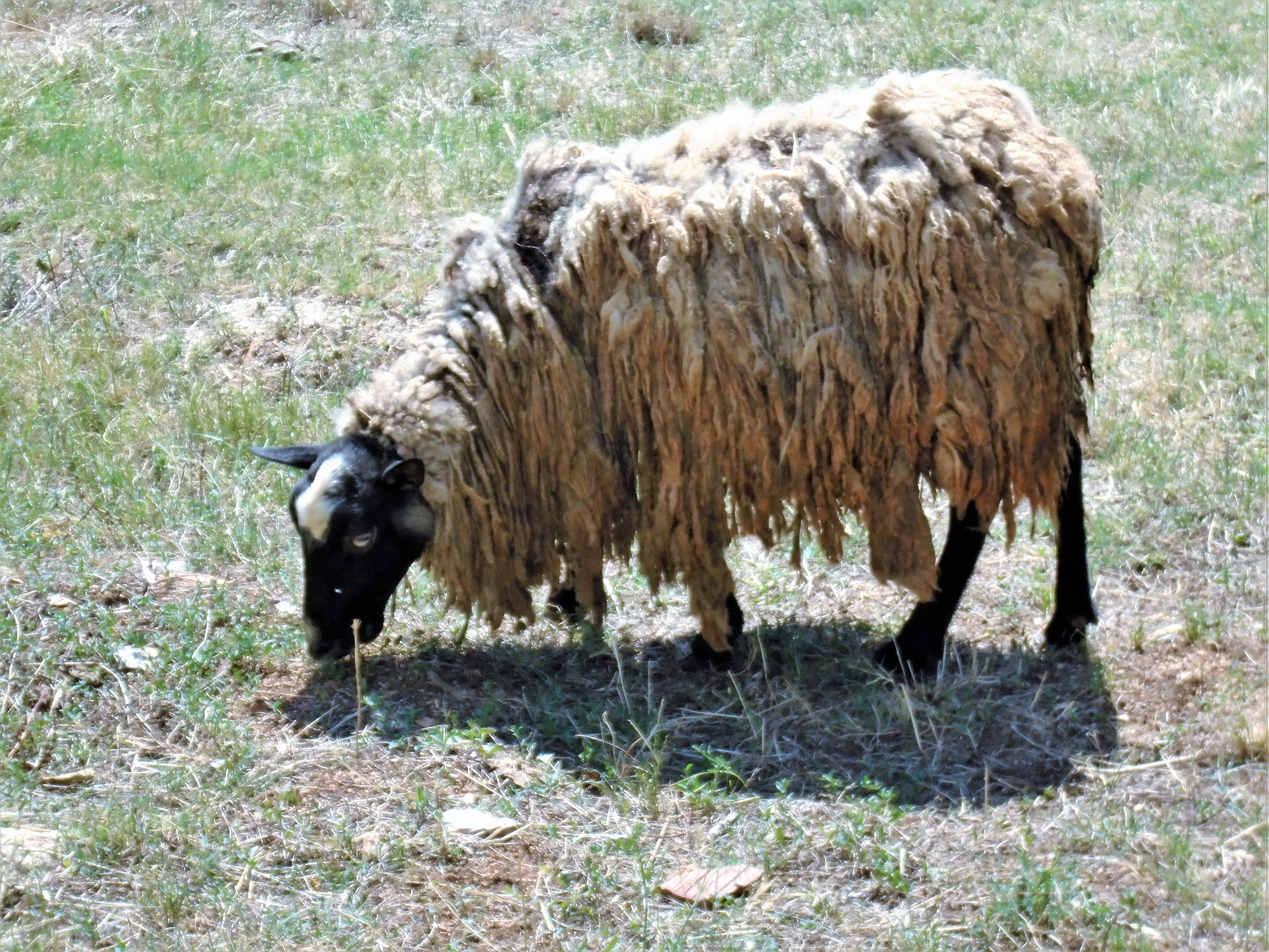
Istrian sheep grazing near Brtonigla

The municipality includes several settlements:

- Brtonigla - Verteneglio, population 805
- Fiorini, population 165
- Karigador - Carigador, population 189
- Nova Vas - Villanova del Quieto, population 359
- Radini, population 108

== Notable residents ==
- Giovanni Craglietto (1889 Verteneglio - 1975 Trieste), painter and drawer

== Twin towns ==
Brtonigla/Verteneglio is twinned with:

- Greve in Chianti, Italy

== See also ==
- Istralandia
- Karigador
