= Isla Mágica =

Theme park in Seville, Spain

- Previously known as Cartuja, El parque de los descubrimientos
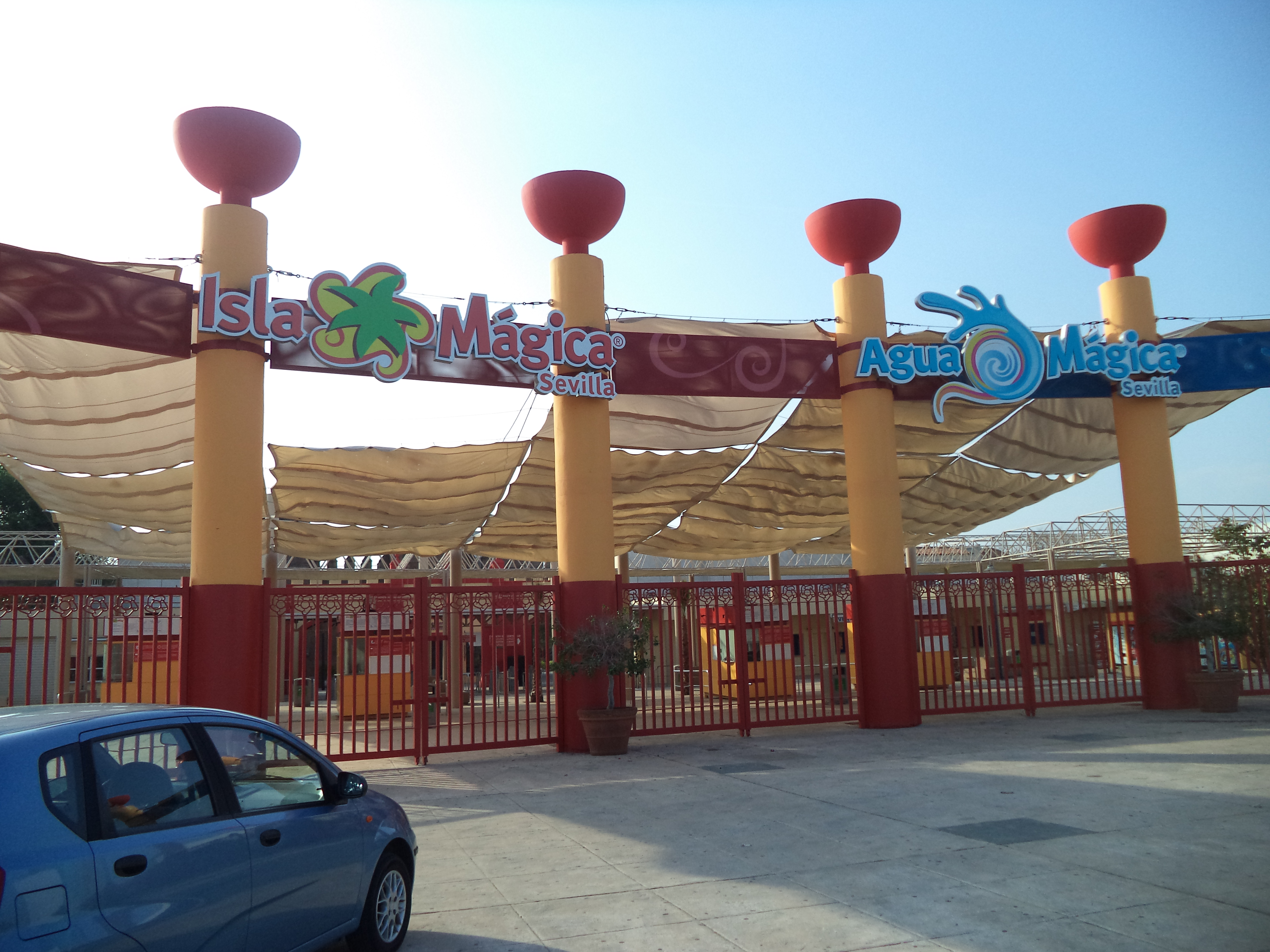
- Main entrance
- Interactive map of Isla Mágica
- Location: Seville, Andalusia, Spain
- Coordinates: 37°24′30″N 6°00′01″W
- Status: Operating
- Opened: 28 June 1997
- Owner: Looping Experiences
- Operated by: Pedrito
- Slogan: Diversión sin límites (Fun without Limits)
- Attendance: 800.000 personas
- Area: 36 hectares (89 acres)
- Website: Official website

Isla Mágica (Spanish pronunciation: [ˈisla ˈmaxika], Magic Island) is a theme park at the Isla de La Cartuja, in Seville, Andalusia in Spain. The park has six themed areas and a water park called Agua Mágica.

The theme was built after the Expo '92 Universal Exhibition on part of the grounds where it was held. Initially called Cartuja, El parque de los descubrimientos, the theme park was later redesigned and it reopened as Isla Mágica on 28 June 1997. On 28 June 2014, the Agua Mágica water park was opened.

It features a large lake and many other attractions including roller coasters and various other types of rides as well as both live and cinematic shows. The park's slogan is "Diversión sin límites" which translates as "Fun without Limits".

== Main rides ==
- Jaguar - The first inverted rollercoaster in Spain, with five inversions (2x heartline roll, 1x immelman and 2x in-line twist) and a final helix, and one of the most popular roller coasters in the park. It's an SLC+ (the second in the world and the first in Europe), a special edition with a helix before the brakes, by the Dutch manufacturer Vekoma.
- Dimensión 4 - A 4D cinema, which shows films including "Haunted House", "SOS Earth" and "Fly me to the Moon"; by KraftWerk, 3DBA and Nwave.
- Anaconda - A log flume ride, with three drops (8.1, 9.0 and 17.6 metres), by the German manufacturer Mack Rides.
- Iguazú - A splash ride with a drop of 15 metres and more than 50 km/h; by manufacturer Intamin AG.
- Rápidos del Orinoco - A river rapids ride with 500 metres length; by Intamin AG.
- El Desafío - An a tended Power drop tower, themed around Seville, with an Islamic-style minaret in the station; by German manufacturer Maurer AG.
