= Bamboula's Village =

Human zoo in France

Coordinates: 47.118329°N 1.763492°W

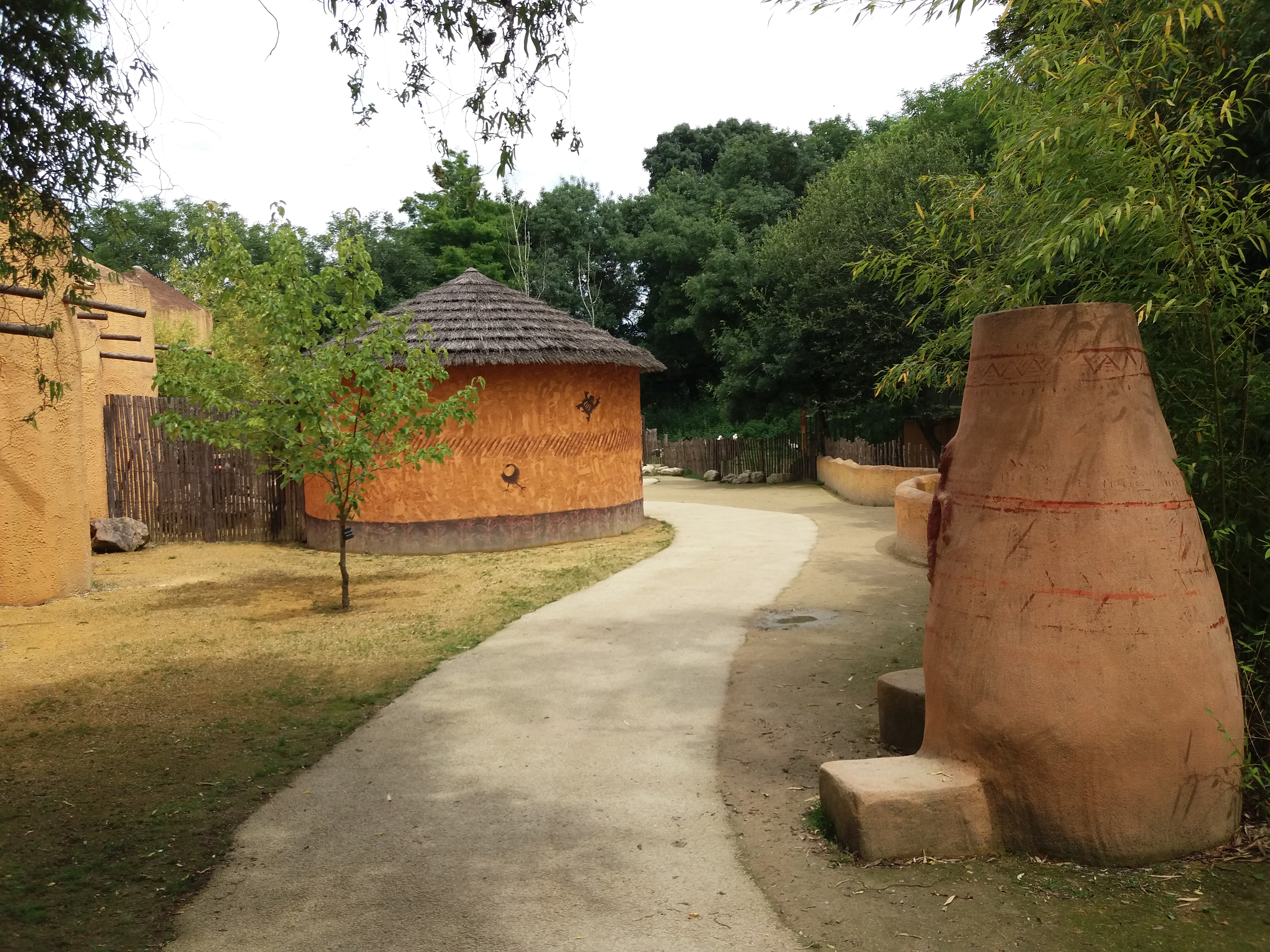
The village of Kirikou on le chemin de brousse, Planète Sauvage

Bamboula's Village (French: Village de Bamboula) was an attempt to recreate an Ivory Coast village within the Planète Sauvage zoo (then known as Safari Africain) in Port-Saint-Père, near Nantes, in France. It is considered the last human zoo in France.

Opened in 1994, the village was created with the aim of promoting tourism in Ivory Coast, in partnership with the biscuit brand Biscuiterie Saint-Michel. It was named "Bamboula's Village" after the company's "Bamboula" chocolate biscuits, which had a black person with the same name as their mascot. The name of the biscuits was a racial slur, dating from colonial times. The village was constructed in the winter of 1993.

== Working conditions ==
Twenty-five Ivorians, including children, were hired for six months to build and inhabit the village. They performed every day of the week, and received pay below the French minimum wage. Dancers were forced to work bare-chested despite bad weather. Performers' passports were confiscated; most lived confined to their huts (the park gate being closed in the evenings), which provided less space than required by labour law. Children were kept out of school, while medical care was provided by the zoo's veterinarians.

According to their contract, the inhabitants of the village were under the authority of the Ivorian Tourism Office, and therefore of Ivorian legislation, a fact that did not appear to pose an issue for local politicians. As Ivorian law was applied, their salaries were paid in CFA francs: between 50,000 and 120,000 for the artists (76-182 euros) and 300,000 for the artisans (475 euros). Not long after the village was inaugurated, the deputy director of the Direction départementale du travail (local employment organisation) admitted to having signed a collective work permit. As the request came from Dany Laurent and not from the Ivorian Ministry of Tourism, French legislation should be applicable.

The workers also lacked work visas and social security, and would be repatriated to Ivory Coast in case of sickness, according to the director of the wildlife park. No schooling was put in place for the five children, who would be looked after by the troupe elder. Two were girls aged 12 and one boy was aged 10. According to the Fédération syndicale unitaire, no work permits had been issued to the minors, as the judge responsible for this had not been informed that they would be coming. Lastly, due to fears of potential illegal immigration, the park's management decided to keep the Ivorian workers' passports in a safe to prevent them from leaving.

== Opposition ==
Anti-racist organisations and unions formed the group "Non à la réserve humaine" ["No to the Human Zoo"] and began legal action against the park. By the time that the court had sent an expert to document human-rights violations, the performers had been ordered out of the country. The village was closed in September 1994. The park had to pay a symbolic one French franc in damages, plus legal fees.

== Aftermath ==
Bamboula's Village was demolished, and the Bamboula chocolate biscuit was no longer sold.
