= Parc Bagatelle =

French amusement park

- Interactive map of Parc Bagatelle
- Location: France
- Coordinates: 50°25′48″N 1°36′10″E
- Opened: 1955
- Owner: Looping Experiences
- Attendance: 285,000 (2016)
- Area: 26 hectares (64 acres)

Attractions
- Total: 40
- Roller coasters: 5
- Water rides: 6
- Website: www.parcbagatelle.com

Parc Bagatelle is a seasonal amusement park in Rang-du-Fliers, France. Founded in 1955, it is the oldest amusement park in France.

== History ==
Opened in 1955 by Henri Parent, Parc Bagatelle is the oldest operating amusement park in France. It was taken over by the Parents' son, François, in 1971. The park was sold to the Looping Group by Compagnie des Alpes (known as Grévin & Co until 2002) in 2011. The park is currently directed by François-Jerome Parent, grandson of Henri Parent.

== Attractions ==
=== Roller coasters ===
Parc Bagatelle is home to five roller coasters.

Coaster	Picture	Opened	Manufacturer	Description
Famous Jack		2006	Reverchon Industries	A spinning Wild Mouse roller coaster initially located at Pleasurewood Hills as Mouse Trap before relocating to Bagatelle. Until 2014 it was called Ragondingue.
Gaz'Express		1987	Soquet	
Kid'z Coaster		2015	SBF Visa Group	
Spirale Express		1996	Soquet	
Triops		2012	Vekoma	An inverted shuttle roller coaster that originated at Liseberg as HangOver – the first of Vekoma's Invertigo roller coasters

=== Water rides ===
Ride	Picture	Opened	Manufacturer	Description
Aqua'Bag		2013	J&J Amusements	Bumper boats
Flamingos		1967	Adventureglass	Flamingo themed pedalos
Raft		2001	Hafema	A river rapids ride
Rapid'O'Bag		1991	Van Egdom	Three identical water slides
River Splatch		1976	Reverchon Industries	A log flume formerly known as Ch'Plouf (2006-2011)
Splash Factory		2000	L&T Systems	A log flume formerly known as La Rivière Canadienne, then Les Flobarts

=== Thrill rides ===
Ride	Picture	Opened	Manufacturer	Description
Bag Pearl		1993	S.D.C.	A pirate ship formerly known as Captain Bag
Silver Wings		2017	Zamperla	
Twist'Air		2015	Lamborghini Rides	A chair swing

=== Former attractions ===
==== Former roller coasters ====
Coaster	Opened	Closed	Manufacturer	Description
Coleoz'Arbres	1994	2007	Schwarzkopf	A Jet Star model roller coaster
unknown	1969	1975	Pinfari	A Zyklon Z47 Galaxy
unknown	≤ 1987	≥ 1987	Soquet	A roller coaster identical to Bocasse Express at Parc du Bocasse
