= La Mer de Sable =

French amusement park

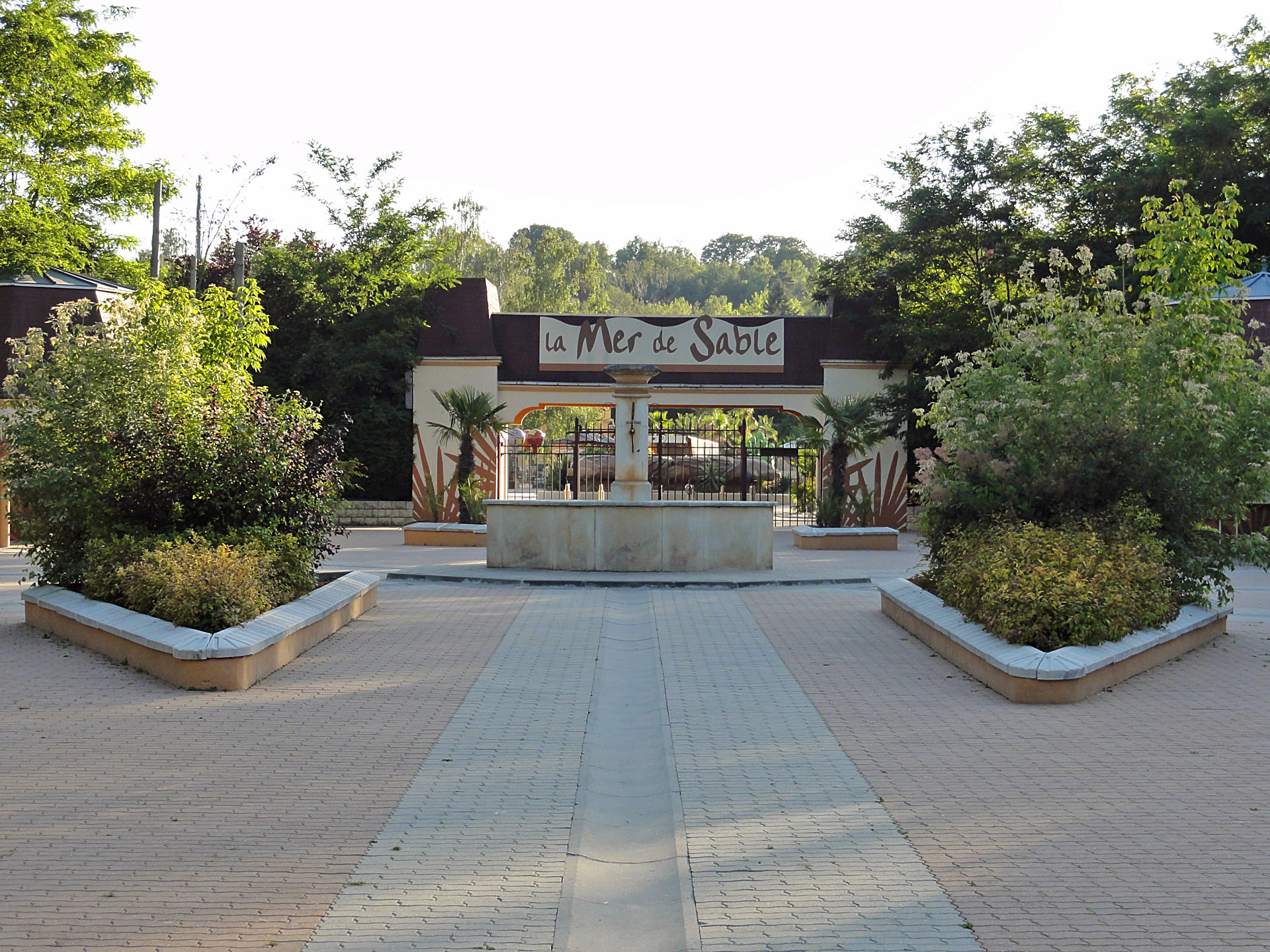
- Entrance to the park
- Interactive map of La Mer de Sable
- Location: Ermenonville Forest, Oise, France
- Coordinates: 49.14538889°N 2.67635°E
- Opened: 1963
- Operated by: Looping Experiences
- Attendance: 358,538 (2018)
- Area: 55 ha (140 acres)
- Website: Official Website

La Mer de Sable is an amusement park founded in 1963 and is located in Ermenonville Forest. The park is close to the commune of Ermenonville in the Oise department of northern France. The park is owned and operated by Looping Experiences.

== History ==
The park was founded by the French actor Jean Richard in 1963 on lands leased by from the Institut de France. The park was bought by Compagnie des Alpes in July 2005, who at the time owned Parc Astérix, another amusement park only 5 km away. The park was then sold to its current owner, Looping Experiences, in 2015.
