= Biscuiterie Saint-Michel =

French food company

- Type: Public
- Industry: food
- Founded: 1905, in Saint-Michel-Chef-Chef
- Founder: Joseph Grellier
- Headquarters: Contres, France
- Products: food
- Number of employees: 1200
- Website: www.stmichel.fr

Biscuiterie Saint-Michel is a French food company, a subsidiary of St Michel Biscuits, which produces and markets dry biscuits under the St-Michel brand name. It was founded in 1905 in the coastal town of Saint-Michel-Chef-Chef, where is still standing the original factory. However, the headquarters have been relocated in Contres.

Saint-Michel produces a range of biscuits, exports them to about 30 countries, and offers store brand production services. The "Galette St Michel" biscuit, which has been produced since 1905, features the surname of the founder (Grellier).

== History ==
At the beginning of the 20th century, a pastry chef named Joseph Grellier was making small golden biscuits in the village of Saint-Michel-Chef-Chef, to which he gave his name. The bakery opened in 1905, and Joseph Grellier, looking for a cookie that would keep for a long time, created Galettes Saint-Michel. His wife, Constance, decided to sell these cookies to the wealthy ladies of Paris who came to the sea baths at Tharon-Plage, a seaside resort belonging to the commune of Saint-Michel. The Saint-Michel brand was created that year.

In 1912, Joseph Grellier had a production workshop built opposite the bakery, in response to the growing success of his galette. This building is still the cookie factory's store today.

The cookies were industrially processed from 1919 onwards by their nephew, Félix Grellier, who founded Société Biscuits Saint-Michel. Production diversified with regional shortbread, Éventails d'or and Roudor Breton palets.

The cookie factory remained in the Grellier family until 1994, when it was acquired by the German group Bahlsen. It then became a Bahlsen subsidiary under the Bahlsen Saint-Michel brand.

In 2006, Bahlsen sold Biscuiterie Saint-Michel to the Morina Baie Biscuits group. In 2008, Morina Baie Biscuits became St Michel Biscuits.

== Bamboula's village controversy ==
Bamboula's Village (French: Village de Bamboula) was an attempt to recreate an Ivory Coast village within the Planète Sauvage zoo (then known as Safari Africain) in Port-Saint-Père, near Nantes, in France. It is considered the last human zoo in France.

In 1994, the biscuit brand Biscuiterie Saint-Michel teamed up with the safari park to create the village, naming it "Bamboula's Village" after its "Bamboula" chocolate biscuits, which had a black mascot with the same name (a racial slur, dating from colonial times). The village was constructed in the winter of 1993.

Anti-racist organisations and unions formed the group "Non à la réserve humaine" ["No to the Human Zoo"] and began legal action against the park. By the time that the court had sent an expert to document human-rights violations, the performers had been ordered out of the country. The village was closed in September 1994. The park had to pay a symbolic one French franc (€0.15) in damages, plus legal fees.

== Processing methods and locations ==
Prior to its takeover by Morina Baie in 2006, Saint-Michel manufactured in three factories: Saint-Michel-Chef-Chef, the historic site, Commercy (Meuse) for madeleines, and Saint-Père-en-Retz. Today, products come out of the eight factories of the St Michel Biscuits group.

Biscuiterie Saint-Michel's food processing operations are certified Origine France Garantie, meaning that the majority of its activities and supplies are located in France.

A network of Saint-Michel boutiques covers Ardevon, Beauvoir, Commercy, Contres, La Rochelle, Nantes, Tours, Saint-Michel-Chef-Chef, Vannes and Saint Malo, as well as an online boutique.
