= Istralandia =

Water park in Croatia

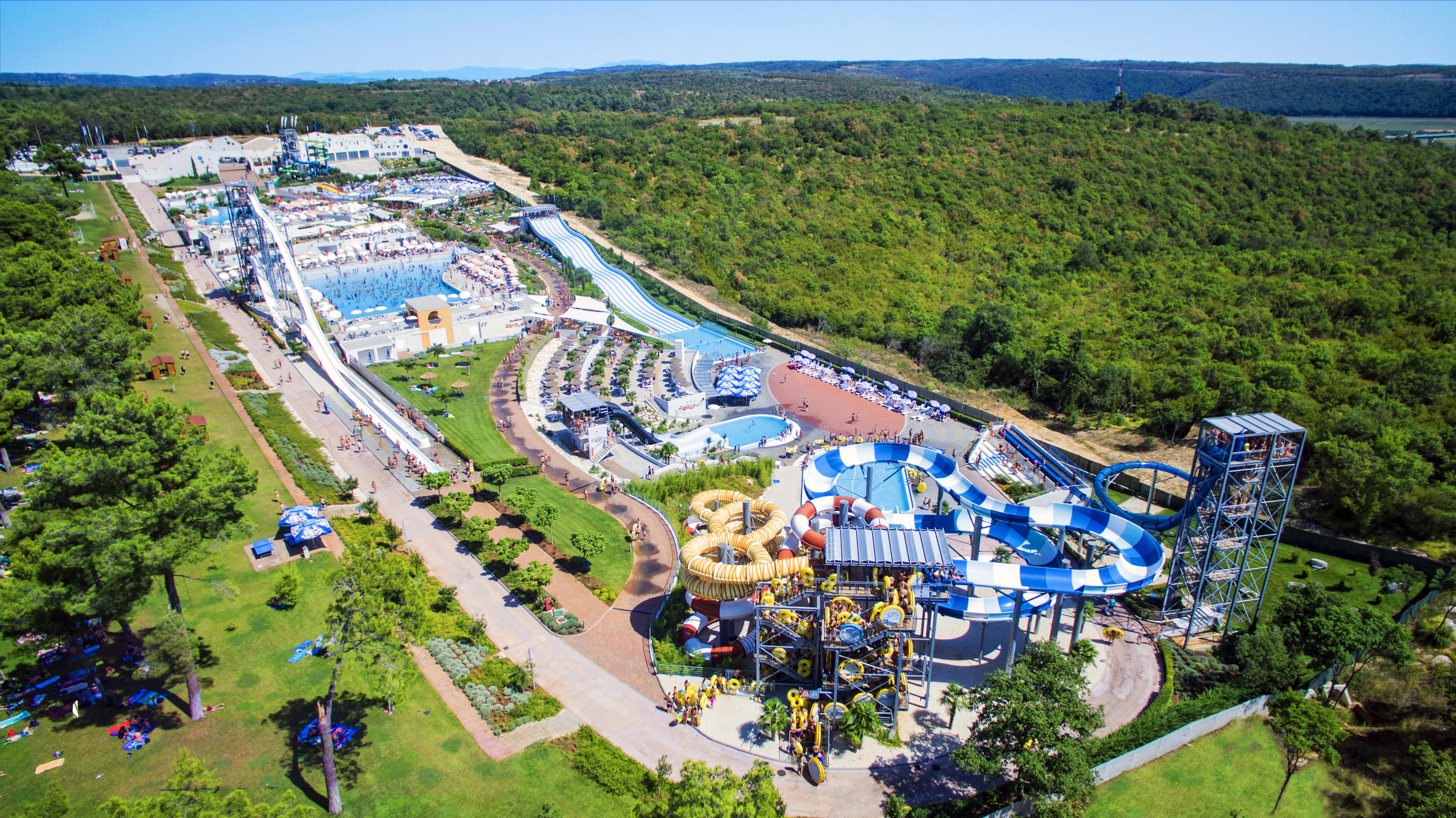
- Interactive map of Istralandia
- Location: Brtonigla, Istria County, Croatia
- Coordinates: 45.346730°N 13.617147°E
- Opened: 21 June 2014
- Slogan: The most entertaining water in Istria
- Operating season: Late May through late September
- Attendance: 180,000 (2015)
- Area: 81,000 m^{2} (870,000 sq ft)

Attractions
- Water rides: 12
- Website: www.istralandia.hr

Istralandia is a water park in Brtonigla municipality, Istria County, Croatia. It is located near the road that leads from Novigrad to Nova Vas, approximately 5 km (3 mi) from the Adriatic Sea. Opened for visitors in June 2014, it was the first Croatian water park.

Istralandia water park covers the area of 81,000 m^{2} (20 acres). It features a 2,500 m^{2} (27,000 sq ft) wave pool, the largest in the Mediterranean, and 20 water slides with the total length of 1.2 km (0.75 mi).

== Awards ==
Aquapark Istralandia won a special award for the entrepreneurial project of the year in the category of new parks in Europe at the 13th Best Amusement Parks Award Ceremony, which took place in Rome on 25 October 2014. The Parksmania award is a prestigious recognition awarded by the Parksmania.it magazine to the best amusement parks in Italy and Europe.

In the 2016 Euro Attractions Show in Barcelona, hosted by the International Association of Amusement Parks and Attractions, a 34-member international jury ranked Istralandia 5th among more than 300 water parks in Europe.

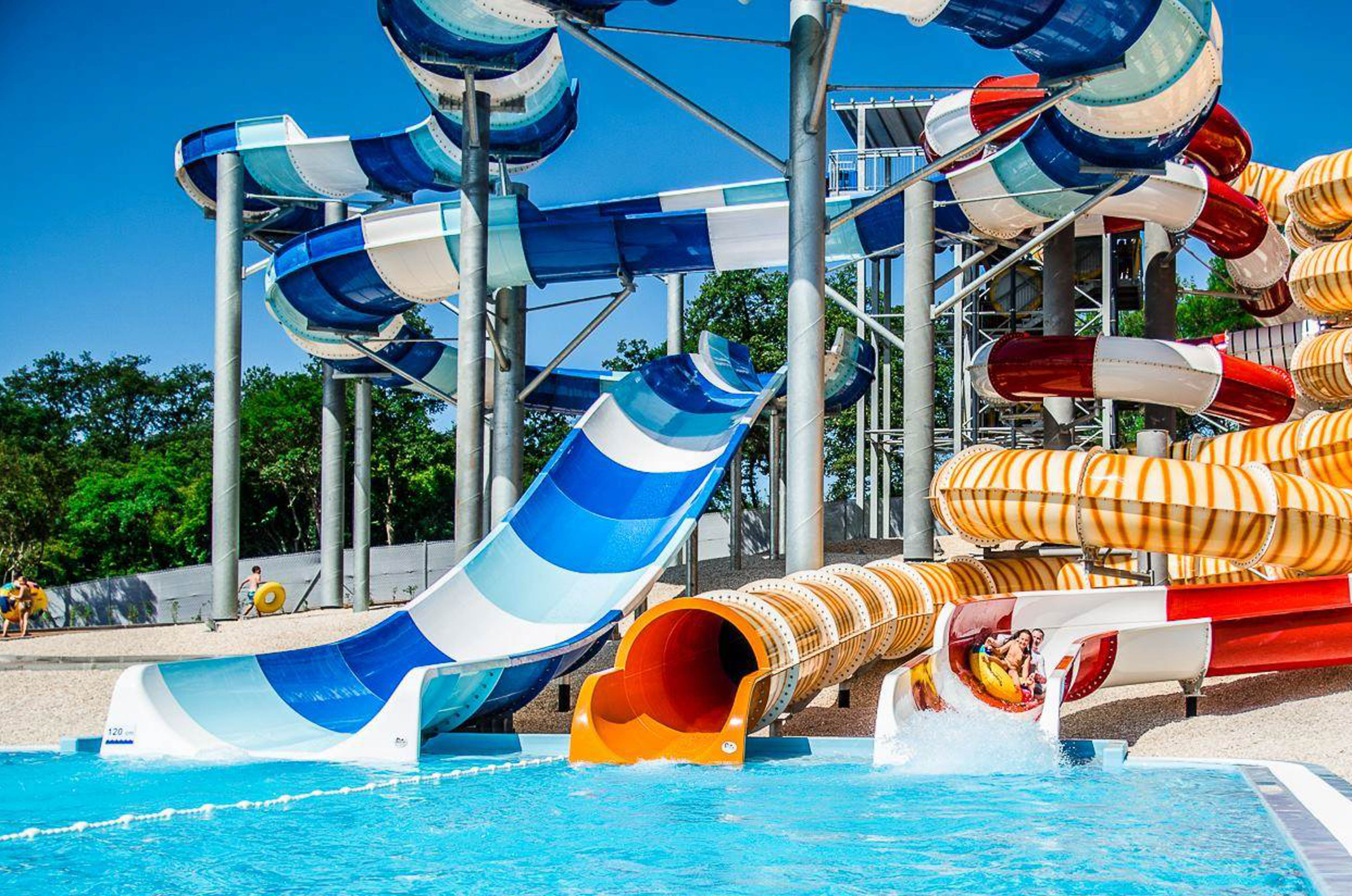

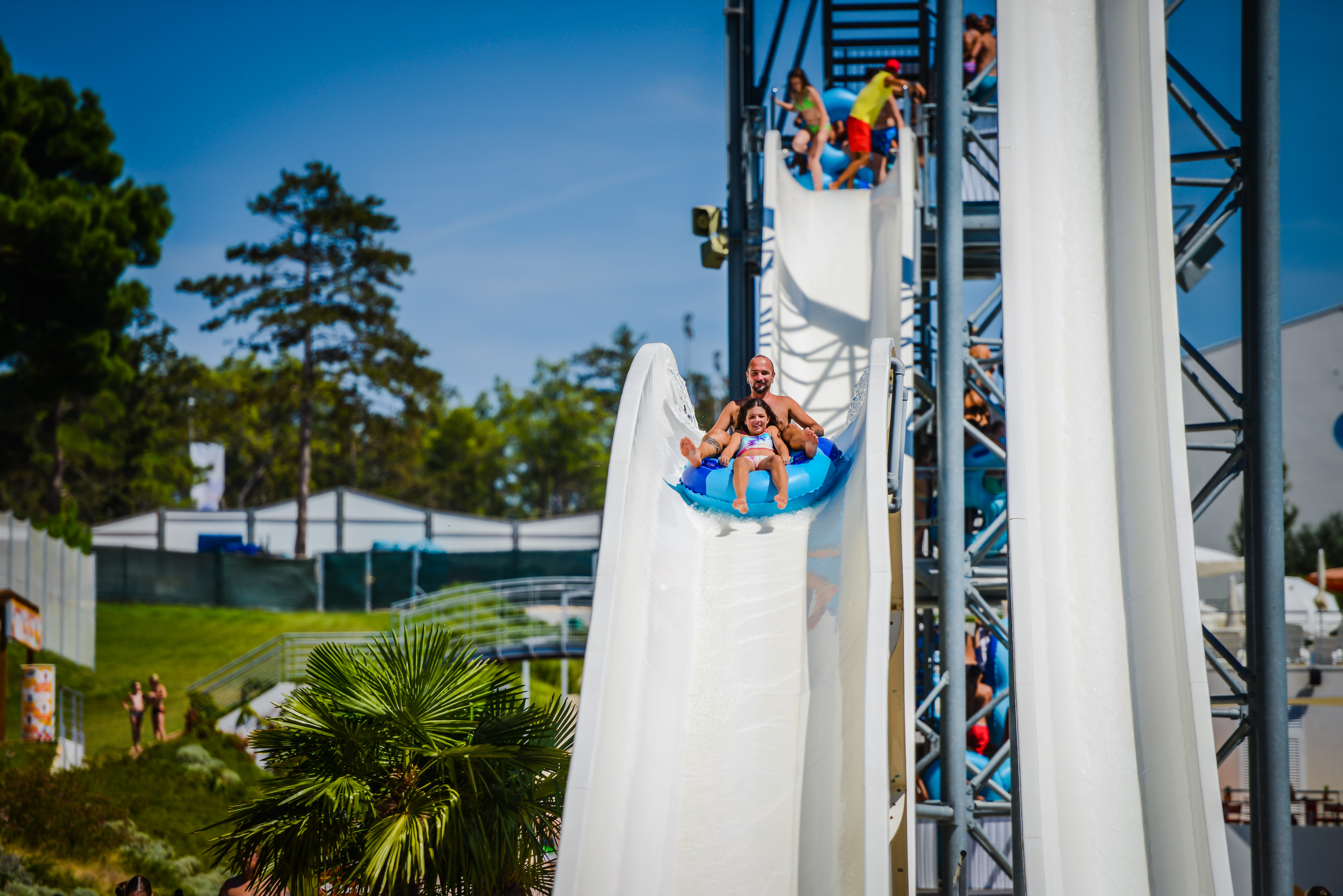

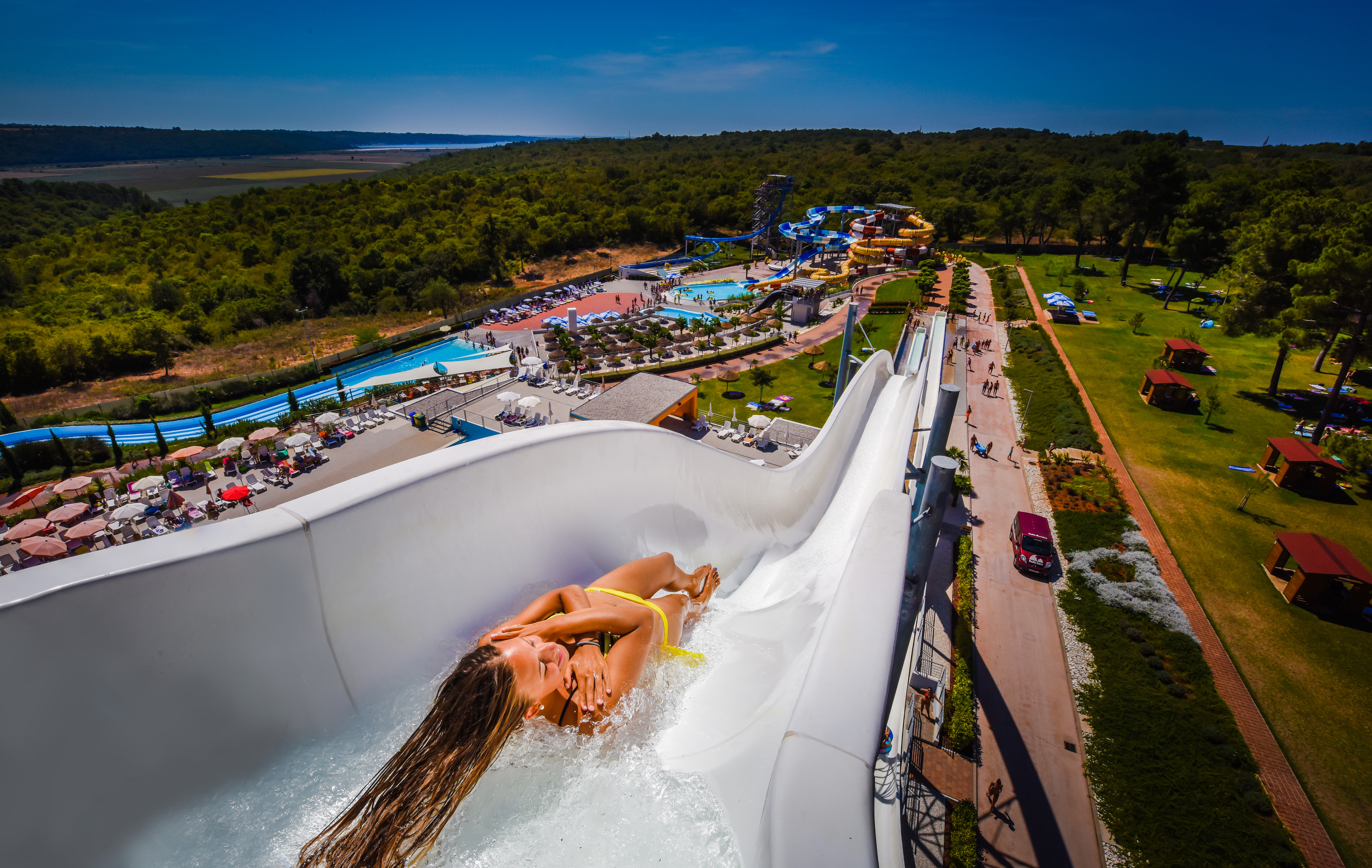

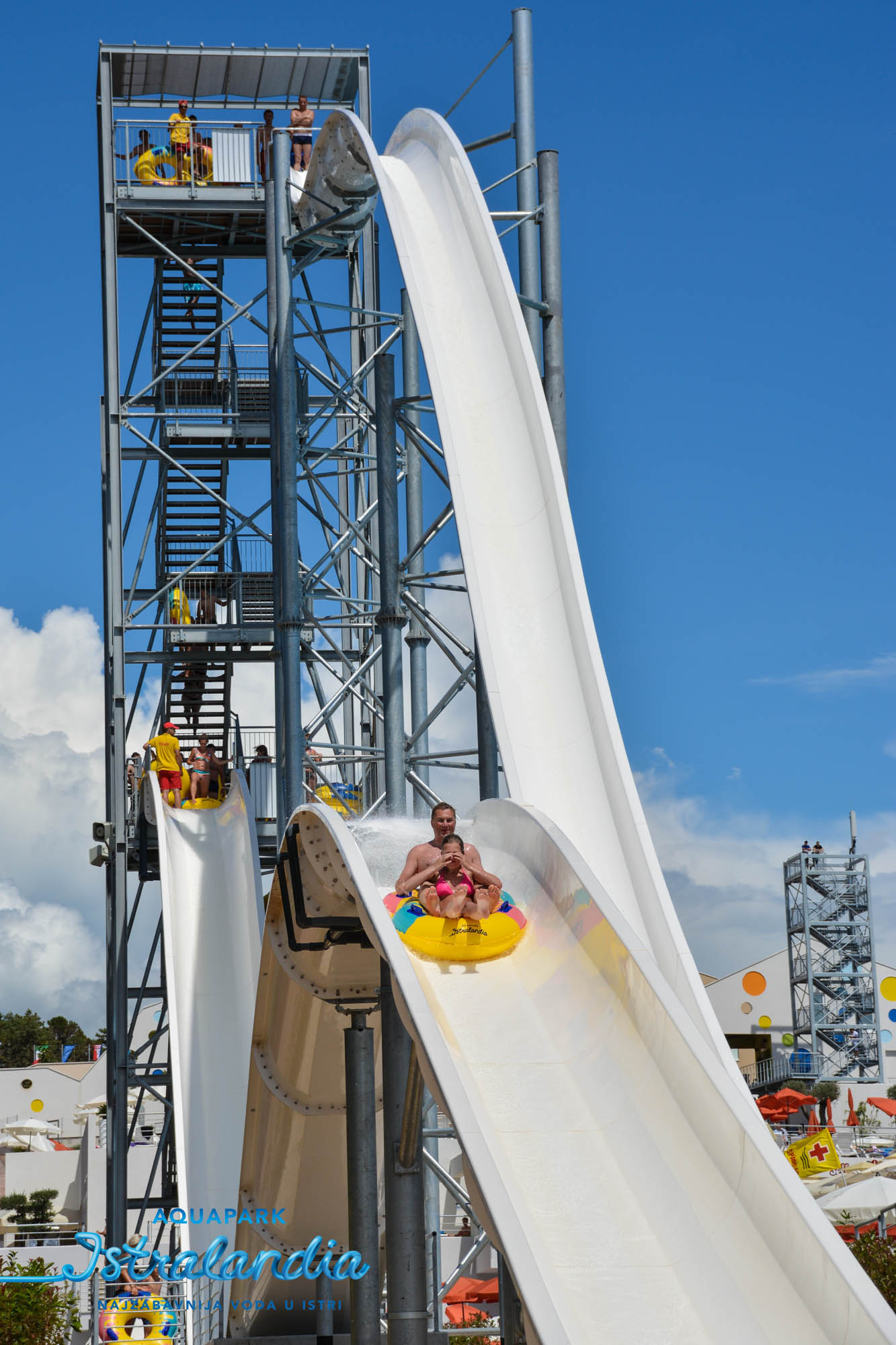
