= Familiepark Drievliet =

Dutch amusement park

Coordinates: 52°3′17.7″N 4°20′58.6″E

Drievliet Family Park
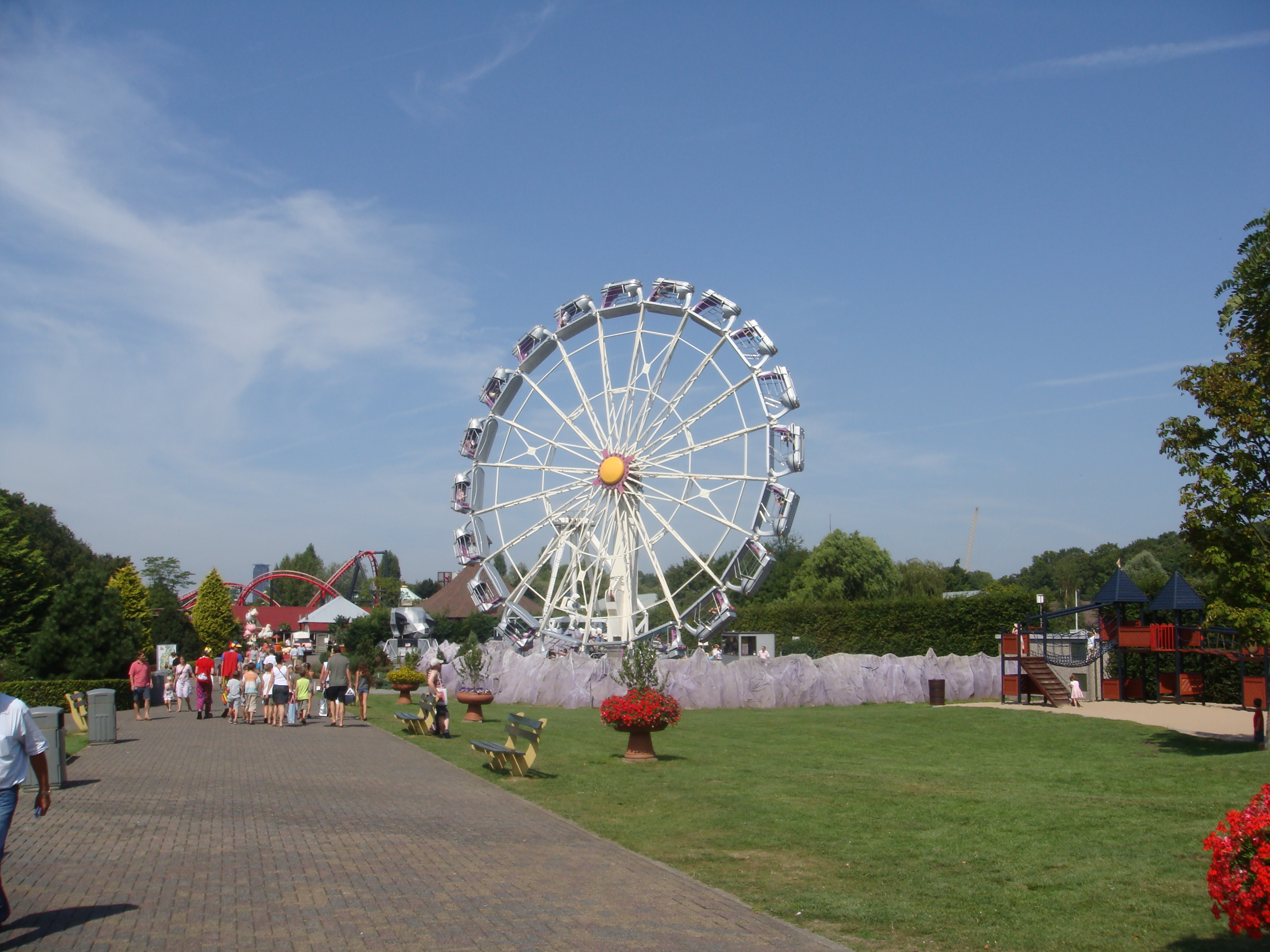
- View of several attractions.
- Interactive map of Drievliet Family Park
- Location: The Hague, South Holland, Netherlands
- Opened: 1938
- Owner: Looping Experiences
- Slogan: Dagje Drievliet, wie wil dat nou niet (A day at Drievliet, who wouldn't want that?)
- Attendance: 300,000
- Area: 8 ha (20 acres)

Attractions
- Total: 31
- Water rides: 2

Drievliet Family Park ("Familiepark Drievliet") is an amusement park in The Hague, South Holland, the Netherlands. The park originated on the grounds of the former Drievliet country estate in nearby Rijswijk, and primarily attracts families and younger visitors.

== History ==
=== Country estate ===
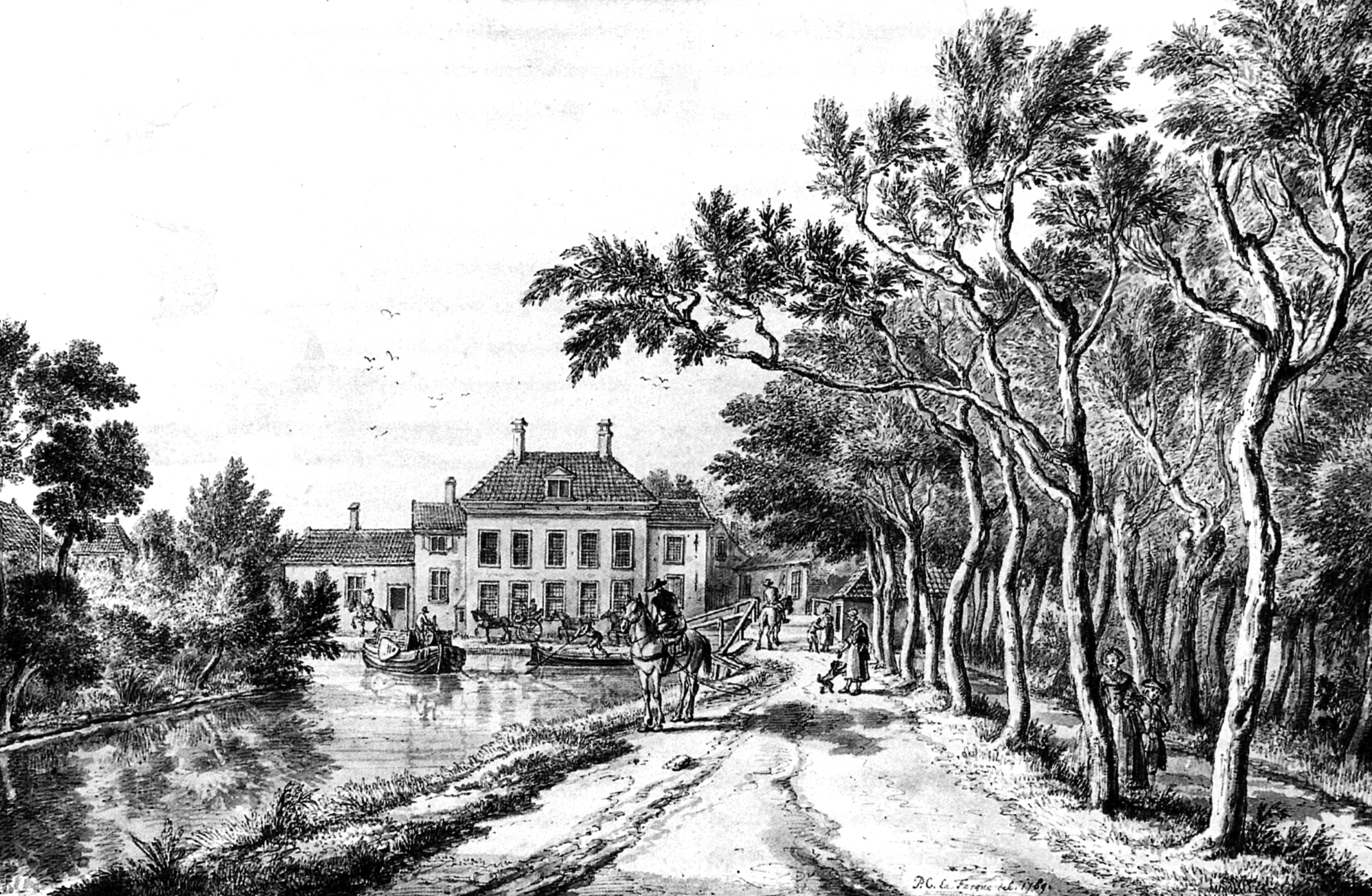
The Drievliet country estate in the 18th century

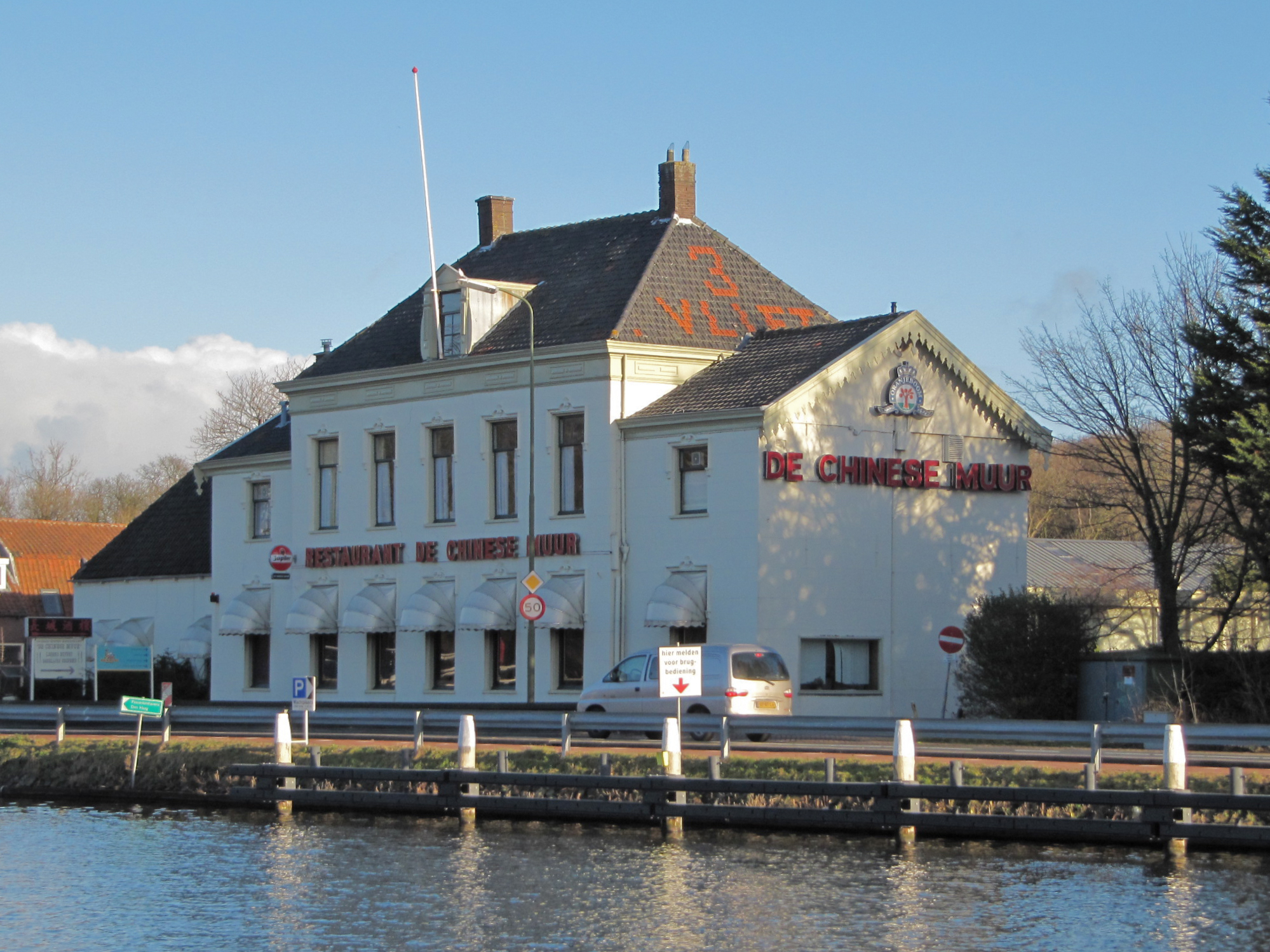
The manor house in 2011

Drievliet derives its name from its location at the junction of three waterways: the Vliet towards Leiden, the Haagse Trekvliet, and the Delftsche Vliet. The estate already appears, complete with an extensive garden, on a map drawn by Floris Balthasars in 1611. The heirs of Ysbrand van der Does, secretary of Amsterdam, sold the estate together with 33 morgen of land in 1625 to Johan van Gogh, clerk of the States General of the Netherlands. Van Gogh is believed to have built the manor house. It is first mentioned in a probate inventory in 1682, and appears again as a landscaped country estate on the 1712 map of the Hoogheemraadschap van Delfland prepared by Nicolaas Cruquius.

Van Gogh gave the estate to his daughter upon her marriage to Arnout van Beaumont, President of the Council of Brabant. Following her death it passed to their son, Andries van Beaumont. The widow of his son Johan van Beaumont later sold the estate to Nicolaas Evert Fournier, an advocate before the Court of Gelderland.

In 1736 Fournier sold the estate to the widow of Jan van der Burg, an advocate before the Court of Holland. In 1874 it was acquired by C.H.Th.A. Hooft Graaflant, who also owned Burchvliet. He remained at Drievliet until his death in 1923.

Following the death of C.H.Th.A. Hooft Graaflant, the estate was acquired by the Faaij family, who opened a café in the manor house and, in 1938, added a tea garden and playground. Following the Second World War there was a puppet theatre, a ventriloquism and magic show. There were also various new attractions and children could also ride donkeys. The combination proved successful, and after visitor numbers continued to grow. The entire estate was purchased in 1950 by N.V. Maatschappij Drievliet. The manor house was converted into a restaurant and around 1985 became a Chinese restaurant.

The classical block-shaped manor house is designated as a Dutch Rijksmonument.

=== Amusement park ===
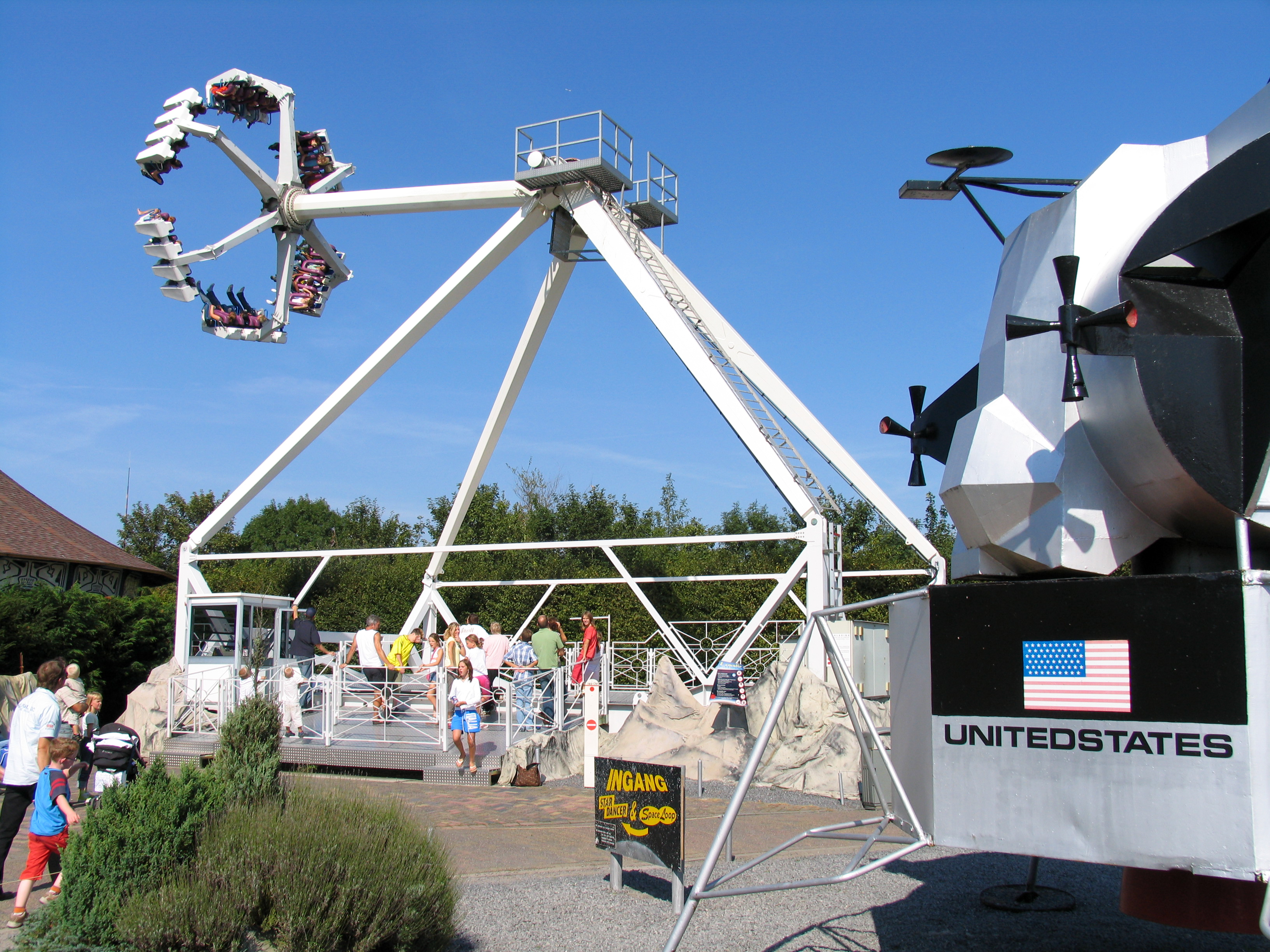
The former attraction Lunatic, now known as Nautilus

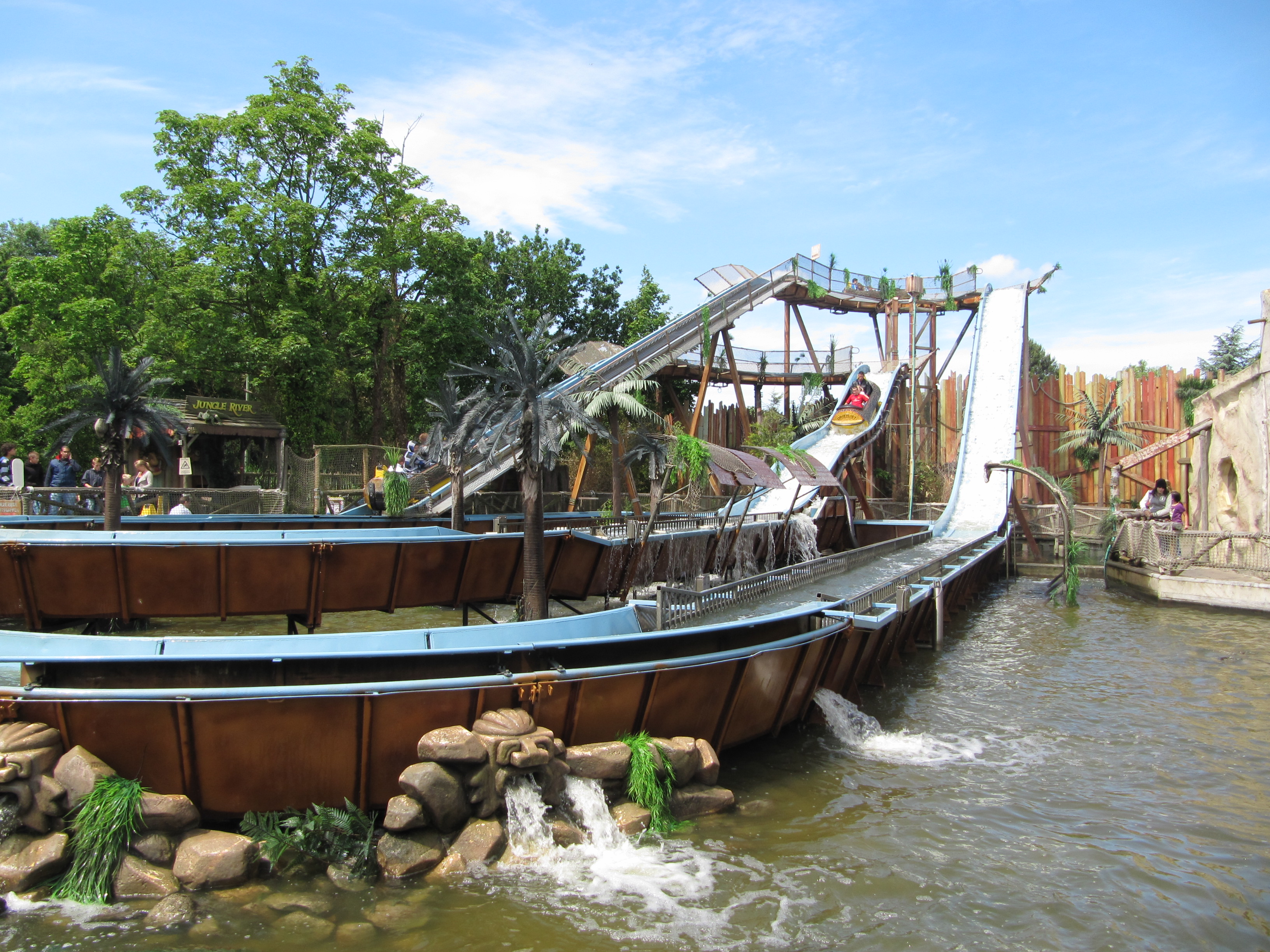
The Jungle River log flume

In 1951 the park installed next to a simple playground with swings and seesaws its first mechanical attraction, a carousel, after which Drievliet was called an amusement park. In addition to seesaws, swings, a roundabout, tall and small slides, the playground featured a maze with a cage of monkeys at its centre, while children could still ride donkeys.

During the following years, numerous fairground attractions were added to the park. The Monorail opened in 1968 and is one of the oldest attractions still in operation, next to the carousel that was installed in 1951. It was the fist monorail in Europe. During the 1990s and 2000s, it expanded its collection of thrill rides, including the attraction Star Dancer (1997-2025) and the pirate ship ride De Piraat.

Over the following decades a variety of fairground attractions were added, including pedal-powered horse racing cars, bumper cars, a swinging boat, another carousel and a puppet theatre. Later expansions added a caterpillar ride, a rocket carousel, an amusement arcade with pinball machines, a cave with distorting mirrors and a child-friendly haunted house.

=== Acquisition ===
In 2024, Drievliet was acquired by the French leisure park operator Looping Experiences.

== In popular culture ==
Several Dutch feature films have been filmed at Drievliet, including Gruesome School Trip (De Griezelbus, 2005), Dik Trom (2010), and Mees Kees (2012). The bus of the Gruesome School Trip is used as decoration next to the haunted house.
