= Amerika =

Amerika is the spelling for "America" in various languages, referring to either the Americas or the United States. It may also refer to:

== Places ==
- Amerika, Saxony, a town in Germany
- Amerika, Netherlands, a hamlet in Drenthe in the Netherlands
- America, Netherlands (Limburgish: Amerika), a hamlet in Limburg in the Netherlands
- Amerika, a village and part of Votice in the Czech Republic

== Literature ==
- Amerika (novel), a 1927 novel by Franz Kafka
- Amerika (magazine), a magazine published by the U.S. State Department during the Cold War
- Amerika (Berg novel), a novel by Sibylle Berg

== Music ==
- Amerika (album), a 1996 album by Bo Kaspers Orkester
- Amerika, an album by BAP
- Amerika, an album by TV-2
- "Amerika" (song), a 2004 song by Rammstein
- "Amerika", a song by Zion I from True & Livin'
- "Amerika", a song by Jakarta
- "Amerika", a song by Rafet El Roman
- "Amerika", a song by Aleksander Vinter
- "Amerika", a song by Wintersleep
- "Amerika", a song by Young the Giant
- "Amerika", a version of "America the Beautiful" by Jaco Pastorius from Invitation

== World War II ==
- Messerschmitt Me 264 or Amerika, a German reconnaissance aircraft
- Amerika Bomber, a Nazi project for a bomber capable of reaching the US
- Amerika, a designation of the Special Train (Führersonderzug) used by Adolf Hitler

== Ships ==
- SS Amerika
  - SS Amerika or SS Celtic (1872), a White Star liner
  - SS Amerika or USS America (ID-3006), a Hamburg America Line liner seized in World War I
- Russian corvette Amerika, a steam corvette built in New York City in 1857

== Other uses ==
- Amerika (nightclub), an LGBT nightclub in Buenos Aires
- Amerika (miniseries), a 1987 American television miniseries
- Amerika: A Notebook in Three Parts, a documentary by Mika Johnson
- Amerika, satirical alternative spelling for America, meaning the United States; usually meant derogatorily.
- Amreeka, a 2009 film (Amreeka the Arabic pronunciation for America)

== See also ==
- America (disambiguation)
- Ameryka (disambiguation)
