= Team Farm Frites–Hartol =

Dutch women's cycling team

Team information
- UCI code: HAR (1999); FAR (2000–2004)
- Registered: The Netherlands
- Founded: 1999
- Discipline: Road
- Status: UCI Women cat. 1 (1999); UCI Women's Team (2000–2004)
- Bicycles: Koga (2000–2004)

Team name history
- 1999 2000–2004: Hartol–Farm Frites; Farm Frites–Hartol

Team Farm Frites–Hartol was a Dutch registered professional Women's cycling team which competed between 1999 and 2004.

The team's marquee riders were Leontien Zijlaard-van Moorsel and Mirjam Melchers-van Poppel.

== Major results ==
1999
Zaandam Criterium, Leontien Zijlaard-van Moorsel
Amerika Criterium, Leontien Zijlaard-van Moorsel
Schijndel Criterium, Sissy Van Alebeek
en Haag Criterium, Leontien Zijlaard-van Moorsel
Utrecht Criterium, Leontien Zijlaard-van Moorsel
Overall Greenery International, Leontien Zijlaard-van Moorsel

Stages 1, 2 & 3, Leontien Zijlaard-van Moorsel
Stage 4, Debby Mansveld

Veldhoven Criterium, Leontien Zijlaard-van Moorsel
Uithoorn Criterium, Leontien Zijlaard-van Moorsel
's-Heerenberg Criterium, Leontien Zijlaard-van Moorsel
Sprang-Capelle Criterium, Hester Marieke Kroes
Wijk bij Duurstede Criterium, Sissy Van Alebeek
Noordwijk Criterium, Leontien Zijlaard-van Moorsel
Overall Boekel, Leontien Zijlaard-van Moorsel

Prologue, Stages 1 & 2, Leontien Zijlaard-van Moorsel

Zevenbergen Criterium, Leontien Zijlaard-van Moorsel
's Gravendeel Criterium, Leontien Zijlaard-van Moorsel
Uden Criterium, Leontien Zijlaard-van Moorsel
Schiedam Criterium, Leontien Zijlaard-van Moorsel

2000
Oud-Vossemeer Criterium, Leontien Zijlaard-van Moorsel
Steenbergen Criterium, Leontien Zijlaard-van Moorsel
Amerika Criterium, Leontien Zijlaard-van Moorsel
Oud-Gastel Criterium, Yvonne Troost-Brunen
Veenendaal Criterium, Debby Mansveld
The Hague Criterium, Yvonne Troost-Brunen
Breezand Criterium, Leontien Zijlaard-van Moorsel
Vlaardingen Criterium, Leontien Zijlaard-van Moorsel
Overall Wervershoof, Leontien Zijlaard-van Moorsel

Prologue & Stage 1, Leontien Zijlaard-van Moorsel
Stage 2, Sissy Van Alebeek

Veldhoven Criterium, Leontien Zijlaard-van Moorsel
Ossendrecht Derny, Leontien Zijlaard-van Moorsel
Kampen Criterium, Leontien Zijlaard-van Moorsel
Lekkerkerk Criterium, Sissy Van Alebeek
Overall Ster van Zeeland, Leontien Zijlaard-van Moorsel

Stages 1 & 2, Leontien Zijlaard-van Moorsel
Stage 3, Sissy Van Alebeek

Stage 1 RaboSter Zeeuwsche Eilanden, Rikke Sandhøj Olsen
Stage 2 RaboSter Zeeuwsche Eilanden, Sharon Van Essen
Stage 3b RaboSter Zeeuwsche Eilanden, Esther Van Der Helm
Obdam Criterium, Leontien Zijlaard-van Moorsel
Ochten Criterium, Debby Mansveld
Boxmeer Criterium, Debby Mansveld
Alblasserdam Criterium, Susanne Ljungskog
Barendrecht Criterium, Andrea Bosman
Maastricht Derny, Leontien Zijlaard-van Moorsel
Oostvoorne Criterium, Leontien Zijlaard-van Moorsel
Varik Criterium, Leontien Zijlaard-van Moorsel
Overall Boekel, Leontien Zijlaard-van Moorsel

Stages 1, 2a & 2b, Leontien Zijlaard-van Moorsel

Kortenhoef Criterium, Esther Van Der Helm
Overall Trophée d'Or Féminin, Leontien Zijlaard-van Moorsel
Stage 2 Holland Ladies Tour, Madeleine Lindberg
Zoetermeer Criterium, Debby Mansveld
Diegem Cyclo-cross, Debby Mansveld

2001
Zeddam Cyclo-cross, Daphny van den Brand
Wetzikon Cyclo-cross, Hanka Kupfernagel
Oostmalle Cyclo-cross, Daphny van den Brand
Oud-Vossemeer Criterium, Leontien Zijlaard-van Moorsel
Haarsteeg Criterium, Sonja Van Kuik-Pfister
Breezand Criterium, Leontien Zijlaard-van Moorsel
Vlaardingen Criterium, Leontien Zijlaard-van Moorsel
Wervershoof Criterium, Sissy Van Alebeek
Lausanne Criterium, Leontien Zijlaard-van Moorsel
Overall Ster van Zeeland, Leontien Zijlaard-van Moorsel

Stage 1, Anouska van der Zee
Stages 2 & 3, Leontien Zijlaard-van Moorsel

Rotterdam Criterium, Madeleine Lindberg
Lekkerkerk Criterium, Leontien Zijlaard-van Moorsel
Kampen Criterium, Esther Van Der Helm
Overall Vuelta Castilla y Leon, Margaret Hemsley

Stages 1 & 3, Margaret Hemsley

Meerkerk Criterium, Madeleine Lindberg
Haaften Criterium, Sonja Van Kuik-Pfister
Stage 1 RaboSter Zeeuwsche Eilanden, Anouska van der Zee
Stage 2 RaboSter Zeeuwsche Eilanden, Sharon Van Essen
Stage 3b RaboSter Zeeuwsche Eilanden, Yvonne Troost-Brunen
Noordwijk Criterium, Leontien Zijlaard-van Moorsel
Obdam Criterium, Leontien Zijlaard-van Moorsel
Bochum Criterium, Sharon Van Essen
Epe Criterium, Sissy Van Alebeek
Alblasserdam Criterium, Madeleine Lindberg
Barendrecht Criterium, Sissy Van Alebeek
Boxmeer Criterium, Hanka Kupfernagel
Stiphout Criterium, Leontien Zijlaard-van Moorsel
Roosendaal Criterium, Leontien Zijlaard-van Moorsel
Surhuisterveen Criterium, Leontien Zijlaard-van Moorsel
Oostvoorne Criterium, Leontien Zijlaard-van Moorsel
Varik Criterium, Bertine Spijkerman
Dortmund Criterium, Hanka Kupfernagel
Zevenbergen Criterium, Sonja Van Kuik-Pfister
Heerhugowaard Criterium, Sissy Van Alebeek
Overall Boekel, Leontien Zijlaard-van Moorsel

Stage 1, Yvonne Troost-Brunen
Stages 2 & 3, Leontien Zijlaard-van Moorsel

Sint Michielsgestel Cyclo-cross, Daphny van den Brand
Huijbergen Cyclo-cross, Daphny van den Brand
Frankfurt am Main Cyclo-cross, Hanka Kupfernagel
Amersfoort Cyclo-cross, Daphny van den Brand
Wortegem Cyclo-cross, Hanka Kupfernagel
Overijse Cyclo-cross, Daphny van den Brand
Hofstade Cyclo-cross, Daphny van den Brand
Loenhout Cyclo-cross, Daphny van den Brand
Lutterbach Cyclo-cross, Hanka Kupfernagel

2002
Egmond aan Zee Mountainbike, Leontien Zijlaard-van Moorsel
Stage 1 Tour de Snowy, Mirjam Melchers-van Poppel
Stage 1 Tour de Snowy, Mirjam Melchers-van Poppel
Oud-Vossemeer, Mirjam Melchers-van Poppel
Primavera Rosa, Mirjam Melchers-van Poppel
Breezand Criterium, Arenda Grimberg
Oud-Gastel Criterium, Anouska van der Zee
Damesronde van Drenthe, Leontien Zijlaard-van Moorsel
Steenbergen Criterium, Arenda Grimberg
Amstel Gold Race, Leontien Zijlaard-van Moorsel
Made Criterium, Kirsty Nicole Robb
Enkhuizen Criterium, Leontien Zijlaard-van Moorsel
Overall Wervershoof, Leontien Zijlaard-van Moorsel

Stages 1 & 2, Leontien Zijlaard-van Moorsel

Rotterdam Criterium, Leontien Zijlaard-van Moorsel
Ossendrecht Derny, Leontien Zijlaard-van Moorsel
Stage 9 Tour de l'Aude Cycliste Féminin, Arenda Grimberg
UCI Track World Cup Moscow (Individual Pursuit), Leontien Zijlaard-van Moorsel
's-Heerenberg Criterium, Arenda Grimberg
Overall RaboSter Zeeuwsche Eilanden, Leontien Zijlaard-van Moorsel

Stages 1, 2 & 3a, Leontien Zijlaard-van Moorsel
Stage 3b, Arenda Grimberg

Zwijndrecht Criterium, Arenda Grimberg
Obdam Criterium, Leontien Zijlaard-van Moorsel
Epe Criterium, Leontien Zijlaard-van Moorsel
Barendrecht Criterium, Leontien Zijlaard-van Moorsel
Venhuizen Criterium, Leontien Zijlaard-van Moorsel
Stiphout Criterium, Leontien Zijlaard-van Moorsel

2003
Egmond aan Zee Mountainbike, Suzanne De Goede
Oud-Vossemeer Criterium, Mirjam Melchers-van Poppel
Haarsteeg Criterium, Mirjam Melchers-van Poppel
Valladolid Criterium, Mirjam Melchers-van Poppel
Oud-Gastel Criterium, Mirjam Melchers-van Poppel
Overall Damesronde van Drenthe, Mirjam Melchers-van Poppel

Stage 2, Mirjam Melchers-van Poppel

Breezand Criterium, Suzanne De Goede
Borsele Criterium, Leontien Zijlaard-van Moorsel
Rotterdam Criterium, Leontien Zijlaard-van Moorsel
Tjejtrampet Criterium, Leontien Zijlaard-van Moorsel
Lekkerkerk Criterium, Leontien Zijlaard-van Moorsel
Amerika Criterium, Mirjam Melchers-van Poppel
's-Heerenberg Criterium, Arenda Grimberg
Overall RaboSter Zeeuwsche Eilanden, Mirjam Melchers-van Poppel

Stage 1, Mirjam Melchers-van Poppel

Wijk bij Duurstede Criterium, Sissy Van Alebeek
Noordwijk Criterium, Leontien Zijlaard-van Moorsel
Polsbroek Criterium, Leontien Zijlaard-van Moorsel
Kaatsheuvel Criterium, Arenda Grimberg
Obdam Criterium, Anouska van der Zee
Epe Criterium, Leontien Zijlaard-van Moorsel
Barendrecht Criterium, Leontien Zijlaard-van Moorsel
Stiphout Criterium, Arenda Grimberg
Roosendaal Criterium, Sissy Van Alebeek
Oostvoorne Criterium, Arenda Grimberg
Varik Criterium, Elsbeth Van Rooy-Vink
Nispen Criterium, Arenda Grimberg
Stage 3 (TTT) Holland Ladies Tour
World hour record, Leontien Zijlaard-van Moorsel
Boxtel Cyclo-cross, Mirjam Melchers-van Poppel
Zeddam Cyclo-cross, Mirjam Melchers-van Poppel
Reusel Cyclo-cross, Mirjam Melchers-van Poppel
Eindhoven Cyclo-cross, Elsbeth Van Rooy-Vink

2004
Oud-Vossemeer Criterium, Leontien Zijlaard-van Moorsel
Honselersdijk Criterium, Sissy Van Alebeek
Overall Vuelta Castilla y Leon, Mirjam Melchers-van Poppel

Stage 3, Mirjam Melchers-van Poppel

Valladolid Criterium, Angela Brodtka
UCI Track World Cup Manchester (500m time trial), Yvonne Hijgenaar
Overall Damesronde van Drenthe, Sissy Van Alebeek

Stage 2, Sissy Van Alebeek

Breezand Criterium, Leontien Zijlaard-van Moorsel
Apeldoorn Criterium, Leontien Zijlaard-van Moorsel
Oud-Gastel Criterium, Sissy Van Alebeek
Made Criterium, Leontien Zijlaard-van Moorsel
Veldhoven Criterium, Leontien Zijlaard-van Moorsel
Haren Criterium, Sissy Van Alebeek
UCI Track World Cup Sydney (500m time trial), Yvonne Hijgenaar
UCI Track World Cup Sydney (Scratch race), Adrie Visser
Lekkerkerk Criterium, Esther Van Der Helm
Stage 7 Tour de l'Aude Cycliste Féminin, achel Heal
Rijsoord Criterium, Anouska van der Zee
Stage 10 Tour de l'Aude Cycliste Féminin, Angela Brodtka
Wijk bij Duurstede Criterium, Sissy Van Alebeek
Stage 1 RaboSter Zeeuwsche Eilanden, Angela Brodtka
Zwijndrecht Criterium, Leontien Zijlaard-van Moorsel
Stage 9 Giro Rosa, Angela Brodtka
Obdam, Leontien Zijlaard-van Moorsel
Valkenburg aan de Geul Criterium, Mirjam Melchers-van Poppel
Barendrecht Criterium, Leontien Zijlaard-van Moorsel
Stiphout Criterium, Leontien Zijlaard-van Moorsel
Alblasserdam Criterium, Adrie Visser
Chaam Criterium, Leontien Zijlaard-van Moorsel
Bühl Criterium Mirjam Melchers-van Poppel
Bühl Criterium, Leontien Zijlaard-van Moorsel
Roosendaal Criterium, Mirjam Melchers-van Poppel
Oostvoorne Criterium, Mirjam Melchers-van Poppel
Overall Holland Ladies Tour, Mirjam Melchers-van Poppel

Stage 1b (TTT) Holland Ladies Tour
Stage 2, Mirjam Melchers-van Poppel

Stage 1b Giro della Toscana Int. Femminile, Angela Brodtka
Lisse Criterium, Sissy Van Alebeek
Woerden Cyclo-cross, Mirjam Melchers-van Poppel
Reusel Cyclo-cross, Mirjam Melchers-van Poppel

== National Champions ==
1999
Netherlands Time Trial, Leontien Zijlaard-van Moorsel

2000
Netherlands Track (Points race), Leontien Zijlaard-van Moorsel
Netherlands Track (Individual pursuit), Leontien Zijlaard-van Moorsel
Netherlands Time Trial, Leontien Zijlaard-van Moorsel
Olympic Games Road Race, Leontien Zijlaard-van Moorsel
Olympic Games Time Trial, Leontien Zijlaard-van Moorsel
Olympic Games Track (Individual pursuit), Leontien Zijlaard-van Moorsel

2001
World Track (Individual Pursuit), Leontien Zijlaard-van Moorsel
Netherlands Cyclo-cross, Daphny van den Brand
World Cyclo-cross, Hanka Kupfernagel
Netherlands Road Race, Sissy Van Alebeek
Netherlands Track (Points race), Leontien Zijlaard-van Moorsel
Netherlands Track (Individual pursuit), Leontien Zijlaard-van Moorsel
Netherlands Time Trial, Leontien Zijlaard-van Moorsel

2002
World Track (Individual Pursuit), Leontien Zijlaard-van Moorsel
Netherlands Road Race, Arenda Grimberg
Netherlands Time Trial, Leontien Zijlaard-van Moorsel
Netherlands Track (Points race), Leontien Zijlaard-van Moorsel
Netherlands Track (Individual pursuit), Leontien Zijlaard-van Moorsel

2003
World Track (Individual Pursuit), Leontien Zijlaard-van Moorsel
Netherlands Road Race, Suzanne De Goede
Japan Road Race, Miho Oki
Netherlands Mountainbike (XC), Elsbeth Van Rooy-Vink

2004
Netherlands Cyclo-cross, Mirjam Melchers-van Poppel
Netherlands Time Trial, Mirjam Melchers-van Poppel
Netherlands Road Race, Leontien Zijlaard-van Moorsel
Japan Road Race, Miho Oki
Olympic Games Time Trial, Leontien Zijlaard-van Moorsel
