= Ameryka =

Ameryka (the Polish spelling of "America") is the name of the following villages in Poland:

- Ameryka, Lublin Voivodeship (east Poland)
- Ameryka, Kartuzy County in Pomeranian Voivodeship (north Poland)
- Ameryka, Słupsk County in Pomeranian Voivodeship (north Poland)
- Ameryka, Warmian-Masurian Voivodeship (north Poland)
- Ameryka, Opole Voivodeship (south Poland)

== Other uses ==
- Ameryka (magazine), Polish language edition of Amerika Russian language magazine, a propaganda publication distributed by the US during the Cold War

== See also ==
- America (disambiguation)
- Amerika (disambiguation)
