= List of 2000 UCI Women's Teams =

Listed below are the 2000 UCI Women's Teams that competed in 2000 women's road cycling events organized by the International Cycling Union (UCI).

UCI code	Team Name	Country
ADO	Acca Due O-Lorena Camicie	Lithuania
ATC	Autotrader.com Cycling Team	United States
EDI	Edilsavino	Italy
NUR	Equipe Nürnberger	Germany
GAS	Gas Sport Team	Italy
RDV	La Rosa Dei Venti	Italy
MAS	Master Team-Carpe Diem	Italy
MIC	S.C. Michela Fanini Record Rox	Italy
SAT	Saturn Cycling Team	United States
ALF	Team Alfa Lum R.S.M.	San Marino
ALI	Team Aliverti-Immobiliare Luca	Italy
TBU	Team Bulls	Germany
ELI	Team Elita	Canada
FAR	Team Farm Frites-Hartol	Netherlands
TLF	Team Lolland-Falster	Denmark
TIM	Timex Women's Professional Cycling Team	United States
TOA	Toscany Ahoy	Netherlands
VLA	Vlaanderen 2002-Ladies Team	Belgium
