= List of 2002 UCI Women's Teams =

Listed below are the 2002 UCI Women's Teams that competed in 2002 women's road cycling events organized by the International Cycling Union (UCI).

UCI code	Team Name	Country
ADO	Acca Due O Pasta Zara Lorena Camicie	Lithuania
AHH	Amoroso's / HH Racing Team	Canada
BON	Bonda-Lukowski Ex Mlyn	Poland
CAM	C.A. Mantes La Ville 78	France
DEI	Deia-Pragma-Colnago	Ukraine
EDI	Edilsavino	Italy
RON	Equipe Cycliste Rona	Canada
NUR	Equipe Nürnberger Versicherung	Germany
FIG	Figurella Dream Team	Italy
ITR	Itera Team	Italy
NEC	Neckermann Beneluxteam	Belgium
OND	Ondernemers van Nature	Netherlands
PTG	Petrogradets	Russia
POW	Power-Plate-Bik	Netherlands
MIC	S.C. Michela Fanini Record Rox	Italy
SAW	Saturn Cycling Team	United States
ALI	Team Aliverti Kookai Imm. Luca Atet	Italy
FAR	Team Farm Frites–Hartol	Netherlands
GRA	Team Grace Cycling	Denmark
RAS	Team Raschiani–Alfa Lum R.S.M.	San Marino
SPO	Team Sponsor Service	Norway
TMO	Team T-Mobile USA	United States
TVB	Ton van Bemmelen	Netherlands
USC	Usci Chirio	Italy
VLL	Vlaanderen–T-Interim Ladies Team	Belgium
