= SS Amerika =

SS Amerika may refer to the following ships:

- USS America (ID-3006), launched in 1905 as SS Amerika by Harland & Wolff in Belfast for the Hamburg America Line of Germany as a passenger ocean liner, before becoming USS America in 1917
- SS Celtic (1872), an ocean liner renamed in 1893 as SS Amerika by Thingvalla Line of Copenhagen

== See also ==
- Amerika (disambiguation)
- SS America
