= America, Netherlands =

America Amerika
- Village
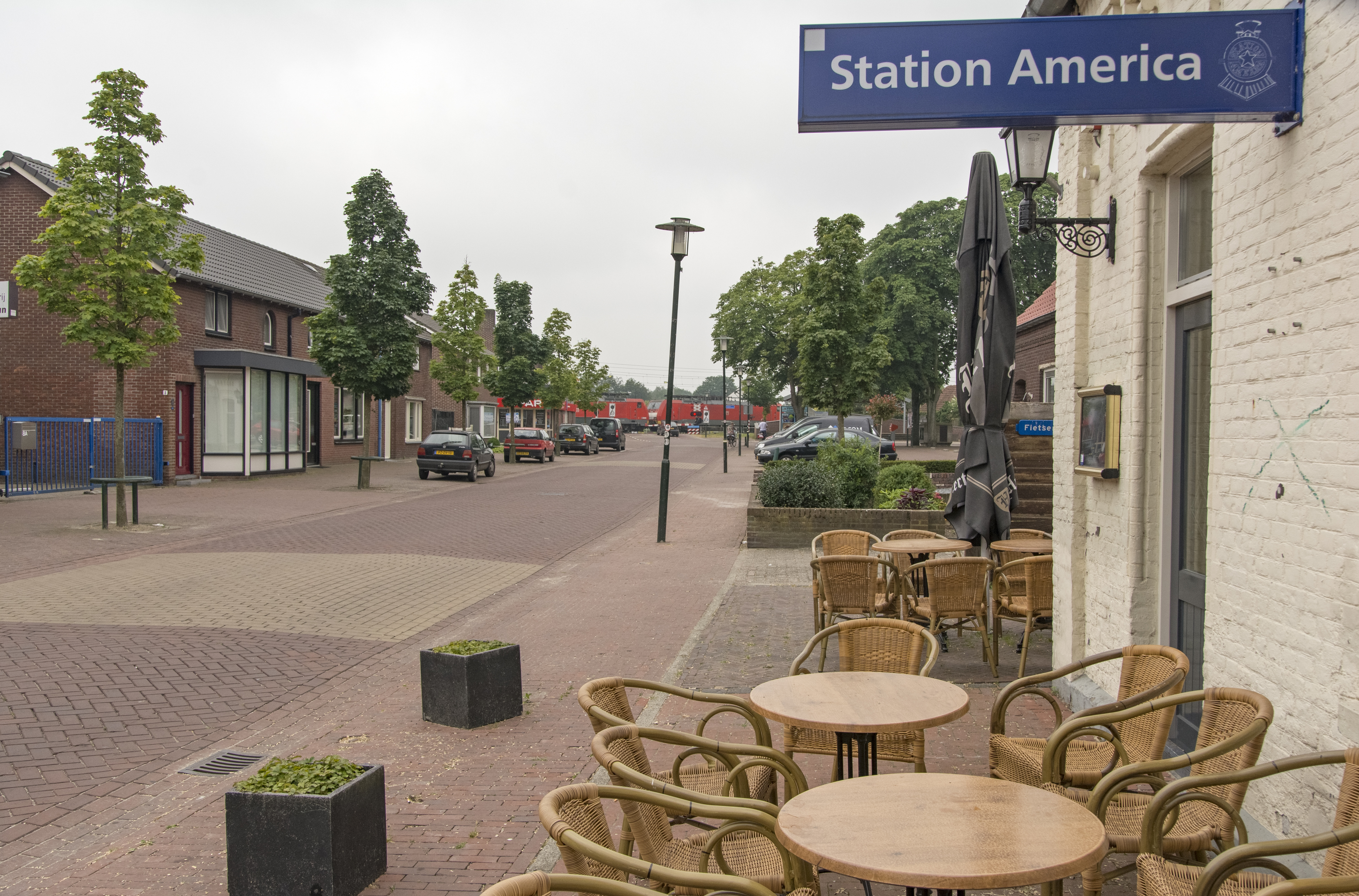
- Pub Station America in America

- Location in the Netherlands Location in the province of Limburg in the Netherlands
- Coordinates: 51°26′16″N 5°58′44″E
- Country: Netherlands
- Province: Limburg
- Municipality: Horst aan de Maas

Area
  - Total: 24.87 km^{2} (9.60 sq mi)
- Elevation: 29 m (95 ft)

Population (2021)
  - Total: 2,055
  - Density: 82.63/km^{2} (214.0/sq mi)
- Time zone: UTC+1 (CET)
  - Summer (DST): UTC+2 (CEST)
- Postal code: 5966
- Dialing code: 077

America (Limburgish: Amerika, Dutch pronunciation: [ɑˈmeːrikaː]) is a parish village in the Dutch province of Limburg, known historically for its peat extraction.

== Geography ==
America is part of the municipality of Horst aan de Maas in Limburg, and lies approximately 15 km (9.3 mi) northwest of Venlo, 23 km (14 mi) east of Helmond, and 16 km (9.9 mi) west of the German border. The town is located within the agricultural Peel region of the Netherlands where peat extraction has been practiced since the Middle Ages. The town is situated approximately 30 m (98 ft) above sea level on the Kabroeksebeek, a stream that flows northeasterly to the Groote Molenbeek stream and eventually to the Meuse.

The area of the town is 24.87 km^{2} (9.60 mi^{2}) and the population as of 2019 is 2,030.

== History ==
America was founded in the late 19th century on the Venlo–Eindhoven railway to serve peat extraction in the area by providing transportation for workers and resources. The town's etymology is uncertain, but it is likely the town was named after the Americas. Other villages with similar foreign names in the Peel region, including California and Siberia, were founded in the same era.

The town's railway station, America Station, opened in 1866 and was rebuilt in 1894. The parish church for America, Saint Joseph's Church, was completed in 1892. The railway station closed in 1938 and the town was captured by the Germans during World War II before being liberated by the British on 22 November 1944. America Station was eventually demolished in 1970, although it has been immortalized by the 1993 album Station America by the local band Rowwen Hèze.

In recent years, as peat extraction has declined surrounding America, reclaimed peatlands have been converted as holiday villages and bungalow resorts including Limburgse Peel and Het Meerdal, both operated by Center Parcs Europe.

== Notable people ==
- Hub van Doorne, founder of manufacturing firm DAF
- Jack Poels, lead singer of Rowwen Hèze
- Joey Litjens, motorcyclist

== Gallery ==
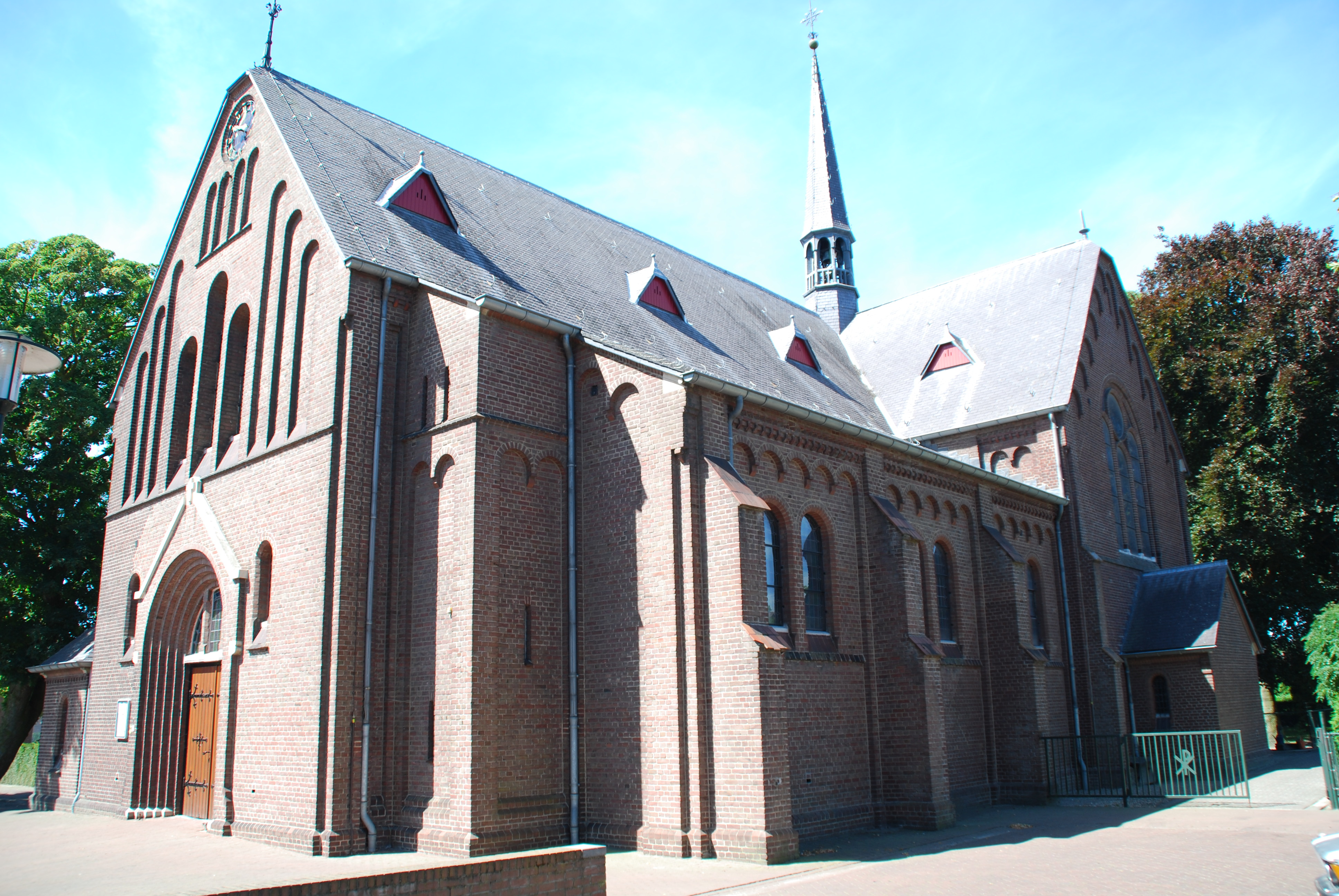
Saint Joseph's Church

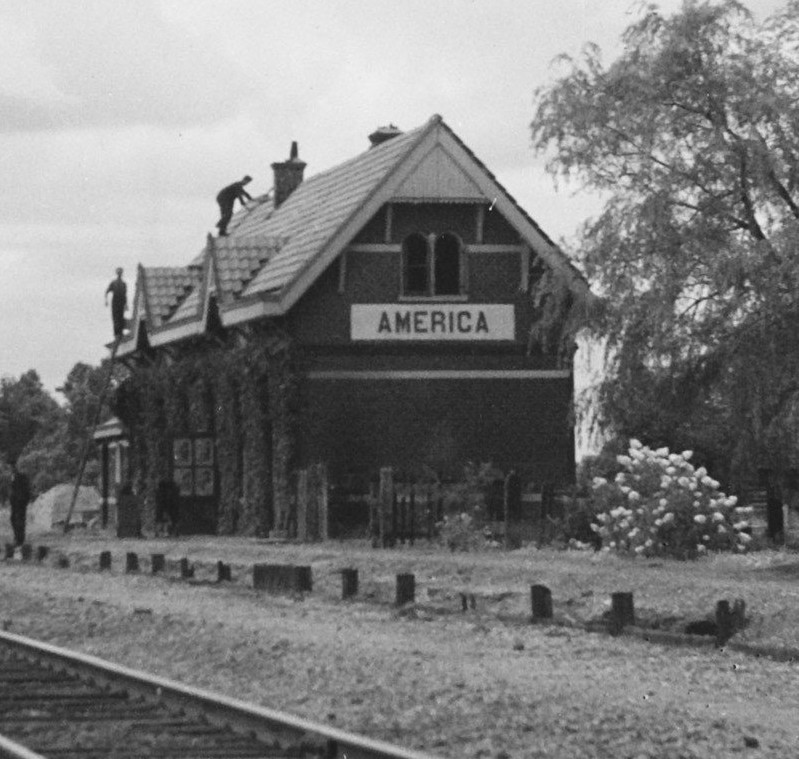
Station America in 1945

== See also ==
- Amerika, Drenthe (Netherlands)
- Amerika, Saxony (Germany)
