= Du borde tycka om mig =

Studio album by Bo Kaspers Orkester
- Released: 31 October 2012
- Genre: Pop, rock, jazz
- Length: 37:37
- Label: Sony Music Entertainment Sweden
- Producer: Christian Walz

Bo Kaspers Orkester chronology
New Orleans (2010)	Du borde tycka om mig (2012)

Du borde tycka om mig is an album by Bo Kaspers Orkester, released in 2012.

== Track listing ==
1. "Festen" – 5:14
2. "Världens ände" – 3:02
3. "Längre upp i bergen" – 3:52
4. "Innan du går" – 4:07
5. "Utan dig" – 4:27
6. "Snart kommer natten" – 2:57
7. "Vilket år" – 4:50
8. "Jag är vacker ikväll" – 2:59
9. "Mitt rätta jag" – 3:20
10. "Kom" – 2:49

== Charts ==
=== Weekly charts ===
Chart (2012–2013)	Peak position
Danish Albums (Hitlisten)	13
Finnish Albums (Suomen virallinen lista)	5
Norwegian Albums (VG-lista)	4
Swedish Albums (Sverigetopplistan)	2

=== Year-end charts ===
Chart (2012)	Position
Swedish Albums (Sverigetopplistan)	19
