= Kaos (Bo Kaspers Orkester album) =

Studio album by Bo Kaspers Orkester
- Released: 2001
- Length: 37:37

Kaos is an album by Swedish jazz band Bo Kaspers Orkester, released in 2001.

== Track listing ==
1. "Människor som ingen vill se" (People that no one wants to see) – 5:14
2. "Ett fullkomligt kaos" (Complete chaos) – 3:02
3. "Ett ögonblick i sänder" (One moment at a time) – 3:52
4. "Det smartaste jag gjort" (The smartest thing I've done) – 4:07
5. "Kasta något tungt" (Throw something heavy) – 4:27
6. "En tur på landet" (A trip to the country) – 2:57
7. "Det vi tycker om" (What we like) – 4:50
8. "Vackert land" (Beautiful country) – 2:59
9. "Det är inte mig det är fel på" (It's not me that's wrong) – 3:20
10. "Innan klockan slagit tolv" (Before the clock struck twelve) – 2:49

== Charts ==
=== Weekly charts ===
Chart (2001)	Peak position
Danish Albums (Hitlisten)	24
Finnish Albums (Suomen virallinen lista)	7
Norwegian Albums (VG-lista)	2
Swedish Albums (Sverigetopplistan)	1

=== Year-end charts ===
Chart (2001)	Position
Swedish Albums (Sverigetopplistan)	5
Chart (2002)	Position
Swedish Albums (Sverigetopplistan)	78
