= Jack Poels =

Dutch musician

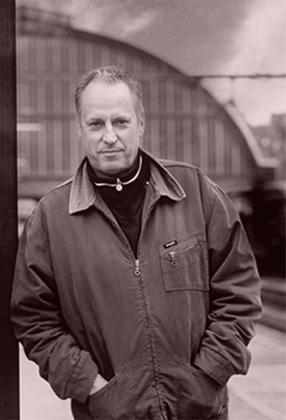
Jack Poels

Jack Poels (born 27 June 1957 in America, Limburg) is the singer, guitarist and harmonica player of the Dutch band Rowwen Hèze for which he has composed almost all the texts and music. His music is some kind of mixture of folk, Tejano and accordion music.

Poels tells a lot about his personal life in his song texts. For example, on the 2001 album Vandaag ("Today") he sings about his newborn son. On the 2003 album Dageraad ("Dawn"), he sings about his real divorce and additional feelings. The texts of the newest Rowwen Hèze album Rodus & Lucius are about how Jack Poels continued his private life after his divorce.

Jack Poels is also a painter. For the album Blieve Loëpe (Limburgish: "Keep on walking") he has made a cartoon of the Statue of Liberty with a cigarette, a clog and a pot of beer. Together with Leon Giesen who is the former bass player of Toontje Lager, Jack Poels has been working on a music project called Holland America Lijn since 2003. On 27 April 2007, Jack Poels received the Order of Orange-Nassau. Veolia Transport Nederland named one of its trains after him. Since the beginning of 2009, Jack Poels has been publishing a poem in the Dutch regional magazine Dagblad de Limburger every two weeks. For the texts of some of these poems, Herberg de Troost – a music collective of Poels and others – have written and released music.
