= Rowwen Hèze =

Dutch band

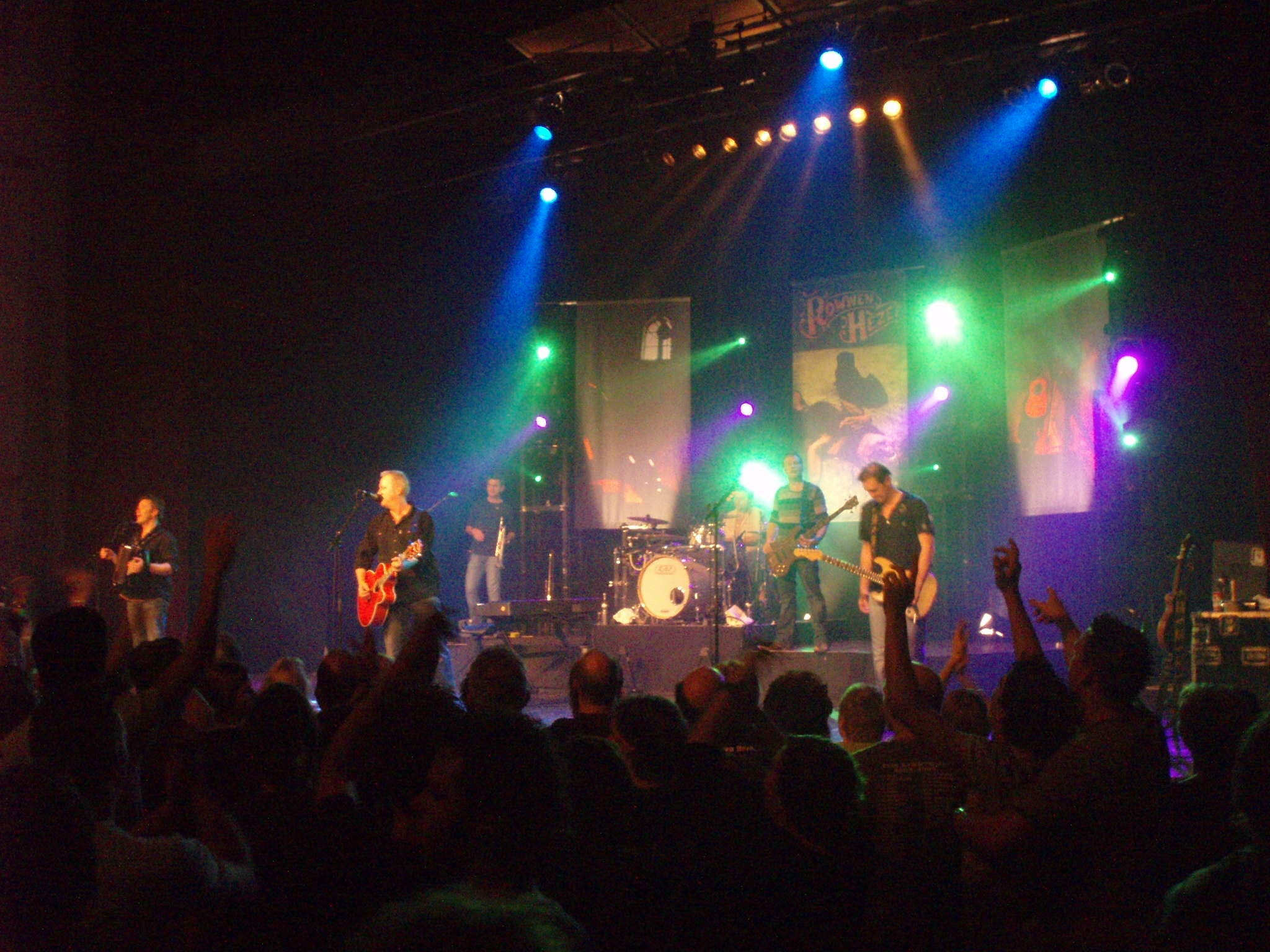
- Rowwen Hèze during a concert in Nijmegen

Background information
- Origin: America, the Netherlands
- Genres: Folk, ska
- Years active: 1985–present
- Labels: RHAM; HKM
- Members: Jack Poels; Theo Joosten; Tren van Enckevort; Wladimir Geels; Jack Haegens; Martîn Rongen
- Past members: Mart Deckers; Geert Hermkes; Jan Philipsen
- Website: www.rowwenheze.nl

Rowwen Hèze is a band from the small village of America in the province of Limburg, the Netherlands. They are one of the biggest bands singing in Limburgish. The band was founded in 1985.

== Music ==
Rowwen Hèze's music is inspired by many different genres of music, including folk, fanfare and tex-mex. Rowwen Hèze draws a lot of inspiration from the songs of The Pogues, as well as from Los Lobos.

Lyrically the band is influenced by every day items like a hangover, the local Fanfare, fatherhood, walking with the dog or songs about a local figure.

== Formation and history ==
The band started with the search for a new lead singer for the band The Legendary Texas Four. Jack Poels, formerly singing in the band Bad Edge, was willing to fulfill this position, on the condition he was allowed to do one song in dialect. The other band members agreed and Rowwen Hèze was born. In the early years they mostly played covers in English. A lot of bands from Limburg compose a song every Carnaval, which is a big cultural event in that region. Rowwen Hèze became known in all of the Netherlands with the Carnaval song "Niks stront niks" (no crap nothing). After that they gradually sang more and more songs in their local dialect.

Since 1991 the band consists of Jack Poels (vocals, guitar and harmonica), William "Tren" van Enckevort (accordion, piano, trombone and vocals), Jan Philipsen (bass guitar and double bass), Theo Joosten (guitar, mandolin, saxophone, tin whistle and percussion), Jack Haegens (trumpet, flugelhorn, trombone and percussion) and Martîn Rongen (drums and percussion). At the 2013 "Slotconcert" (final concert), Jan Philipsen left the band. Wladimir Geels replaces Jan on bass guitar.

Rowwen Hèze have achieved some success in attracting an audience even among Dutch people who have little knowledge of Limburgish dialects; their lyrics are difficult for anyone who does not understand dialects of Limburgish. They have also proved themselves internationally with a particular mix of Tex-Mex, Irish folk, American rock and brass band music.

== Discography ==
=== Albums ===
- Rowwen Hèze (1987)
- Blieve loepe (1990)
- Boem (1991)
- Station America (1993)
- Zondag in 't zuiden (1995)
- Water, lucht en liefde (1997)
- Vandaag (2000)
- Dageraad (2003)
- Rodus & Lucius (2006)
- Zilver (2010)
- Manne van staal (2011)
- Geal (2012)
- Hemel op aarde: De liedjes (2013)
- Vur altied: Ballades & beer (2016)
- De liefde, de muziek, de herinnering (2017)
- Voorwaartsch (2019)
- Onderaan beginne (2021)

=== Live albums ===
- In de wei (1992)
- D.A.D.P.G.S. (2003)
- Andere wind (2004)
- Saus (2008)
- Het beste van het Slotconcert Live 2019 (2020)
- Live in Americana: De wei in 2022 (2022)

=== Compilations ===
- 't Beste van 2 werelden (1999)
- 't Beste van 20 joar - Kilomeaters (2005)
- De zwarte plak (2015)
