= Profronde van Stiphout =

Race details
- Date: End of July
- Region: Stiphout, Netherlands
- English name: Proftour of Stiphout
- Local name: Profronde van Stiphout (in Dutch)
- Discipline: Road race
- Type: criterium
- Web site: www.profronde-stiphout.nl

History
- First edition: Men: 1980; Women: 2001
- Editions: Men: 35 (as of 2014); Women: 14 (as of 2012)
- First winner: Men; Roger De Vlaeminck (BEL); Women; Leontien van Moorsel (NED)
- Most wins: Men; Erik Breukink (NED) (3 wins); Women; Leontien van Moorsel (NED) (3 wins)
- Most recent: Men; Vincenzo Nibali (ITA); Women; Rozanne Slik (NED)

Profronde van Stiphout (English: Proftour of Stiphout), also known as Bavaria Profronde Stiphout due to sponsorship reasons, is an elite men's and women's professional road bicycle racing event held annually in Stiphout, Netherlands. The first edition was in 1980 and since 2001 the event also includes a women's race.

== Honours ==
=== Men’s ===
- 1980 - Roger De Vlaeminck (BEL)
- 1981 - Roger De Vlaeminck (BEL)
- 1982 - Theo Smit (NED)
- 1983 - Joop Zoetemelk (NED)
- 1984 - Theo de Rooij (NED)
- 1985 - Hennie Kuiper (NED)
- 1986 - Greg LeMond (USA)
- 1987 - Pedro Delgado (ESP)
- 1988 - Erik Breukink (NED)
- 1989 - Pedro Delgado (ESP)
- 1990 - Frans Maassen (NED)
- 1991 - Erik Breukink (NED)
- 1992 - Eddy Bouwmans (NED)
- 1993 - Wilfried Nelissen (BEL)
- 1994 - Pjotr Oegroemov (LAT)
- 1995 - Erik Breukink (NED)
- 1996 - Michael Boogerd (NED)
- 1997 - Erik Dekker (NED)
- 1998 - Bart Voskamp (NED)
- 1999 - Jeroen Blijlevens (NED)
- 2000 - Marco Pantani (ITA)
- 2001 - Jan Ullrich (GER)
- 2002 - ~~Lance Armstrong (USA)~~
- 2003 - Jan Ullrich (GER)
- 2004 - ~~Lance Armstrong (USA)~~
- 2005 - Ivan Basso (ITA)
- 2006 - ~~Floyd Landis (USA)~~
- 2007 - Thomas Dekker (NED)
- 2008 - Andy Schleck (LUX)
- 2009 - ~~Alberto Contador (ESP)~~
- 2010 - Robert Gesink (NED)
- 2011 - Mark Cavendish (GBR)
- 2012 - André Greipel (GER)
- 2013 - Chris Froome (GBR)
- 2014 - Vincenzo Nibali (ITA)

=== Women’s ===
- 2001 - Leontien van Moorsel (NED)
- 2002 - Leontien van Moorsel (NED)
- 2003 - Arenda Grimberg (NED)
- 2004 - Leontien van Moorsel (NED)
- 2005 - Adrie Visser (NED)
- 2006 - Moniek Rotmensen (NED)
- 2007 - Ellen van Dijk (NED)
- 2008 - Arenda Grimberg (NED)
- 2009 - Chantal Blaak (NED)
- 2010 - Belinda Goss (AUS)
- 2011 - Amy Cure (AUS)
- 2012 - Nina Kessler (NED)
- 2013 - Amy Pieters (NED)
- 2014 - Rozanne Slik (NED)
