= Bo Kaspers Orkester =

Swedish pop-rock band

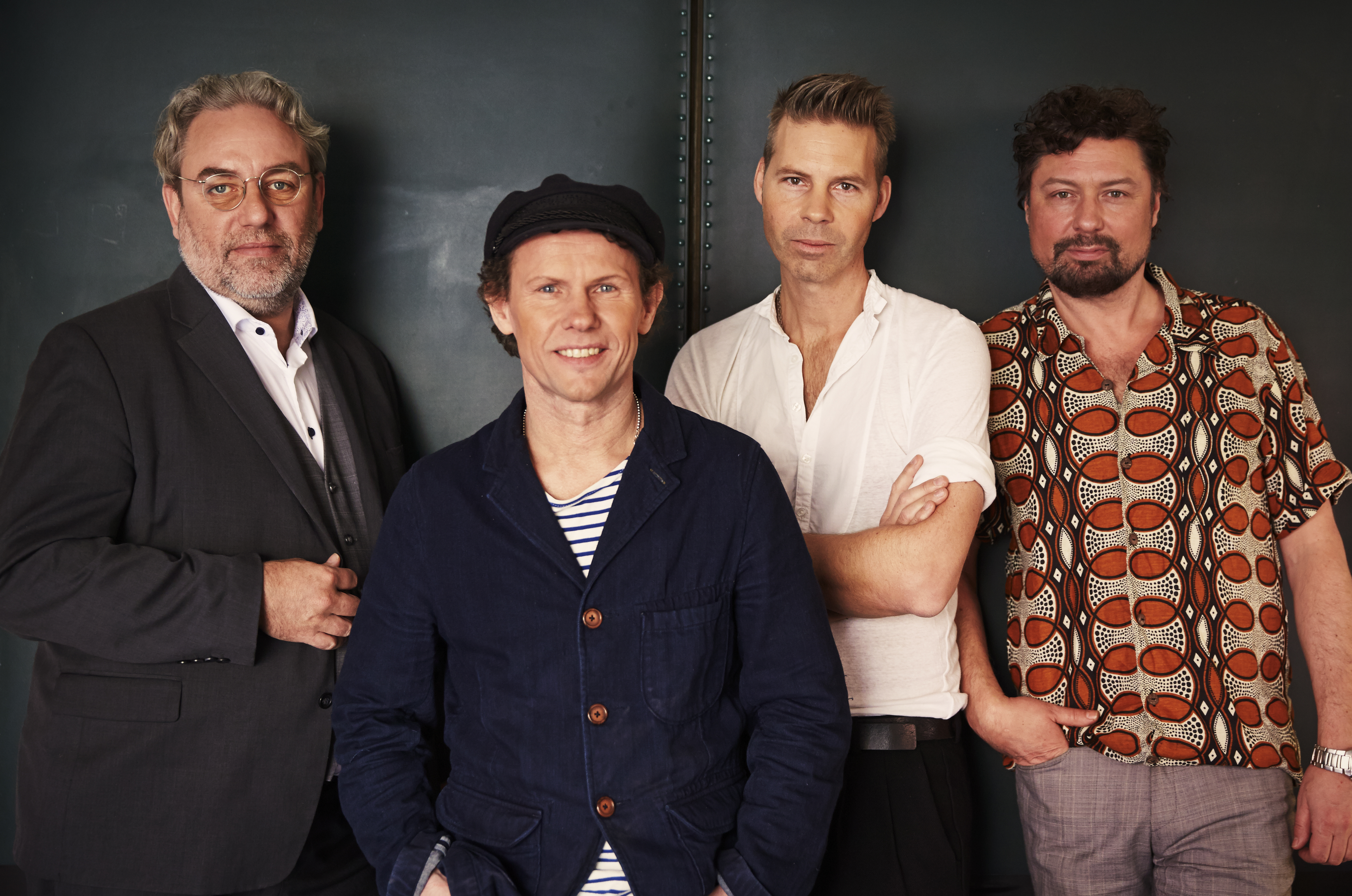

Background information
- Origin: Sweden
- Genres: Pop, rock, jazz, Lounge
- Years active: 1991–present
- Labels: Sony, Columbia
- Members: Bo Sundström; Fredrik Dahl; Michael Malmgren; Mats Schubert
- Past members: Lars Halapi
- Website: BoKaspersOrkesterShow.se

Bo Kaspers Orkester is a Swedish pop-rock band with strong influences of jazz, formed in 1991. Consist of Bo Sundström, Fredrik Dahl, Michael Malmgren and Mats Schubert and won a Grammis award in 1998 for artist of the year.

== Discography ==
=== Albums ===
- Söndag i sängen (1993)
- På hotell (1995)
- Amerika (1996)
- I centrum (1998)
- Kaos (2001)
- Vilka tror vi att vi är (2003)
- Hund (2006)
- 8 (2008)
- New Orleans (2010)
- Du borde tycka om mig (2012)
- Redo Att Gå Sönder (2015)
- 23:55 (2019)
- I denna mörka vintertid (2021)
- Landet vi arvde (2023)
- Just nar vi trodde allt var over (2026)

=== Compilations ===
- Hittills (1999)
- You and Me (2000)
- Samling (2009)
- Så mycket Bo Kaspers Orkester (2013)

=== Live albums ===
- Sto-Gbg live-DVD (2004)
- Bo Kaspers Orkester live, Vega Köpenhamn live-DVD (2007)
