= Amerika (album) =

Studio album by Bo Kaspers Orkester
- Released: 1996
- Length: 45:21
- Label: Columbia

Amerika is a Jazz album by Bo Kaspers Orkester, released in 1996 under Sony Music Entertainment. It charted in Sweden (reaching the 3rd position on Albumtopplistan, the albums chart) and in Norway (5th position on the albums chart Amerika was the third album released by the Swedish Pop-Rock band and was recorded at Cosmos Studios.

== Track listing ==
1. "Vi kommer aldrig att dö" – 4:25
2. "En ny skön värld" – 4:20
3. "Ett & noll" – 4:07
4. "Amerika" – 4:26
5. "Lika rädd som du" – 5:39
6. "Kvarter" – 3:18
7. "Är det där vi är nu" – 4:21
8. "En världsomsegling under havet" – 4:49
9. "Du kan" – 4:39
10. "Gott nytt år" – 5:17
