= Amerika, Saxony =

Coordinates: 50°55′56″N 12°43′59″E

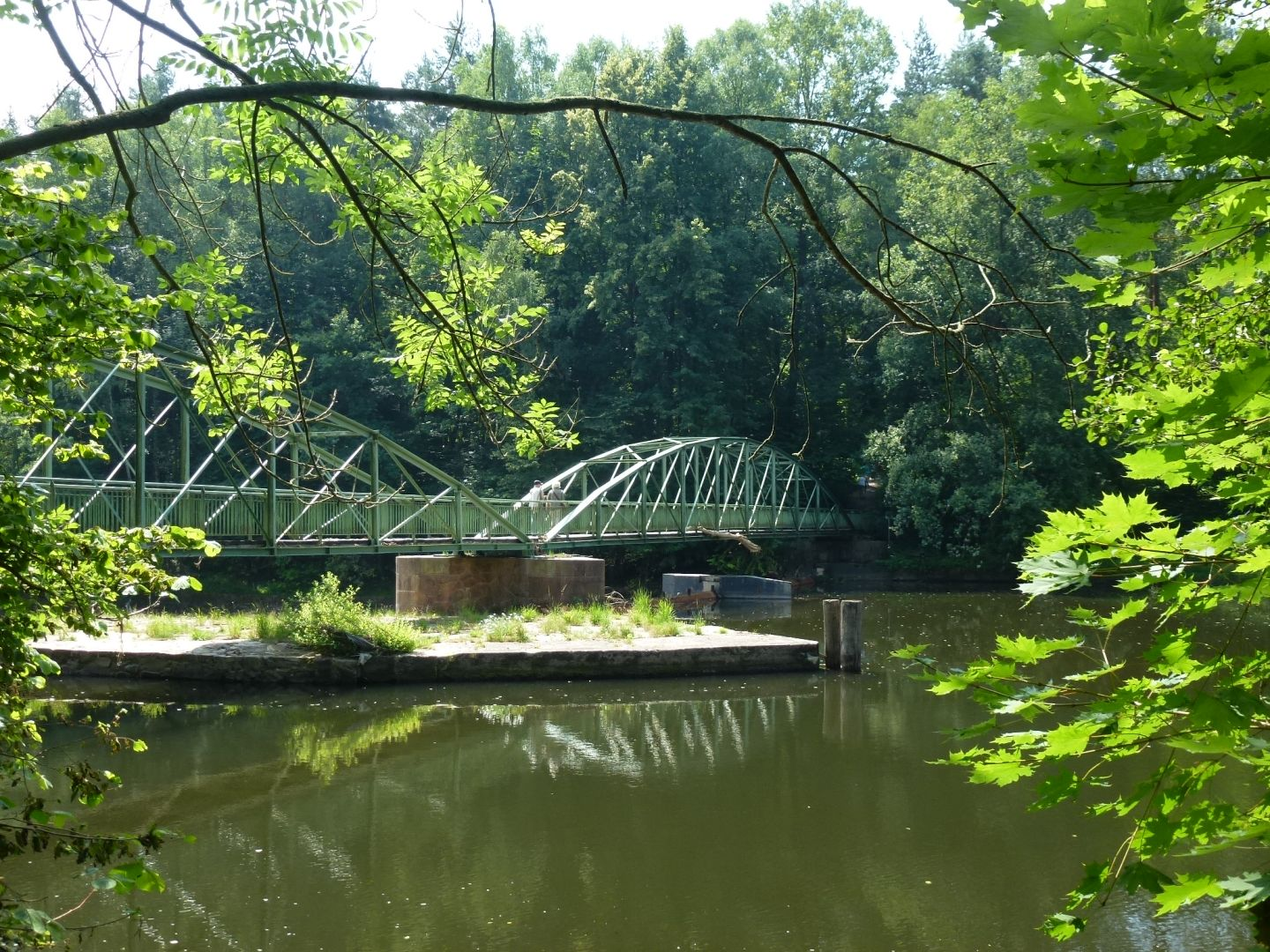
A footbridge in Amerika

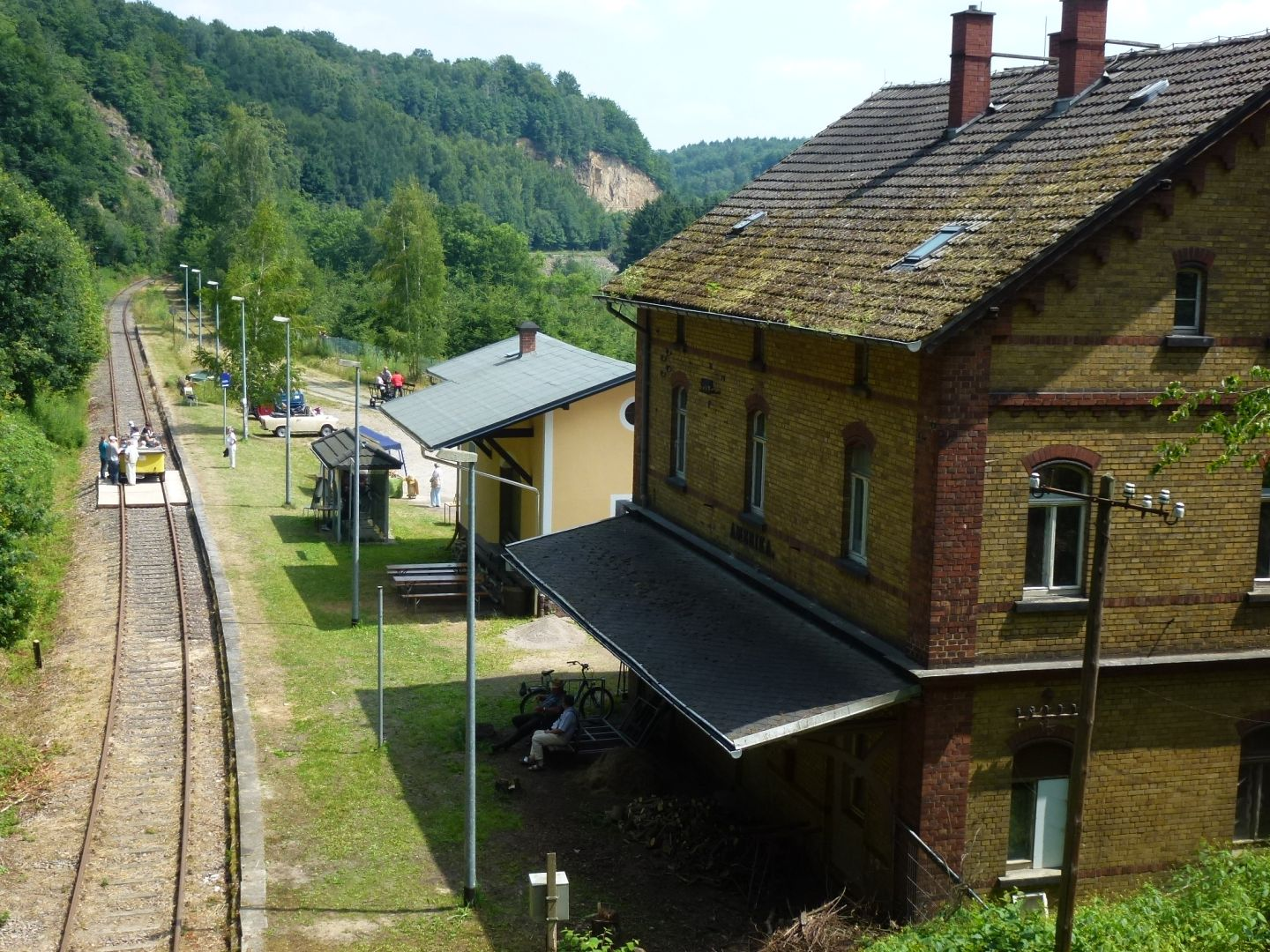
"Schienentrabi" at the station

Amerika (German pronunciation: [aˈmeːʁika]) is a former company settlement in the German state of Saxony and a district of the town of Penig.

A small village of 79 residents (2010), it is known merely for its name, the German word for America, which was given to it in the 19th century. In 1836, a spinning factory was built on the left bank of the river Zwickauer Mulde, but houses for workers and clerks were not built until 1870. Initially, because a bridge was only built much later, workers and visitors coming from the right bank of the river had to cross the water using stepping stones or boats to access the place. As "crossing the pond" in those times was chiefly understood as emigrating to America, the factory was named "Amerika" by the local population. The name became official in 1876 (incidentally, the centennial of the United States of America) when the village's railway station was named "Amerika".

The factory was closed in 1991. Amerika was part of Arnsdorf until 1993 and, together with the latter, became part of Penig in 1994. In 1995, the town of Penig bought the buildings from the Treuhandanstalt, and new trades and a museum (including workshops of locksmiths and file cutters, powered by a refurbished water turbine) have been established since.

== See also ==
- America, Netherlands
