= Ameryka, Opole Voivodeship =

Ameryka
- Village
- Interactive map of Ameryka
- Coordinates: 50.7833°N 17.8667°E
- Country: Poland
- Voivodeship: Opole Voivodeship
- County: Opole
- Gmina: Lubniany

Ameryka [amɛrɨka] is a village in the administrative district of Gmina Lubniany, within Opole County, Opole Voivodeship, in south-western Poland.
