= Varik =

- Village
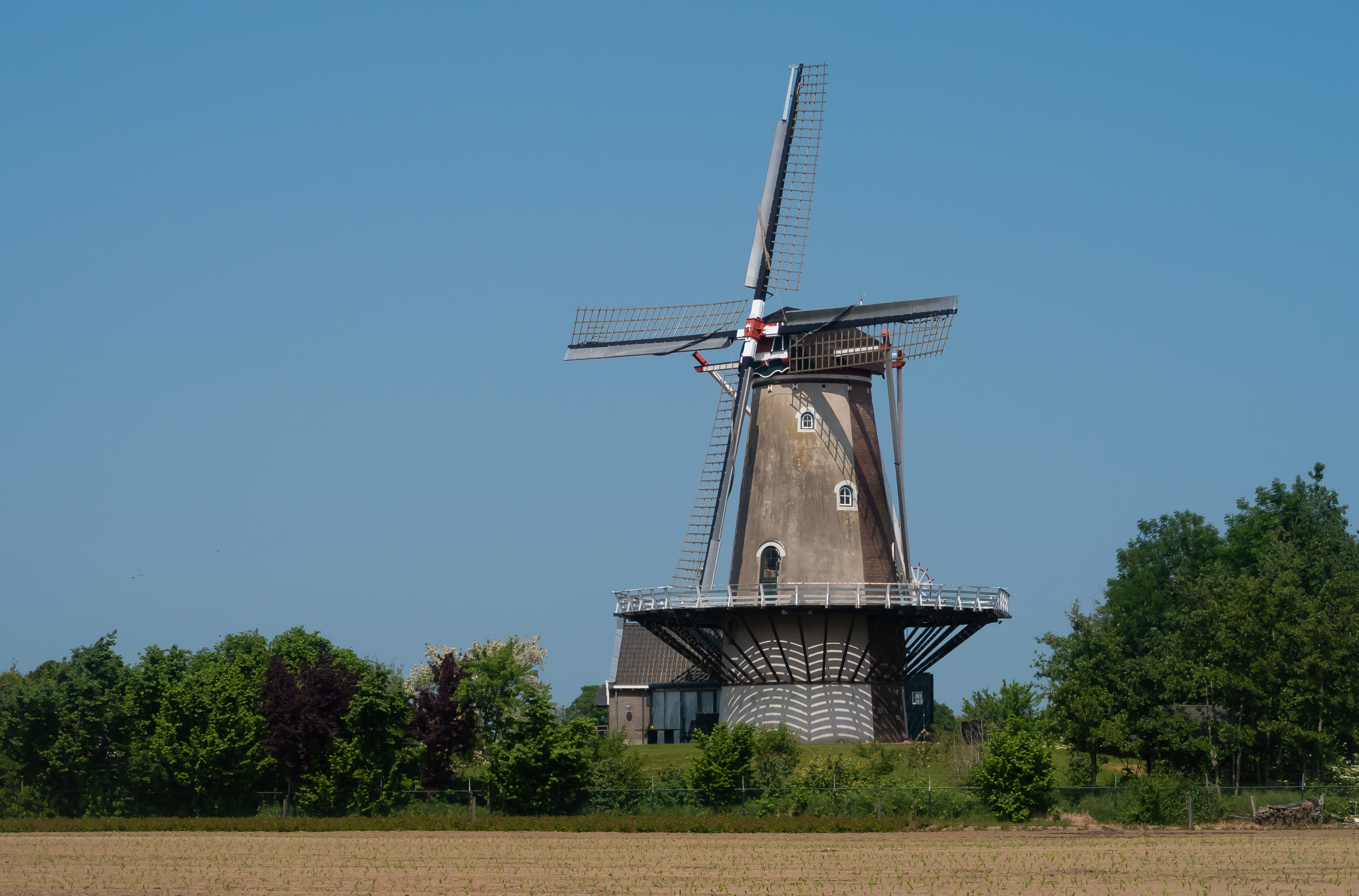
- Varik, windmill: korenmolen de Bol

- Coat of arms

- Location in the Netherlands Varik (Netherlands)
- Coordinates: 51°49′24″N 5°22′9″E
- Country: Netherlands
- Province: Gelderland
- Municipality: West Betuwe

Area
  - Total: 5.53 km^{2} (2.14 sq mi)
- Elevation: 6 m (20 ft)

Population (2021)
  - Total: 1,070
  - Density: 193/km^{2} (501/sq mi)
- Time zone: UTC+1 (CET)
  - Summer (DST): UTC+2 (CEST)
- Postal code: 4064
- Dialing code: 0344

Varik is a village in the Dutch province of Gelderland. It is a part of the municipality of West Betuwe, and lies about 8 km south of Tiel.

Varik was a separate municipality until 1978, when it became a part of Neerijnen.

== History ==
It was first mentioned between 968 and 971 as Feldrike. The etymology is unclear. Varik developed along the Waal River as a stretched out esdorp The tower of the Dutch Reformed Church dates from the 15th century and received its spire in 1844. The church building dates from 1881. The Roman Catholic church was constructed between 1877 and 1879. In 1840, Varik was home to 749 people. The grist mill De Bol was built in1867, and nowadays serves as a residential house.

== Born in Varik ==
- Jan Hendrik van Grootvelt

== Gallery ==
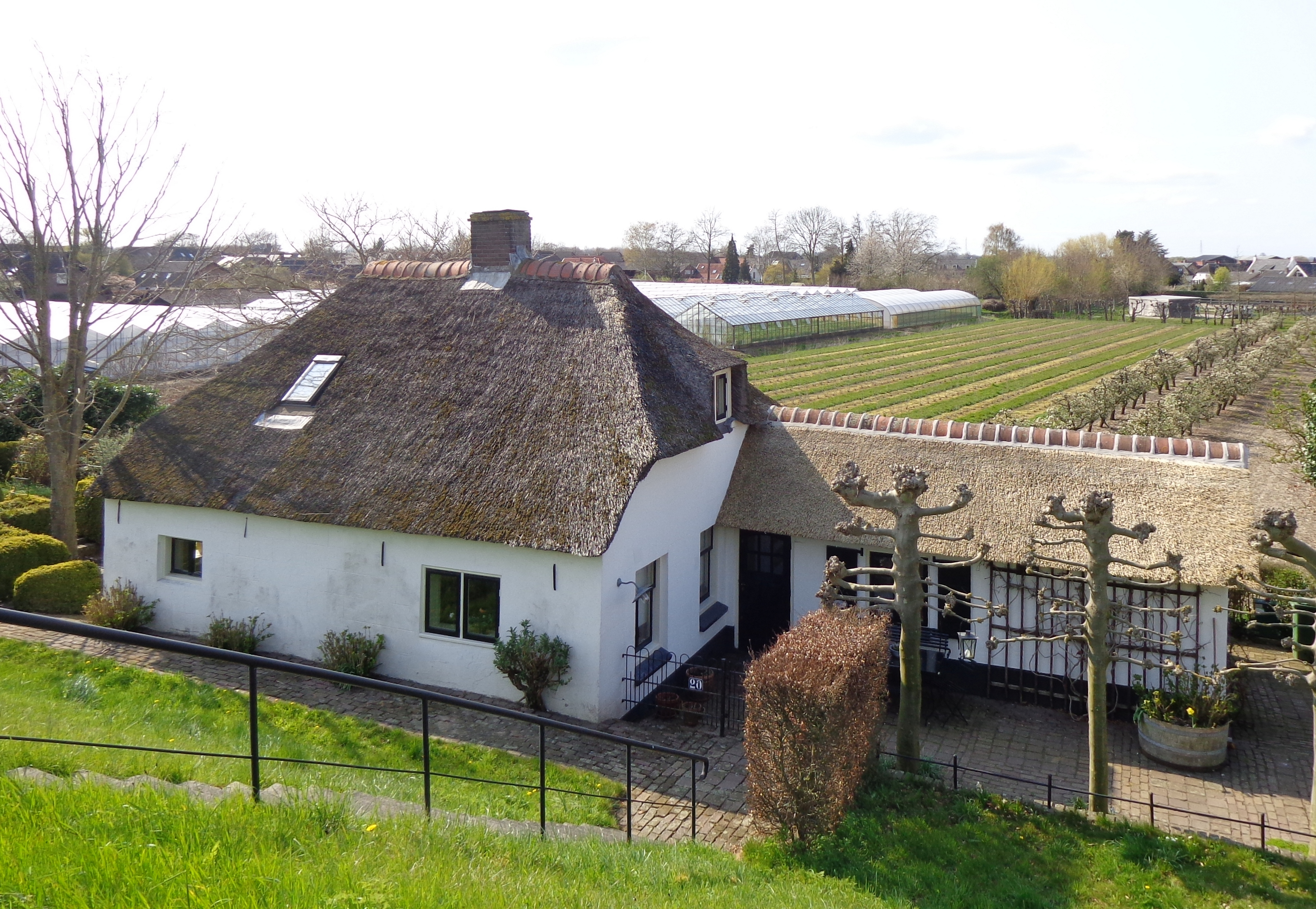
Farm near the dike

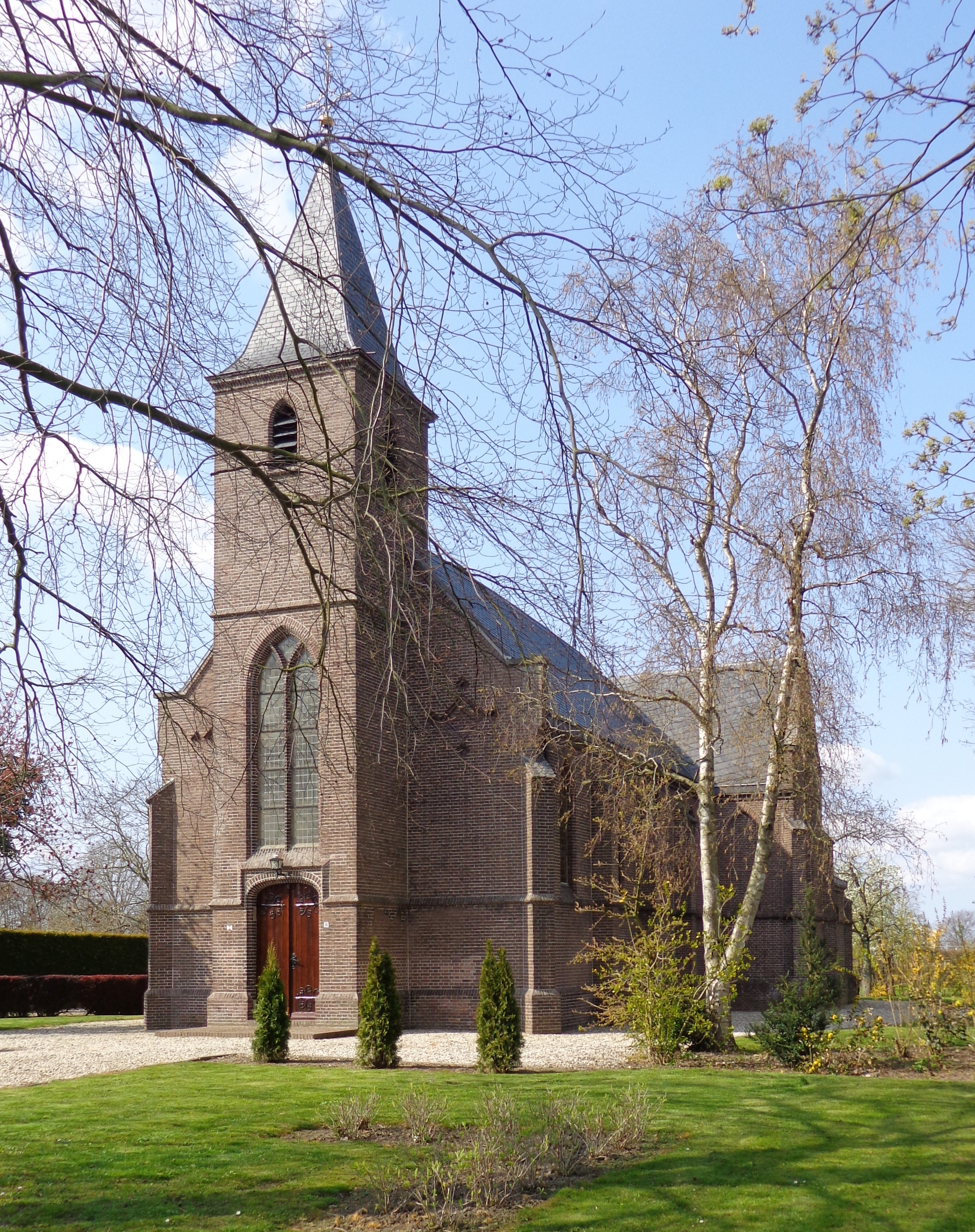
Dutch Reformed Church

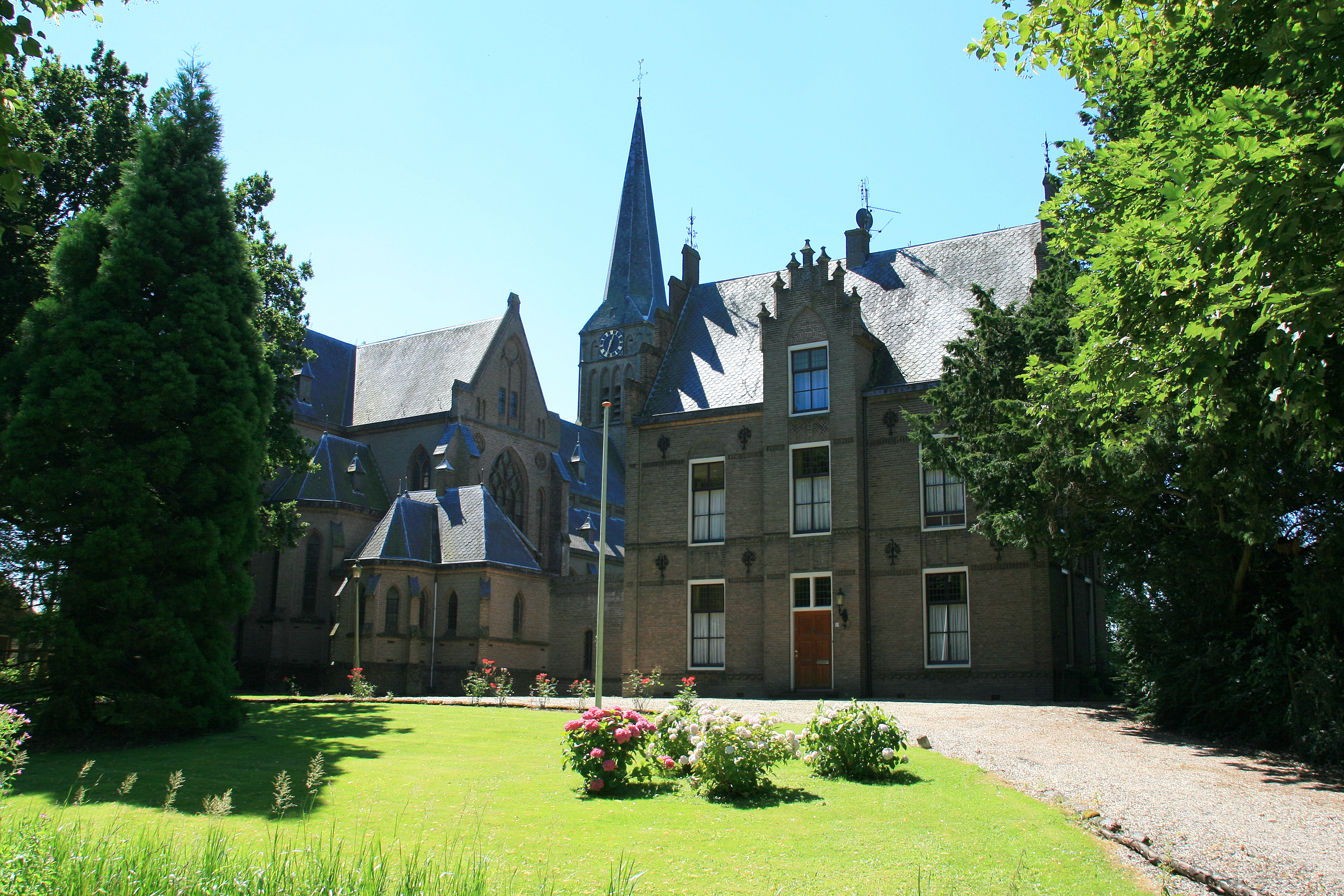
Clergy house

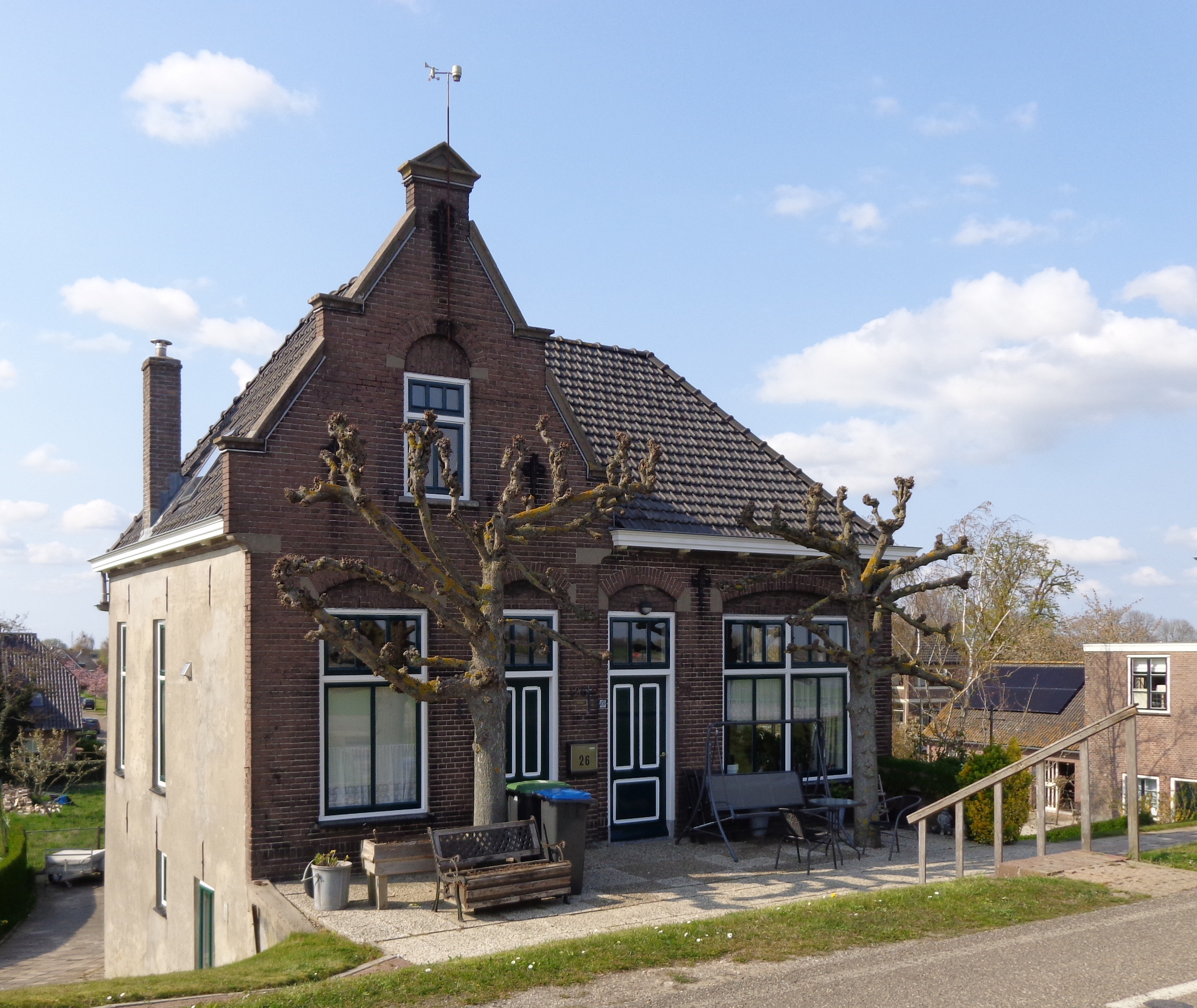
House on the dike
