= Een =

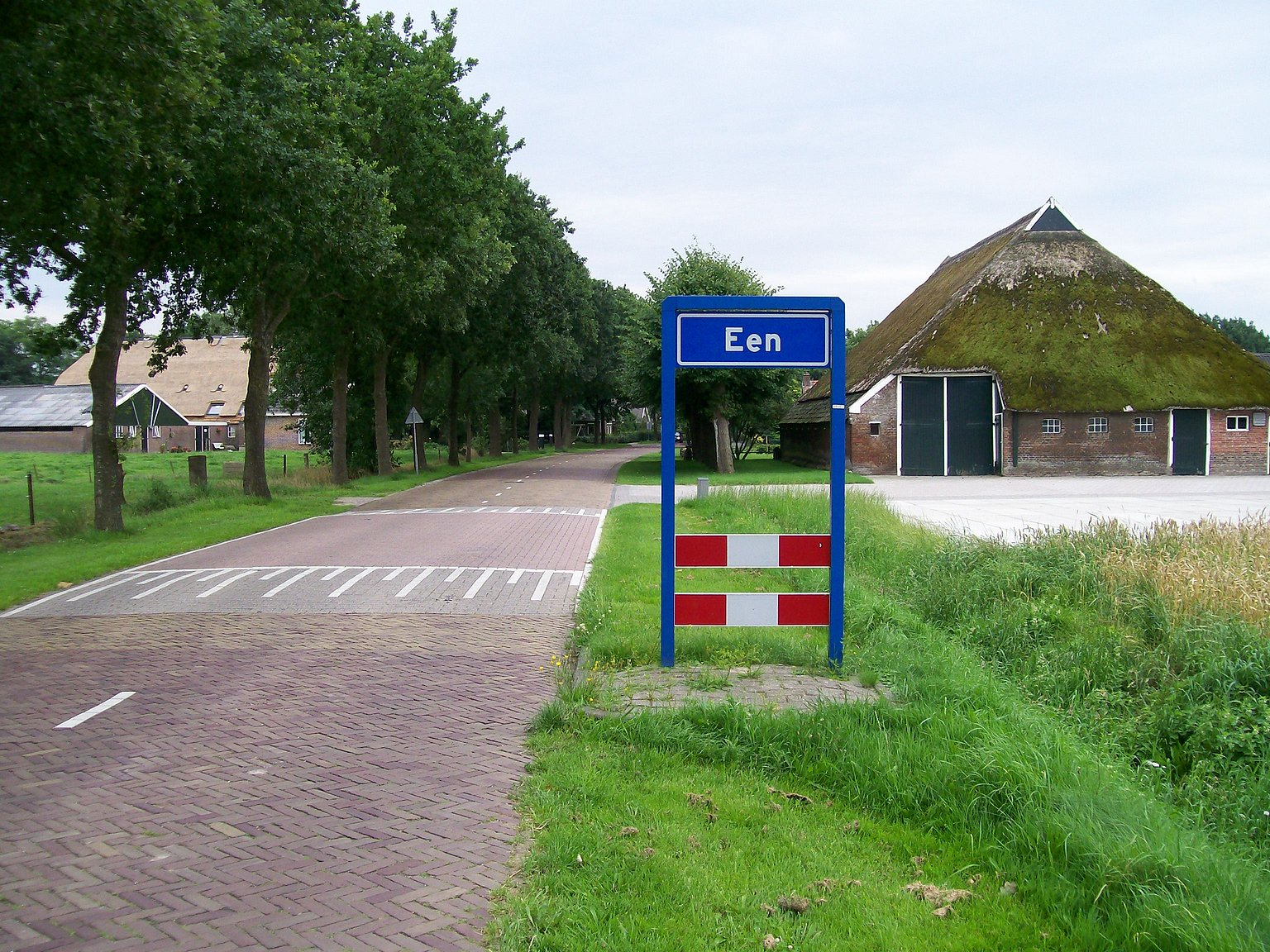
- Main street Een

- Flag

- Location in province of Drenthe in the Netherlands Een (Netherlands)
- Coordinates: 53°4′32″N 6°23′38″E
- Country: Netherlands
- Province: Drenthe
- Municipality: Noordenveld

Area
  - Total: 0.81 km^{2} (0.31 sq mi)
- Elevation: 7 m (23 ft)

Population (2021)
  - Total: 540
  - Density: 670/km^{2} (1,700/sq mi)
- Time zone: UTC+1 (CET)
  - Summer (DST): UTC+2 (CEST)
- Postal code: 9342
- Dialing code: 0592

Een [eːn] is a village in the Netherlands. It is part of the Noordenveld municipality in Drenthe.

== History ==
Een is an esdorp which developed in the middle ages on the higher grounds. The communal pasture is triangular. The village developed during the 19th and early 20th century during the exploration of the peat in the area. In 1840, it was home to 134 people. The earliest church was from 1858, but no longer exists. The Dutch Reformed Church dates from 1913. It used to be a linear settlement, but has developed into a cluster.

Een has become a recreational area with forests and heaths.

== Gallery ==
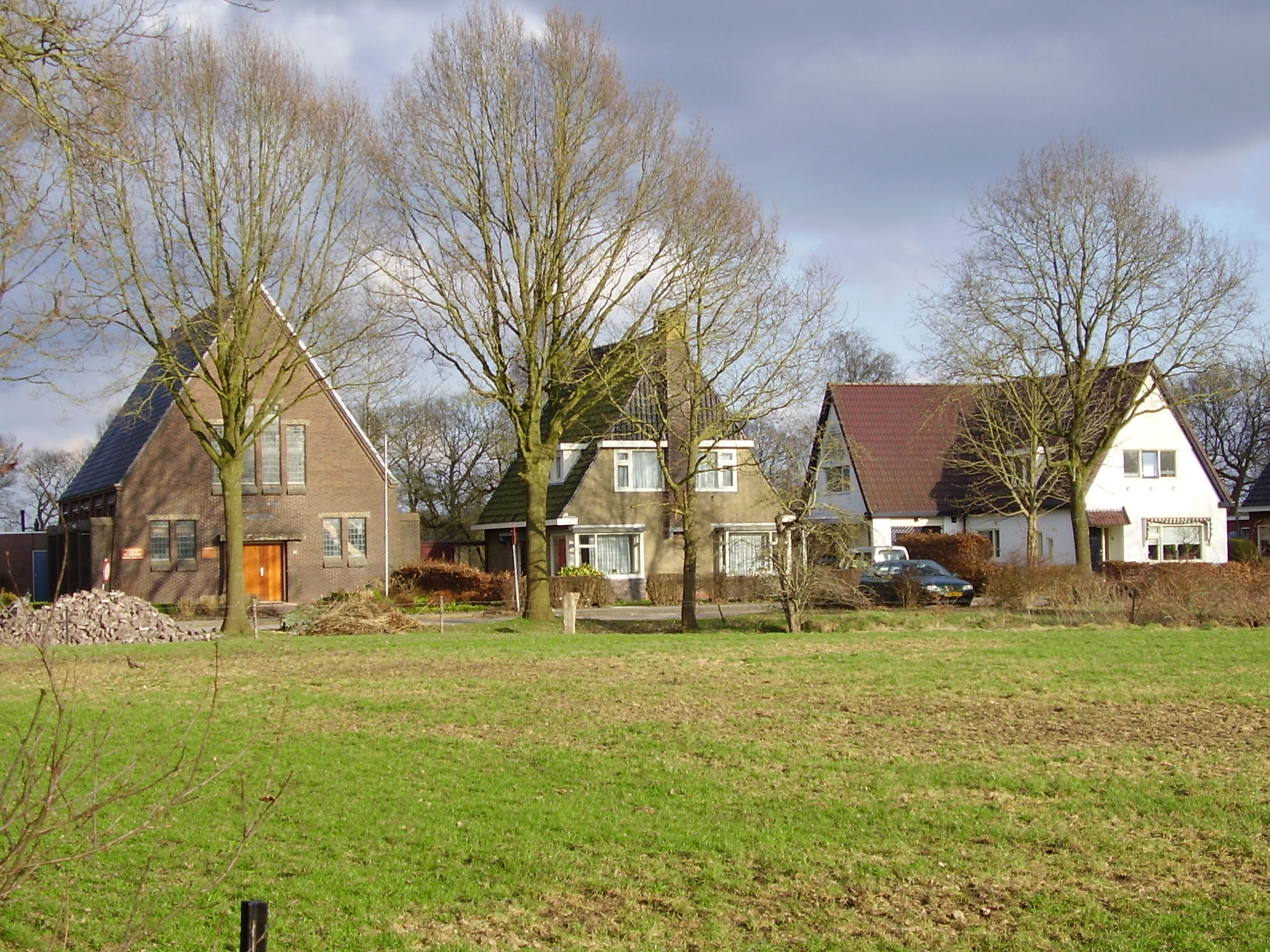
Houses in Een

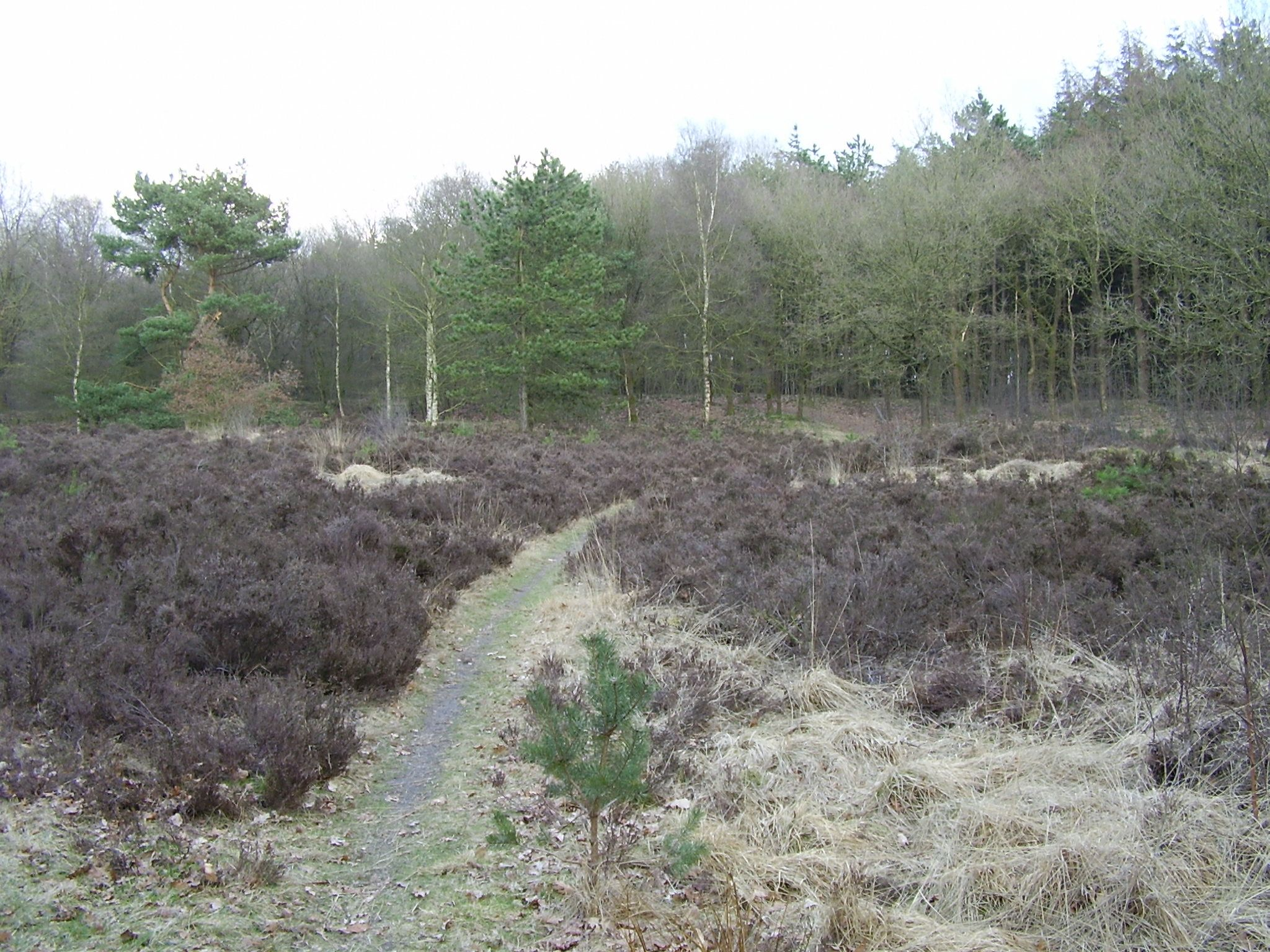
Heath near Een

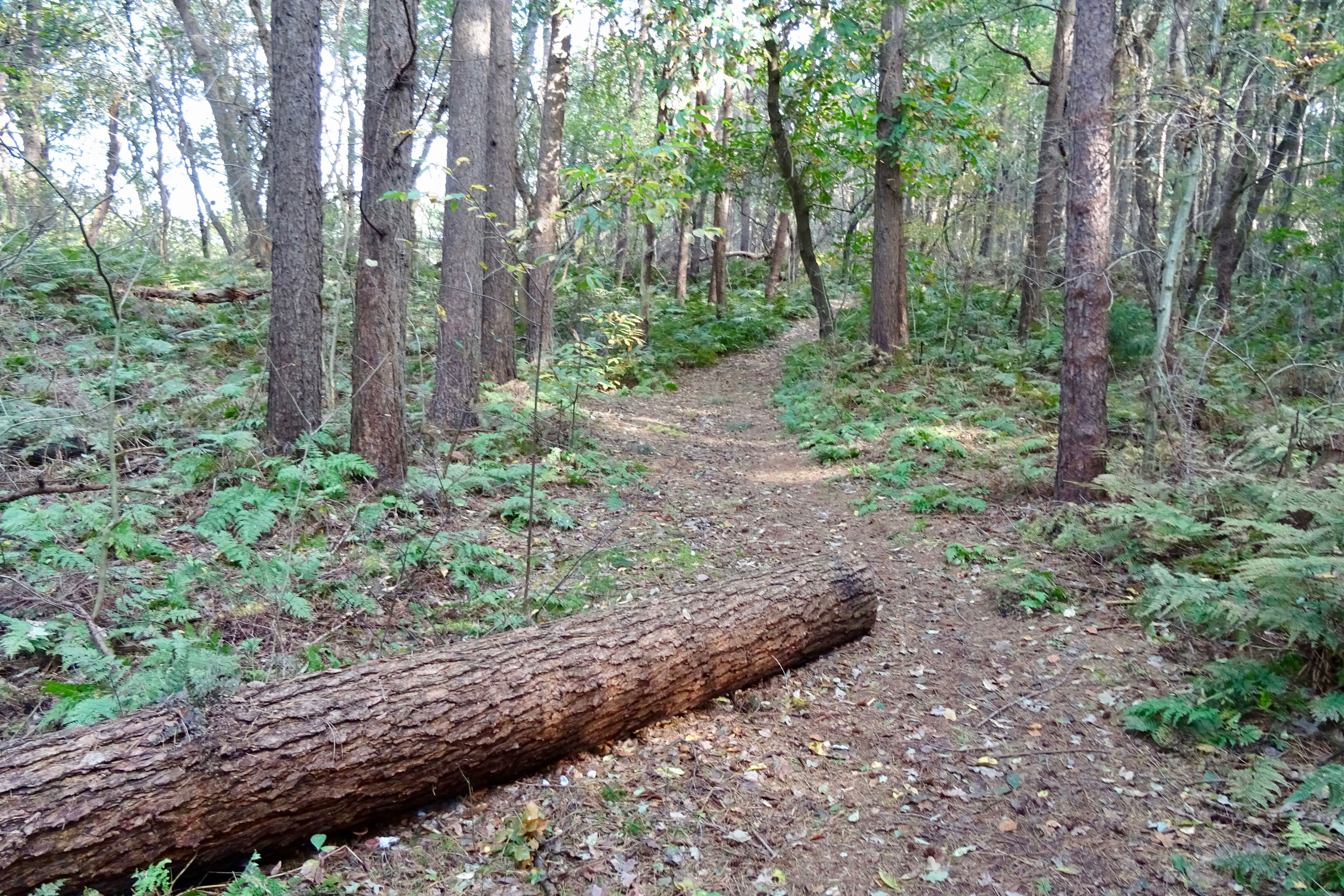
Forest near Een
