= Stiphout =

- Village
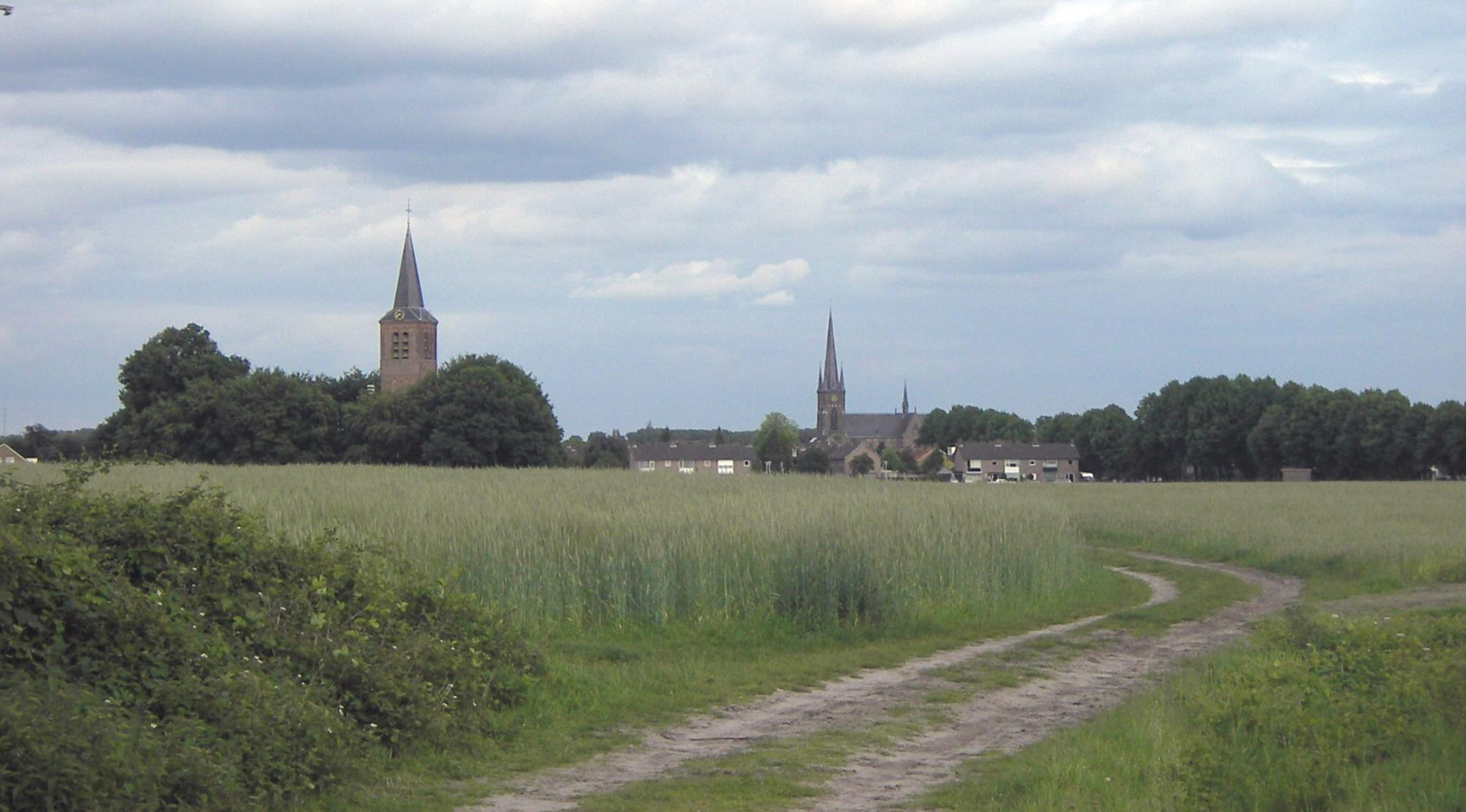
- View on Stiphout

- Location in the province of North Brabant in the Netherlands Stiphout (Netherlands)
- Coordinates: 51°29′9″N 5°37′5″E
- Country: Netherlands
- Province: North Brabant
- Municipality: Helmond

Area
  - Total: 11.06 km^{2} (4.27 sq mi)
- Elevation: 17 m (56 ft)

Population (2021)
  - Total: 5,410
  - Density: 489/km^{2} (1,270/sq mi)
- Time zone: UTC+1 (CET)
  - Summer (DST): UTC+2 (CEST)
- Postal code: 5708
- Dialing code: 0492

Stiphout is a village in the Dutch province of North Brabant. It is located in the municipality of Helmond, about 2 kilometres (1.2 mi) west of the centre of that city. The village is mentioned for the first time in 1155 as 'Villa Stilpot', and in 2005 the village celebrated its 850th anniversary. It is famous for its Bavaria Profronde, an annual festival that attracts 50,000 visitors.

Stiphout was a separate municipality until 1968, when it became part of Helmond. Before that, Stiphout would have been considered a poor village. Now, thanks to its location (between Helmond and Eindhoven), it is populated largely by affluent people seeking a suburban lifestyle.

The spoken language is Peellands (an East Brabantian dialect, which is very similar to colloquial Dutch).

== Sport ==
=== Cycling ===
Chaam organises every year after the Tour de France the Profronde van Stiphout, a cycling criterium for professional cyclists.

== Gallery ==
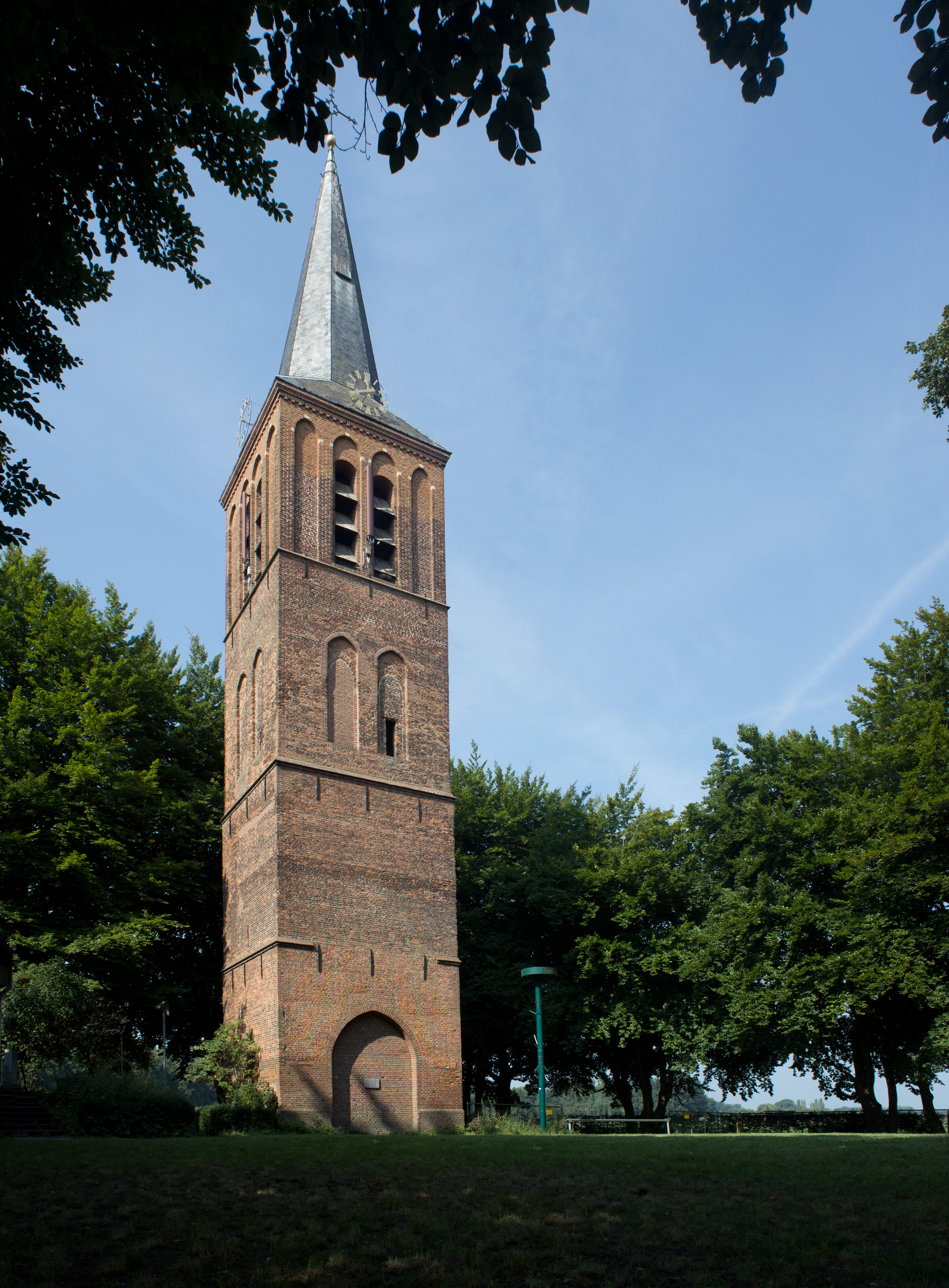
Old tower

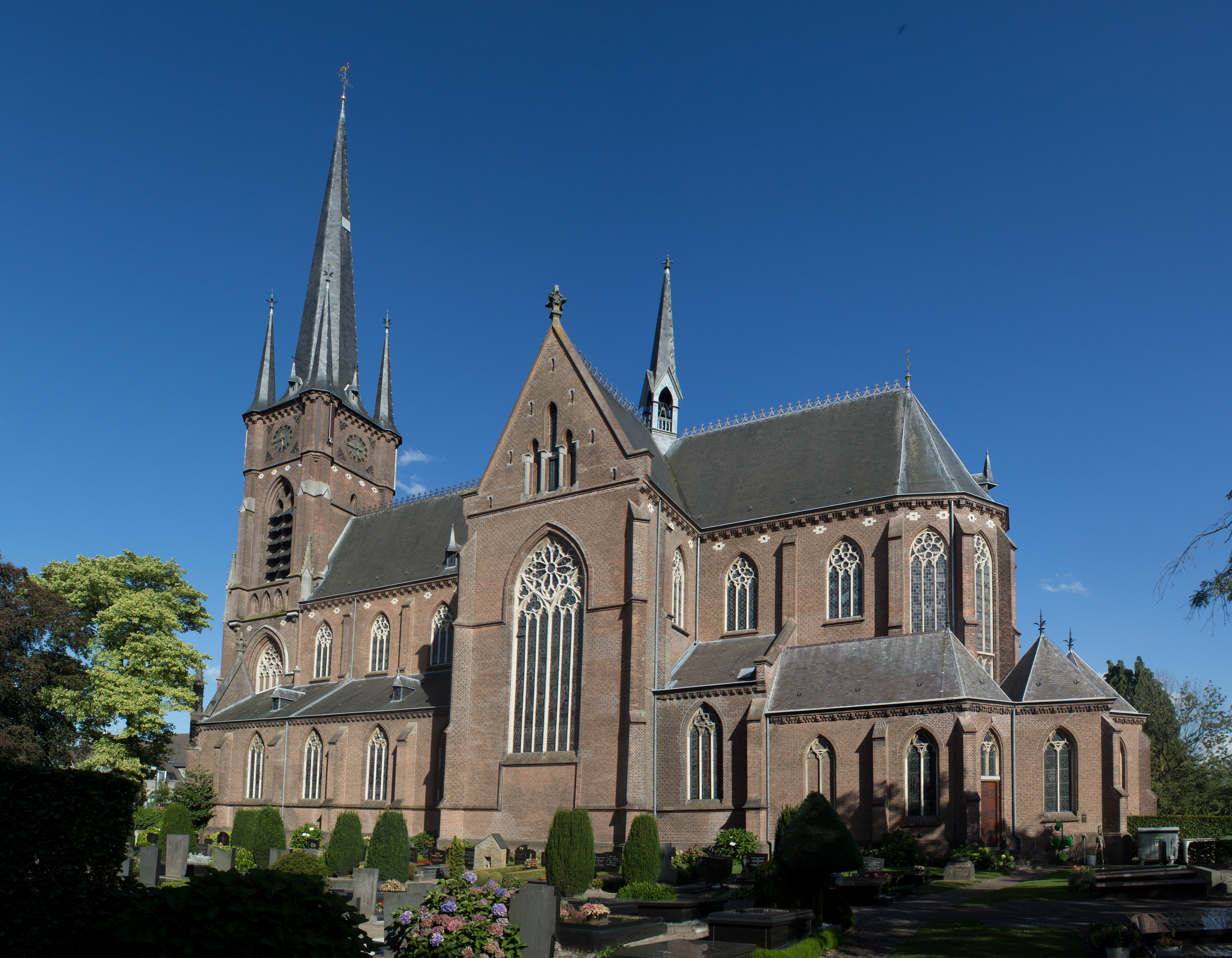
St Trudo Church

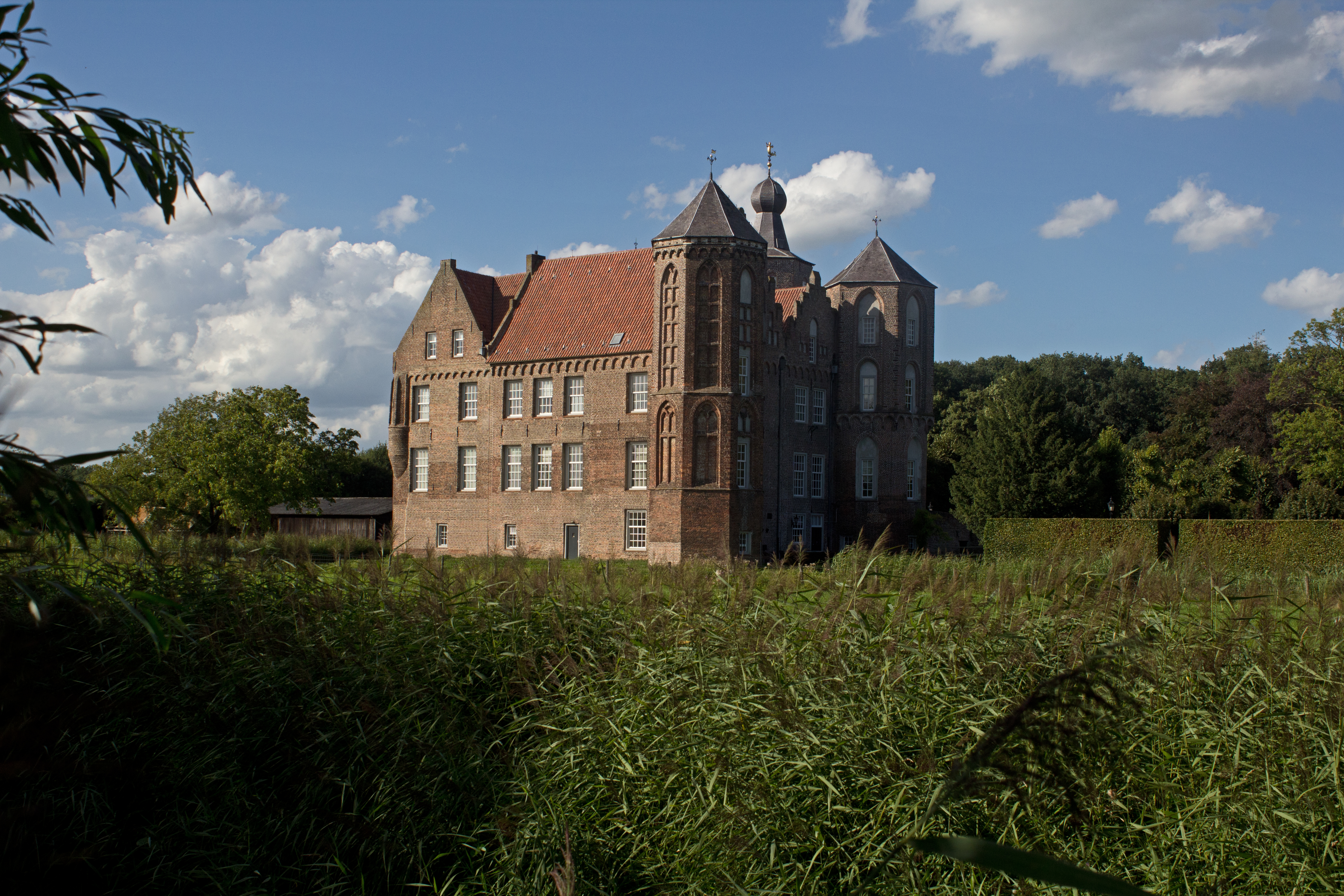
Castle Croy
