= Ameryka, Lublin Voivodeship =

Ameryka
- Village
- Location within Poland
- Coordinates: 50°38′2″N 23°54′43″E
- Country: Poland
- Voivodeship: Lublin
- County: Hrubieszów
- Gmina: Mircze

Ameryka [amɛˈrɨka] is a village in the administrative district of Gmina Mircze, within Hrubieszów County, Lublin Voivodeship, in eastern Poland, close to the border with Ukraine.
