= Breezand =

- Village
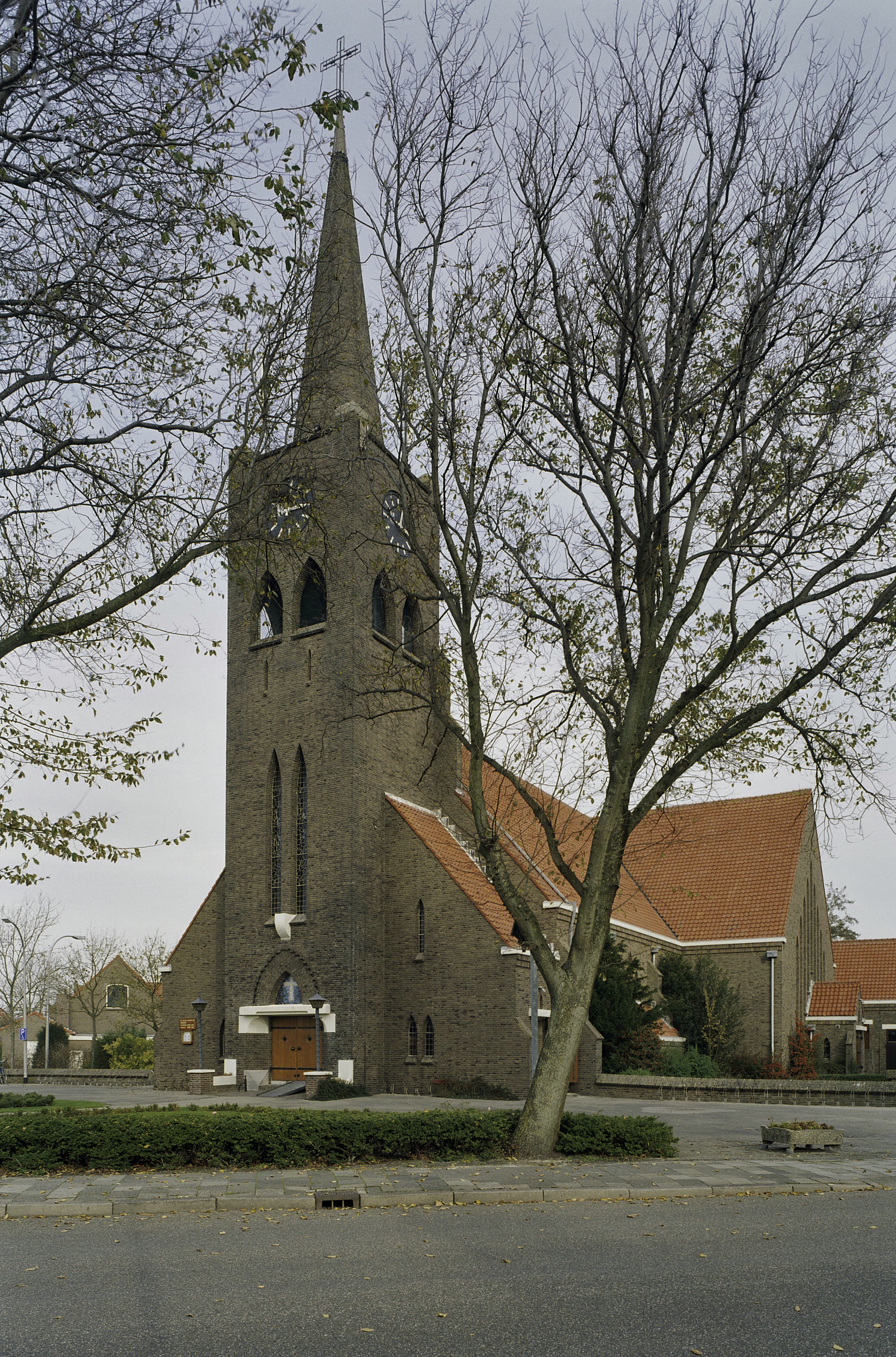

- Location in the Netherlands Location in the province of North Holland in the Netherlands
- Coordinates: 52°53′N 4°48′E
- Country: Netherlands
- Province: North Holland
- Municipality: Hollands Kroon

Area
  - Village: 18.23 km^{2} (7.04 sq mi)
- Elevation: −0.3 m (−0.98 ft)

Population (2025)
  - Village: 3,860
  - Density: 212/km^{2} (548/sq mi)
  - Urban: 2,650
  - Rural: 1,210
- Time zone: UTC+1 (CET)
  - Summer (DST): UTC+2 (CEST)
- Postal code: 1764
- Dialing code: 0223

Breezand is a village in the Dutch province of North Holland. It is a part of the municipality of Hollands Kroon, which is known for its flower bulbs, and lies about 7 km southeast of Den Helder.

== Overview ==
The village was first mentioned in 1665 as Breesant, and means "wide sand" which refers to a former shoal to the north-east of Wieringen. The polder in which Breezand was built, was created in 1847. In 1931, the Catholic St John Evangelist Church was inaugurated. In 1914, a railway station opened on the Amsterdam to Den Helder railway line. It closed in 1938.

== Gallery ==
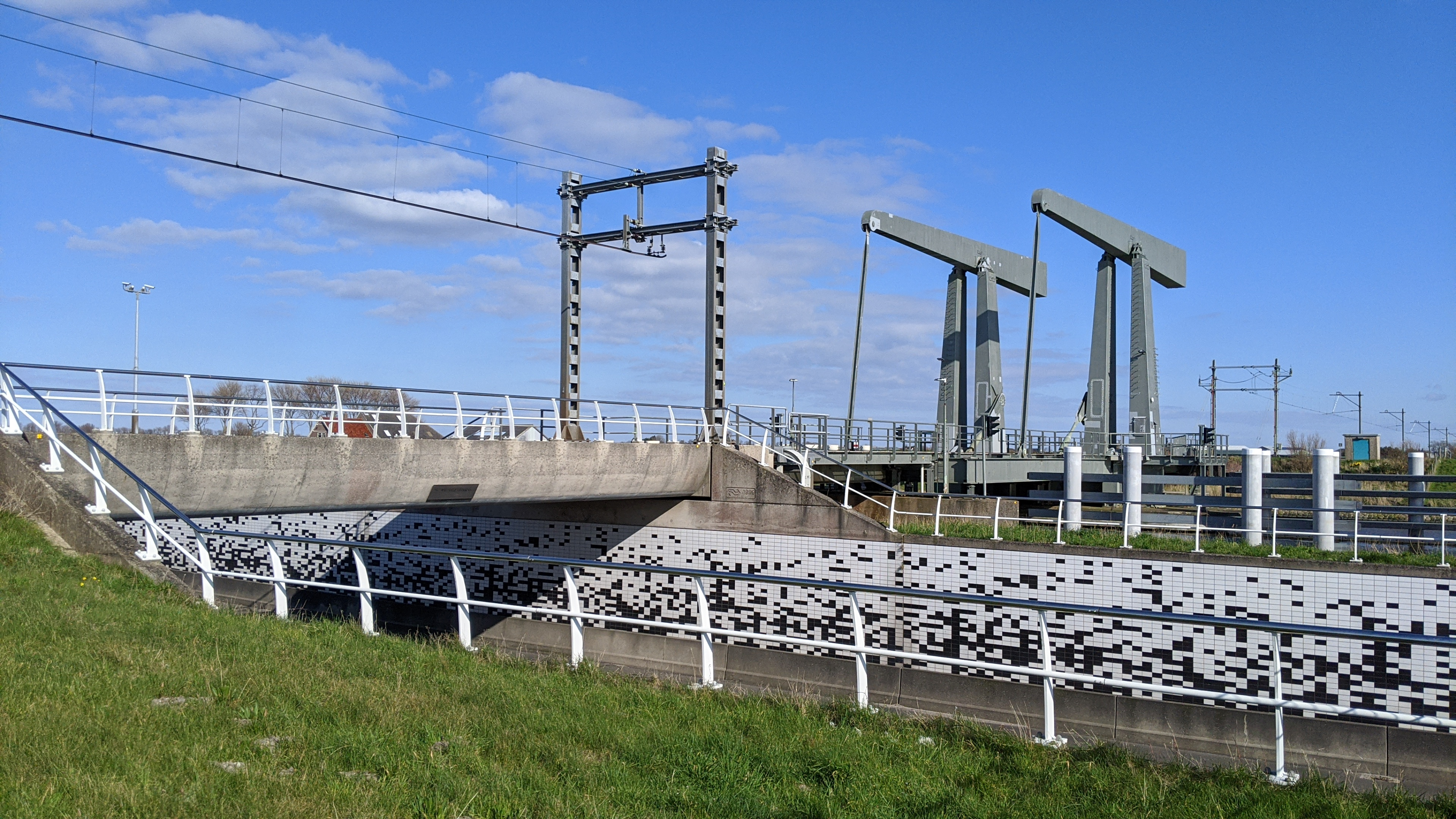
Railway bridge near Breezand

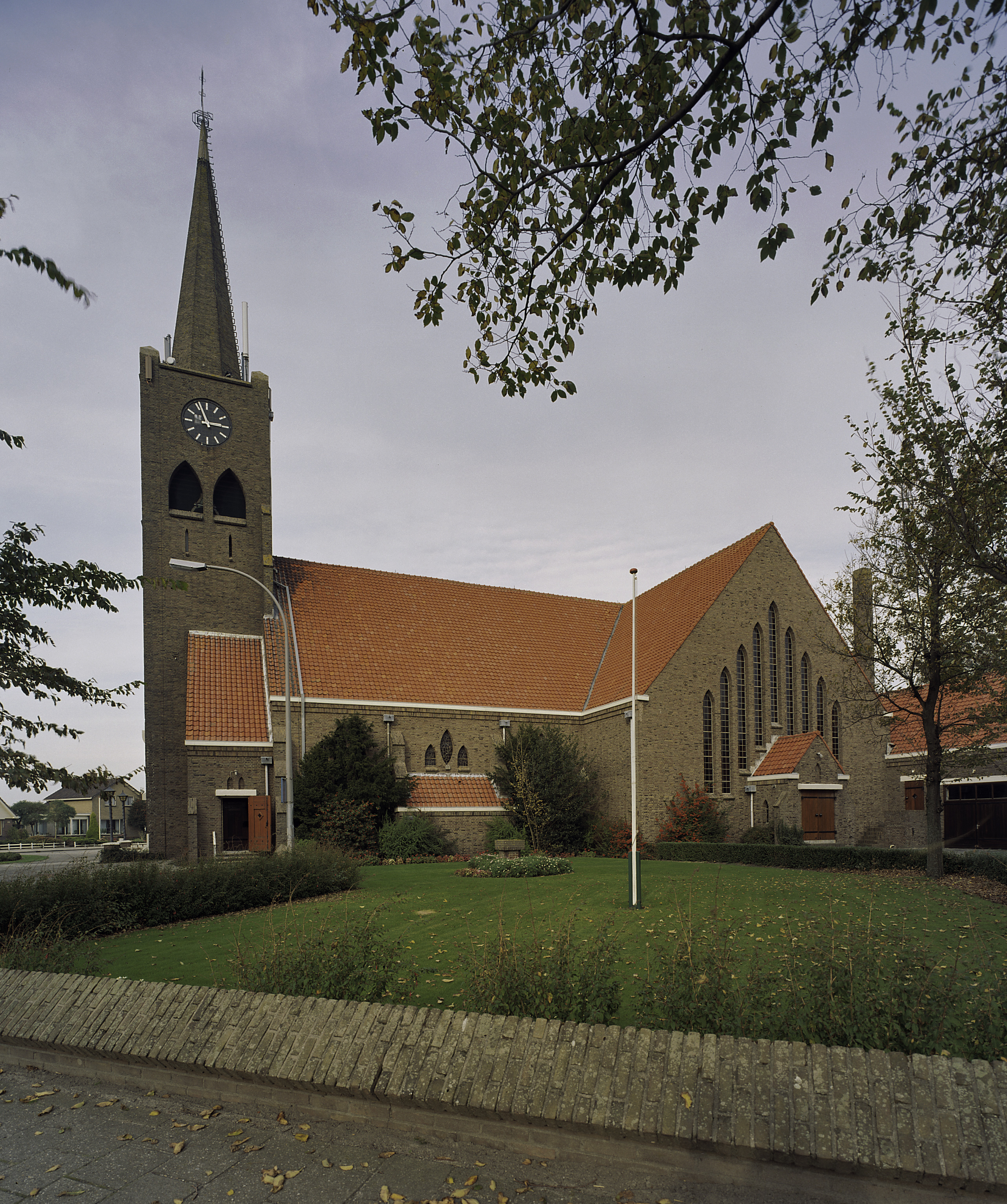
St John Evangelist Church
