= Amerika, Netherlands =

Amerika
- Hamlet
- Location in province of Drenthe in the Netherlands Amerika (Netherlands)
- Coordinates: 53°5′30″N 6°22′15″E
- Country: Netherlands
- Province: Drenthe
- Municipality: Noordenveld
- Elevation: 7 m (23 ft)
- Time zone: UTC+1 (CET)
  - Summer (DST): UTC+2 (CEST)

Amerika is a hamlet in the Netherlands. It is part of the village of Een, in the Noordenveld municipality in Drenthe.

Amerika is not a statistical unit, and does not have town limit signs. It contains about 25 houses, a camping and some bungalow parks. It is a forested area and mainly has a recreational use.

Just north of the hamlet is the recreational ground Ronostrand, a swimming pool in an old sand mine.

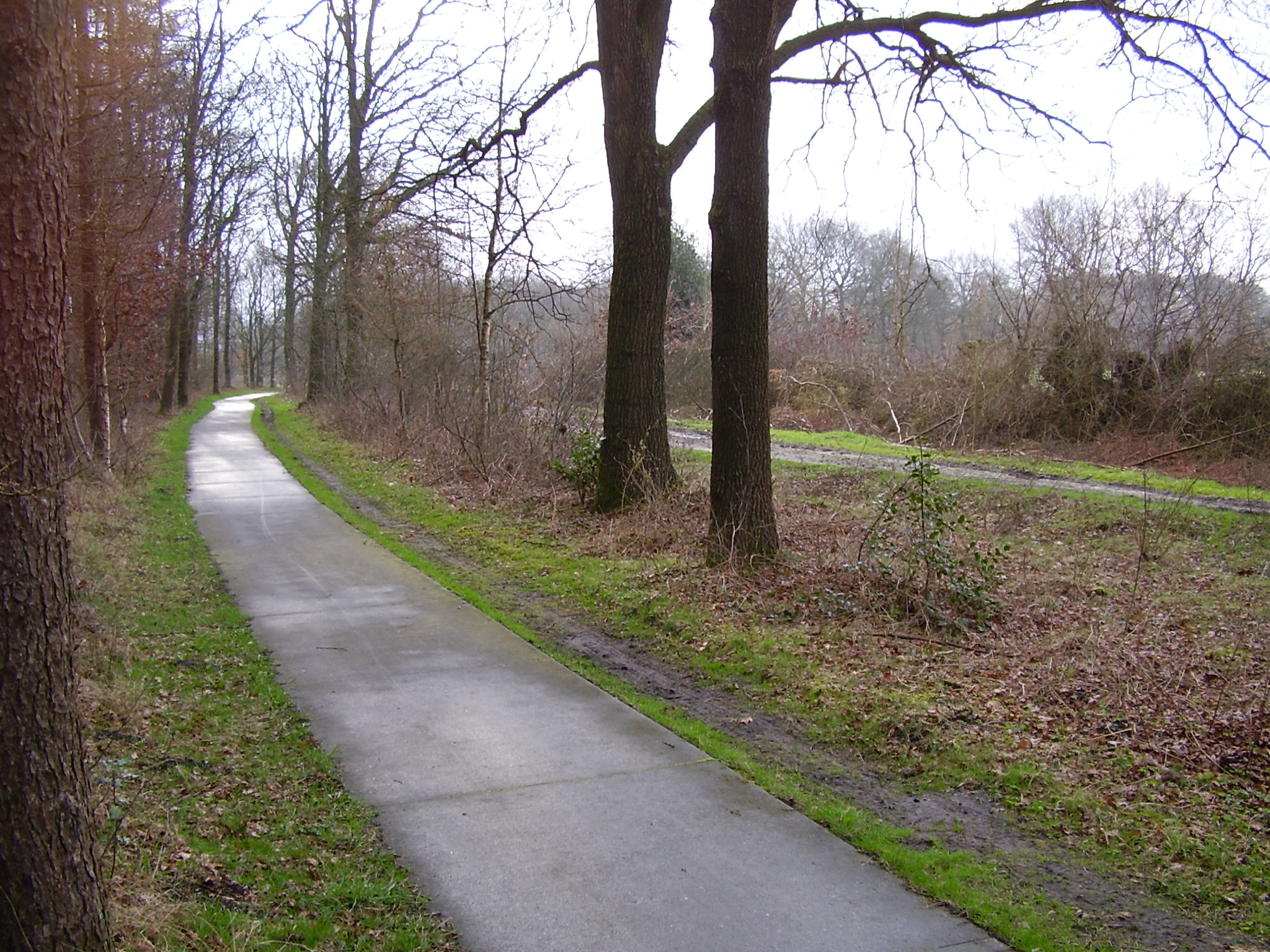
Cycle path from Een to Amerika
