= List of Aria soundtracks =

Aria discography
- Studio albums: 5
- Compilation albums: 2
- Tribute albums: 1
- Singles: 9

Aqua and Aria is a utopian science fantasy manga series written and illustrated by Kozue Amano published between 2001 and 2008 by Enix then by Mag Garden. Set in the early 24th century on a terraformed Mars, now called Aqua, it depicts the life of a young woman named Akari as a trainee gondolier tour guide, or undine. It was adapted by Hal Film Maker as a 54-episode anime television series broadcast between 2005 and 2008, comprising two seasons, an original video animation (OVA), and a third season, all directed by Jun'ichi Satō with music direction by Shigeharu Sasago and Takeshi Senoo. A new OVA, called Aria the Avvenire, was released in the 10th anniversary Blu-Ray Box sets of the anime series between 24 December 2015 and 24 June 2016. The discography of the Aria television series consists of five studio albums, one compilation album, one tribute album, and nine maxi singles.

The core of the discography is the three original soundtrack albums, covering the three anime seasons, produced by Flying Dog/JVC Entertainment and released in 2005, 2006, and 2008, respectively. Most of the music on the soundtrack albums was composed, performed, and arranged by Takeshi Senoo and Choro Club, a Japanese choro band that previously created the music of the anime adaptation of Yokohama Kaidashi Kikou, another futuristic slice of life story. The other two studio albums containing piano versions of music from the soundtrack albums and theme sounds, released in 2006 and 2008, respectively. A vocal compilation album collecting the songs and lyric-less vocal themes from first two anime seasons was released in 2006.

Nine maxi singles were released, seven of them produced by Flying Dog/JVC Entertainment, covering the opening and endings themes of the three anime seasons and the OVA. The remaining two, produced by 5pb. Records, were the opening and ending theme songs of the two video game adaptations. One tribute album was released to mark the passing of Eri Kawai in 2008.

== Soundtracks ==
Several soundtrack albums were released for the anime television series Aria. Most of the releases charted in the Oricon charts, with the highest ranking album being Aria the Natural Vocal Song Collection at 30th, and the highest ranking single being "Euforia", the opening theme for Aria the Natural, at 18th.

=== Aria the Animation singles and album ===
The opening and closing themes of the first anime season, Aria the Animation, were both released as singles on 21 October 2005 under the Victor Entertainment label, and peak ranked 25th and 40th on the Oricon singles chart, respectively. The opening theme single performed by Yui Makino included "Undine" and "Symphony" in both vocal and instrumental versions, with lyrics written by Eri Kawai and Rieko Itou, respectively. The ending theme single performed by Round Table feat. Nino included "Rainbow" and "Just for You" in both vocal and instrumental versions, with lyrics written by Katsutoshi Kitagawa and Rieko Itou, respectively.

The soundtrack for the first season, Aria the Animation Original Soundtrack, was released under Victor Entertainment label on 23 November 2005 and peak ranked 102nd on the Oricon albums chart. Choro Club feat. Takeshi Senoo performed all the tracks except #2, #9, and #25, which were performed by Yui Makino, Eri Kawai, and Round Table, respectively.

The two singles and the albums were re-released on 22 July 2009 by Victor Entertainment.

Aria the Animation OST Japanese Release
No.	Title	Music	Arrangements	Length
1.	"Gondola no Yume" (ゴンドラの夢)	Jouji Sawada	Choro Club	1:45
2.	"Undine: forest mix" (ウンディーネ -forest mix-; Lyrics by Eri Kawai)	Mina Kubota	Mina Kubota	1:40
3.	"Shourou no Patri: Neo Venezia" (鐘楼のバトリ 〜ネオ·ヴィネツィア〜)	Takeshi Senoo	Takeshi Senoo	1:56
4.	"Aqua"	Shigeharu Sasago	Choro Club	2:14
5.	"Natsu Tayori" (夏便り)	Shigeharu Sasago	Choro Club	1:25
6.	"Aqua Alta Hiyori" (アクアアルタ日和)	Shigeharu Sasago	Choro Club	2:12
7.	"Mangetsu no Dolche" (満月のドルチェ)	Takeshi Senoo	Takeshi Senoo	4:07
8.	"Koi to wa Donna Mono?" (恋とはどんなもの?)	Ou Akioka	Choro Club	3:22
9.	"Baracarole" (バルカローレ; Lyrics by Eri Kawai)	Mina Kubota	Mina Kubota	1:48
10.	"Mayoikonda Roji he to" (迷い込んだ路地へと)	Jouji Sawada	Choro Club	1:57
11.	"Gensou Carnival" (幻想カーニバル)	Jouji Sawada	Choro Club	2:08
12.	"Shizuka ni Afureru Namida" (静かにあふれる涙)	Jouji Sawada	Choro Club	2:03
13.	"Todokanu Omoi" (届かぬ想い)	Ou Akioka	Choro Club	3:02
14.	"Gyakuakogi Queen" (逆漕ぎクイーン)	Jouji Sawada	Choro Club	1:50
15.	"Aria"	Shigeharu Sasago	Takeshi Senoo	2:47
16.	"Mizu no Kagami" (水の鏡)	Shigeharu Sasago	Choro Club	4:51
17.	"Adria no Umibe" (アドリアの海辺)	Takeshi Senoo	Choro Club	1:34
18.	"Hoshikage no Gondola" (星影のゴンドラ)	Takeshi Senoo	Takeshi Senoo	2:47
19.	"Orange no Hibi" (オレンジの日々)	Jouji Sawada	Choro Club	3:37
20.	"Tenki Ame" (天気雨)	Takeshi Senoo	Takeshi Senoo	3:24
21.	"Santa Claus no Sora" (サンタクロウスの空)	Takeshi Senoo	Takeshi Senoo	3:58
22.	"Kanki no Machi" (歓喜の街)	Ou Akioka	Choro Club	1:21
23.	"Aqua (reprise)"	Shigeharu Sasago	Choro Club	2:34
24.	"Soshite Fune wa Iku" (そして舟は行く)	Ou Akioka	Choro Club	2:42
25.	"Rainbow (acoustic ver.)" (Lyrics by Katsutoshi Kitagawa)	Katsutoshi Kitagawa	Round Table & Yasushi Sakurai	3:46
Total length:				65:53

=== Aria the Natural singles and album ===
The opening and closing themes of the second anime season, Aria the Natural, were both released as singles on 26 April 2006 under the Victor Entertainment label, and peak ranked 18th and 23rd on the Oricon singles chart, respectively. The opening theme single performed by Yui Makino included "Euforia" and "Amefuri Hana" in both vocal and instrumental versions, with lyrics written by Eri Kawai and Yui Makino, respectively. The ending theme single performed by Round Table feat. Nino included "Natsu Machi" and "Shiosai" in both vocal and instrumental versions, with lyrics written by Katsutoshi Kitagawa and Rieko Itou, respectively.

The soundtrack for the second season, Aria the Natural Original Soundtrack: Due, was released under the Victor Entertainment label on 24 May 2006, and peak ranked 48th on the Oricon albums chart. Choro Club feat. Takeshi Senoo performed all of the tracks except #2, #13, and #24, which were performed by Yui Makino, Eri Kawai, and Round Table, respectively. "Due" is Italian for "two."

The two singles and the albums were re-released on 22 July 2009 by Victor Entertainment.

Aria the Natural Japanese Release
No.	Title	Music	Arrangements	Length
1.	"Neo Venezia no Suisaiga" (ネオ·ヴェネツィアの水彩画)	Shigeharu Sasago	Choro Club	1:43
2.	"Euforia (TV Size)" (ユーフォリア -TVサイズ-; Lyrics by Eri Kawai)	Mina Kubota	Mina Kubota	1:41
3.	"Natsu no Yousei" (夏の妖精)	Shigeharu Sasago	Choro Club	2:19
4.	"Unga wa Meguru" (運河はめぐる)	Ou Akioka	Choro Club	2:27
5.	"Santa Claus no Sora he: Riverside Christmas Mix" (サンタクロウスの空 ~Riverside Christmas Mix~)	Takeshi Senoo	Choro Club/Takeshi Senoo	2:51
6.	"Nyuudougumo no Shita de" (入道雲の下で)	Shigeharu Sasago	Choro Club	4:13
7.	"Ajisai no Shoukei" (アジサイの小径)	Takeshi Senoo/PAXQUE	Takeshi Senoo	2:33
8.	"Hoshi Made Tsudzuku Omoi" (星まで続く想い)	Shigeharu Sasago	Choro Club	2:48
9.	"Kodomo no Jikan" (子供の時間)	Jouji Sawada	Choro Club	2:24
10.	"Okashi na Futari" (おかしなふたり)	Ou Akioka	Choro Club	1:41
11.	"Itsuka Kita Michi" (いつか来た道)	Takeshi Senoo	Takeshi Senoo	2:54
12.	"Kakaribi no Nocturne" (篝火のノクターン)	Takeshi Senoo	Takeshi Senoo	3:00
13.	"Coccolo (Organ Ver.)" (コッコロ -オルガンVer.-; Lyrics by Eri Kawai)	Mina Kubota	Mina Kubota	2:17
14.	"Aria no Yuuutsu" (アリアの憂鬱)	Ou Akioka	Choro Club	2:02
15.	"Haru Ichiban" (春一番)	Ou Akioka	Choro Club	1:10
16.	"Kettsy no Koushin" (ケットシーの行進)	Ou Akioka	Ou Akioka	1:32
17.	"Samba de Aqua"	Shigeharu Sasago	Choro Club	2:11
18.	"Tooi Kobune" (遠い小舟)	Shigeharu Sasago	Choro Club	3:04
19.	"Rakuyou" (落陽)	Takeshi Senoo	Takeshi Senoo	3:28
20.	"Hana Hie" (花冷え)	Jouji Sawada	Choro Club	2:52
21.	"Toori Ame ga Yandara" (通り雨がやんだら)	Ou Akioka	Choro Club	2:43
22.	"Second Season: Deai" (Second Season〜出会い〜)	Takeshi Senoo	Takeshi Senoo	1:59
23.	"Yuunagi" (夕凪)	Shigeharu Sasago	Choro Club	2:53
24.	"Natsu Machi" (夏待ち -TVサイズ-; Lyrics by Katsutoshi Kitagawa)	Katsutoshi Kitagawa	Round Table/Yasushi Sakurai	1:36
25.	"Aqua -Guide Solo-"	Shigeharu Sasago	Shigeharu Sasago	1:36
Total length:				60:57

=== Aria Piano Collection: Stagione ===
An album of piano music titled Aria Piano Collection: Stagione label was released on 2 August 2006 under the Victor Entertainment label, and peak ranked 115th on the Oricon albums chart. It had piano versions of music from the first two seasons of Aria, with a focus on different seasons of a year on Aqua, performed by Takeshi Senoo and Mina Kubota. Piano tracks are interspersed by "Stagione" tracks which are comments from the voice actors reprising their roles from the anime adaptation. "Stagione" is Italian for "season".

The album was re-released on 22 July 2009 by Victor Entertainment.

Aria Piano Collection: Stagione Japanese Release
No.	Title	Music	Performer	Length
1.	"Stagione: Joshou" (スタジオーネ-序章-)		Erino Hazuki as Akari Mizunashi	0:25
2.	"Euforia" (ユーフォリア)	Mina Kubota	Mina Kubota	2:20
3.	"Stagione: Haru" (スタジオーネ-春-)		Erino Hazuki as Akari Mizunashi	0:50
4.	"Aqua"	Shigeharu Sasago	Takeshi Senoo	2:23
5.	"Hanabie" (花冷え)	Jouji Sawada	Takeshi Senoo	2:25
6.	"Natsu Machi" (夏待ち)	Katsutoshi Kitagawa	Mina Kubota	2:22
7.	"Stagione: Natsu" (スタジオーネ-夏-)		Ryō Hirohashi as Alice Carroll	1:01
8.	"Tooi Kobune" (遠い小舟)	Shigeharu Sasago	Takeshi Senoo	2:45
9.	"Smile Again"	Takeshi Senoo	Takeshi Senoo	2:49
10.	"Stagione: Aki" (スタジオーネ-秋-)		Chiwa Saitō as Aika S. Granzchesta	0:39
11.	"Koi to wa Donna Mono?" (恋とはどんなもの?)	Ou Akioka	Takeshi Senoo	2:32
12.	"Undine" (ウンディーネ)	Mina Kubota	Mina Kubota	2:03
13.	"Stagione: Fuyu" (スタジオーネ-冬-)		Sayaka Ohara as Alicia Florence	0:46
14.	"Shourou no Patori: Neo Venezia" (鐘楼のパトリ〜ネオ ヴェネチア〜)	Takeshi Senoo	Takeshi Senoo	2:26
15.	"Santa Claus no Sora" (サンタクロウスの空)	Takeshi Senoo	Takeshi Senoo	3:42
16.	"Soshite Fune wa Iku (Short Ver.)" (そして舟は行く-Short Ver.-)	Takeshi Senoo	Takeshi Senoo	2:26
17.	"Stagione: Shuushou" (スタジオーネ-終章-)		Erino Hazuki, Ryō Hirohashi, Chiwa Saitō and Sayaka Ohara as their respective roles	0:27
18.	"Rainbow"	Katsutoshi Kitagawa	Mina Kubota	3:05
Total length:				36:03

=== Aria the Natural Vocal Song Collection ===
An album, compilation of vocal music titled Aria the Natural Vocal Song Collection was released on 6 September 2006 under the Victor Entertainment label, and peak ranked 30th on the Oricon albums chart. It compiled songs and vocals themes from the two first seasons, new versions of previously released ones, and an original composition with Erino Hazuki, Ryō Hirohashi, and Chiwa Saitō reprising their roles from the anime adaptation as main performers.

Aria the Natural Vocal Song Collection Japanese Release
No.	Title	Lyrics	Music	Performer	Length
1.	"Barcarole: a cappella" (バルカローレ 〜a cappella〜)	Eri Kawai	Mina Kubota	Eri Kawai	1:46
2.	"Undine: Hikigatari" (ウンディーネ〜弾き語り〜)	Eri Kawai	Mina Kubota	Yui Makino	2:37
3.	"Symphony" (シンフォニー)	Rieko Itou	Katsutoshi Kitagawa	Yui Makino	5:15
4.	"Rainbow"	Katsutoshi Kitagawa	Katsutoshi Kitagawa	ROUND TABLE feat. Nino	3:46
5.	"Mangetsu no Dolce" (満月のドルチェ)		Takeshi Senoo	Eri Kawai	4:02
6.	"Amefuribana" (雨降花)	Yui Makino	F. Giraud	Yui Makino	5:50
7.	"Kami to Hairpin to Watashi" (髪とヘアピンと私)	Takahashi Mai	F. Giraud	Chiwa Saitō	4:42
8.	"Second Season: Kibou" (Second Season 〜希望〜)		Takeshi Senoo	Eri Kawai	2:28
9.	"Natsu Machi" (夏待ち)	Katsutoshi Kitagawa	Katsutoshi Kitagawa	ROUND TABLE feat. Nino	5:43
10.	"Coccolo" (コッコロ)	Eri Kawai	Mina Kubota	Eri Kawai	2:18
11.	"Euforia: Hikigatari" (ユーフォリア 〜弾き語り〜)	Eri Kawai	Mina Kubota	Yui Makino	2:12
12.	"Smile Again"	Takeshi Senoo	Takeshi Senoo	Erino Hazuki	3:42
13.	"Dekkai Shiawase Desu." (でっかいシアワセです。)	Naoki Nishi	Tomofumi Suzuki	Erino Hazuki, Ryō Hirohashi & Chiwa Saitō	6:17
Total length:					51:07

=== Aria the Natural: Tooi Yume no Mirage OP & ED Single ===
A single of the opening and ending themes of the visual novel Aria The Natural: Tooi Yume no Mirage was released 6 October 2006 under the Geneon Entertainment label, and peak ranked 74th on the Oricon singles chart. It included vocal and instrumental versions of "Blue Blue Wave" and "Sono Chiisana Chiisana Hohoemi de" performed by Kaori, with music and lyrics by Chiyomaru Shikura for both songs.

Japanese Release
No.	Title	Arrangements	Length
1.	"Blue Blue Wave"	Toshimichi Isoe	4:31
2.	"Sono Chiisana Chiisana Hohoemi de" (その小さな微笑で)	Kouji Ueno	5:36
3.	"Blue Blue Wave (Instrumental)"	Toshimichi Isoe	4:31
4.	"Sono Chiisana Chiisana Hohoemi de (Instrumental)"	Kouji Ueno	5:35
Total length:			20:19

=== Aria the OVA: Arietta OP & ED Single ===
A single of the opening and ending themes of Aria the OVA: Arietta was released 21 September 2007 under the Victor Entertainment label, and peak ranked 35th on the Oricon singles chart. It included "Nana iro no Sora o" performed by Sonorous and "Ashita, Yūgure Made" performed by Erino Hazuki, both in vocal and instrumental versions, with lyrics by Sonorous and Rieko Itou, respectively.

Japanese Release
No.	Title	Music	Arrangements	Length
1.	"Nana iro no Sora o" (七色の空を; Lyrics by Sonorous)	Sonorous	Choro Club	6:49
2.	"Ashita, Yūgure Made" (明日、夕暮れまで; Lyrics by Rieko Itou)	Katsutoshi Kitagawa	Katsutoshi Kitagawa	6:21
3.	"Nana iro no Sora o (Instrumental)"	Sonorous	Choro Club	6:49
4.	"Ashita, Yūgure Made (Instrumental)"	Katsutoshi Kitagawa	Katsutoshi Kitagawa	6:21
5.	"Nana iro no Sora o: Hikigatari"	Sonorous		6:30
Total length:				33:15

=== Aria the Origination singles and album ===
The opening and closing themes of the third anime season, Aria the Origination, were both released as singles under the Victor Entertainment label on 23 January 2008, and peak ranked 20th and 26th on the Oricon singles chart, respectively. The opening theme single performed by Yui Makino included "Spirale" and "Yokogao (acoustic version)" in both vocal and instrumental versions, with lyrics by Eri Kawai and Rieko Itou, respectively. The ending theme single performed by Akino Arai included "Kin no Nami Sen no Nami" and "Torikago no Yume" in both vocal and instrumental versions, with lyrics by Akino Arai.

The soundtrack for the third season, Aria the Origination Original Soundtrack: Tre, was released under the Victor Entertainment label on 20 February 2008, and peak ranked 49th on the Oricon albums chart. Choro Club feat. Takeshi Senoo performed all of the tracks except numbers 1, 2, 14, 21, and 22, which were performed by Sonorous (#1 and #21), Yui Makino (#2), Ryō Hirohashi (#14), and Akino Arai (#22). "Tre" is Italian for "three."

Aria the Origination OST Japanese Release
No.	Title	Music	Arrangements	Length
1.	"Nanairo no Sora o (OVA Size)" (七色の空を-OVAサイズ-; Lyrics by Sonorous)	Sonorous	Choro Club	2:17
2.	"Spirale (TV Size)" (スピラーレ-TVサイズ-; Lyrics by Eri Kawai)	Mina Kubota	Mina Kubota	1:56
3.	"Rakuyou no Namikimichi" (落葉の並木道)	Shigeharu Sasago	Choro Club	3:15
4.	"Odayakana Gogo" (おだやかな午後)	Ou Akioka	Choro Club	1:49
5.	"Yuuyami Kogi" (夕闇漕ぎ)	Jouji Sawada	Choro Club	2:27
6.	"Tayorinai Funade" (頼りない船出)	Shigeharu Sasago	Choro Club	1:48
7.	"Nemuri no Mori de" (眠りの森で)	Jouji Sawada	Choro Club	2:33
8.	"Aria to Osanpo" (アリアとお散歩)	Shigeharu Sasago	Choro Club	1:44
9.	"Tsunaida Te to Te" (つないだ手と手)	Shigeharu Sasago	Choro Club	2:36
10.	"Bourou" (望楼)	Ou Akioka	Choro Club	2:22
11.	"Amaretto no Natsu" (アマレットの夏)	Takeshi Senoo	Takeshi Senoo	2:59
12.	"Jet Kiryuu" (ジェット気流)	Jouji Sawada	Choro Club	2:49
13.	"Mirai he no Kouseki" (未来への航跡)	Takeshi Senoo	Takeshi Senoo	3:45
14.	"Lumis Eterne" (ルーミス エテルネ; Lyrics by Mina Kubota)	Mina Kubota	Mina Kubota	4:36
15.	"Kaze Yomi" (風読み)	Jouji Sawada	Choro Club	2:56
16.	"Majo" (魔女)	Jouji Sawada	Choro Club	1:41
17.	"Yuudachi no Ato de" (夕立ちのあとで)	Ou Akioka	Choro Club	2:51
18.	"quiet tea time"	Shigeharu Sasago	Choro Club	2:46
19.	"Chiisana Shiawase" (小さな幸せ)	Ou Akioka	Choro Club	3:25
20.	"Eien no Umi: A Song for Zephyr" (永遠の海 〜A Song for Zephyr〜)	Takeshi Senoo	Takeshi Senoo	3:03
21.	"Nanairo no Sora o (choro ver.)" (七色の空を-choro ver.-)	Sonorous	Choro Club	2:30
22.	"Kin no Nami Sen no Nami (TV Size)" (金の波 千の波-TVサイズ-; Lyrics by Akino Arai)	Hisaaki Hogari	Akino Arai/Hisaaki Hogari	1:56
23.	"Shiki: Soshite Boku ha Umi ni Kaeru" (四季 〜そして僕は海に還る〜)	Takeshi Senoo	Takeshi Senoo	2:41
Total length:				60:45

=== Aria the Origination Piano Collection II: Di Partenza ===
A second album of piano music titled Aria the Origination Piano Collection II: Di Partenza was released under the Victor Entertainment label on 26 March 2008, and peak ranked 56th on the Oricon albums chart. It had piano versions of music from the third and final season performed by Takeshi Senoo for all tracks except numbers 2, 6, and 9, which were performed by Mina Kubota (#2 and #9) and Sonorous (#6). "Di partenza" is Italian for "of departures."

Aria the Origination Piano Collection II: Di Partenza Japanese Release
No.	Title	Music	Arrangements	Length
1.	"Shiki: Soshite Boku wa Umi ni Kaeru" (四季 〜そして僕は海に還る〜)	Takeshi Senoo	Takeshi Senoo	2:41
2.	"Spirale" (スピラーレ)	Mina Kubota	Mina Kubota	2:43
3.	"Itsuka Kita Michi" (いつか来た道)	Takeshi Senoo	Takeshi Senoo	2:55
4.	"Eien no Umi: A Song for Zephyr" (永遠の海 ~A Song for Zephyr~)	Takeshi Senoo	Takeshi Senoo	3:16
5.	"Waltz for Aria"	Takeshi Senoo	Takeshi Senoo	2:11
6.	"Nanairo no Sora o" (七色の空を)	Sonorous	Sonorous	2:18
7.	"Mirai he no Kouseki" (未来への航跡)	Takeshi Senoo	Takeshi Senoo	3:45
8.	"Amaretto no Natsu" (アマレットの夏)	Takeshi Senoo	Takeshi Senoo	1:58
9.	"Kin no Nami Sen no Nami" (金の波 千の波)	Akino Arai/Hisaaki Hogari	Mina Kubota	2:48
10.	"Bourou" (望楼)	Ou Akioka	Takeshi Senoo	2:51
11.	"Tenki Ame" (天気雨)	Takeshi Senoo	Takeshi Senoo	3:24
12.	"Ashita, Yuugure Made" (明日、夕暮れまで)	Katsutoshi Kitagawa	Takeshi Senoo	4:54
Total length:				35:44

=== Aria the Crepuscolo Original Soundtrack ===
No.	Title	Music	{{{extra_column}}}	Length
13.	"Ferichita" (フェリチタ)	Mina Kubota	Kiyono Yasuno	4:45

No.	Title	Music	{{{extra_column}}}	Length
14.	"Ekōesu" (エコーエス)	= Mina Kubota	Kiyono Yasuno	4:57

=== Aria the Origination: Aoi Hoshi no Il Cielo OP & ED Single ===
A single of the opening and ending themes of the visual novel Aria the Origination: Aoi Hoshi no El Cielo was released under the Media Factory label on 25 July 2008, and peak ranked 84th on the Oricon singles chart. It included vocal and instrumental versions of "Graceful Way", "Il Cielo", and "Hana no Saku Hoshi" performed by Kicco, Kana Hanazawa, and Mio Isayama, respectively, with lyrics by Chiyomaru Shikura for the first and the third songs and Daisuke Mizuno for the second.

Japanese Release
No.	Title	Music	Arrangements	Length
1.	"Graceful Way"	Chiyomaru Shikura	Koji Ueno	4:54
2.	"Il Cielo"	Daisuke Mizuno	Daisuke Mizuno	3:52
3.	"Hana no Saku Hoshi" (花ノ咲ク星)	Chiyomaru Shikura	Daisuke Mizuno	6:01
4.	"Graceful Way (Instrumental)"	Chiyomaru Shikura	Koji Ueno	4:53
5.	"Il Cielo (Instrumental)"	Daisuke Mizuno	Daisuke Mizuno	3:52
6.	"Hana no Saku Hoshi (Instrumental)"	Chiyomaru Shikura	Daisuke Mizuno	5:59
Total length:				29:31

=== Himawari ===
A tribute album to Eri Kawai titled Himawari was released on 24 December 2008 under the Victor Entertainment label, and peak ranked 151st on the Oricon albums chart. All tracks except numbers 11 and 12 are related to the Aria anime adaption. Tracks 3, 7, and 11 are "sample versions" made for the final singers, and tracks 13 through 16 are live versions of songs performed during Aria the Concert. All songs and themes are performed by Eri Kawai, who also wrote the lyrics for all songs except track 7. The album cover was drawn by Kozue Amano, the writer and illustrator of Aqua and Aria.

A portion of the profits from the album were donated to WWF Japan.

Himawari Japanese Release
No.	Title	Music	Arrangements	Length
1.	"Barcarole: dokushou" (バルカローレ-独唱-)	Mina Kubota	Eri Kawai	1:45
2.	"Mangetsu no Dolce" (満月のドルチェ)	Takeshi Senoo	Takeshi Senoo	4:02
3.	"Undine (Zougoshi Ver.)" (ウンディーネ -造語詞Ver.-)	Mina Kubota	Mina Kubota	5:44
4.	"Yuunagi" (夕凪)	Shigeharu Sasago	Choro Club	2:53
5.	"Coccolo (Organ Ver.)" (コッコロ -オルガンver.-)	Mina Kubota	Mina Kubota	2:17
6.	"Santa Claus no sora" (サンタクロウスの空)	Takeshi Senoo	Takeshi Senoo	3:58
7.	"Lumis Eterne" (ルーミス エテルネ; Lyrics by Mina Kubota)	Mina Kubota	Mina Kubota	4:37
8.	"Second Season: kibou" (Second Season 〜希望〜)	Takeshi Senoo	Takeshi Senoo	2:28
9.	"Aria"	Shigeharu Sasago	Takeshi Senoo	2:47
10.	"Mizu no Kagami" (水の鏡)	Shigeharu Sasago	Choro Club	4:51
11.	"Tanpopo suisha" (たんぽぽ水車; Not related to Aria)	Ken Muramatsu	Ken Muramatsu	4:02
12.	"Sunflower" (Not related to Aria)	Kawai Eri	Sadahiro Nakano	4:37
13.	"Mangetsu no Dolce (Live Ver.)" (満月のドルチェ -Live Ver.-)	Takeshi Senoo		4:47
14.	"Coccolo (Live Ver.)" (コッコロ -Live Ver.-)	Mina Kubota		3:18
15.	"Barcarole (Live Ver.)" (バルカローレ -Live Ver.-)	Mina Kubota		4:58
16.	"Santa Claus no sora (Live Ver.)" (サンタクロウスの空 -Live Ver.-)	Takeshi Senoo		6:34
Total length:				64:17

=== Aria the Box ===
A compilation triple album titled Aria the Box was released on 23 September 2009 under the Victor Entertainment label, and peak ranked 25th on the Oricon albums chart. The first CD contains the 25 best hits soundtracks selected by the anime adaptation director Jun'ichi Satō, the second one the theme and insert songs from the three anime seasons and OVA, and the last CD contains the compositions which were not used in the anime.

== Release details ==
Album details	Peak chart positions Oricon
Aria the Animation Original Soundtrack: Released: 23 November 2005; Label: Victor Entertainment (VICL-61795); Format: CD	102
Aria the Natural Original Soundtrack: Due: Released: 24 May 2006; Label: Victor Entertainment (VICL-61935); Format: CD	48
Aria Piano Collection – Stagione -: Released: 2 August 2006; Label: Victor Entertainment (VICL-62003); Format: CD	115
Aria the Natural Vocal Song Collection: Released: 6 September 2006; Label: Victor Entertainment (VICL-62044); Format: CD	30
Aria the Origination Original Soundtrack: Tre: Released: 20 February 2008; Label: Victor Entertainment (VTCL-60026); Format: CD	49
Aria the Origination Piano Collection II: Di Partenza: Released: 26 March 2008; Label: Victor Entertainment (VTCL-60023); Format: CD	56
Himawari: Released: 24 December 2008; Label: Victor Entertainment (VTCL-60083); Format: CD	151
Aria the Box: Released: 23 September 2009; Label: Victor Entertainment (VTCL-60114〜6); Format: CD	25

Single details	Peak chart positions Oricon
Aria the Animation Opening: Undine: Released: 21 October 2005; Label: Victor Entertainment (VICL-35898); Format: CD	25
Aria the Animation Ending: Rainbow: Released: 21 October 2005; Label: Victor Entertainment (VICL-35899); Format: CD	40
Aria the Natural Opening: Euforia: Released: 26 April 2006; Label: Victor Entertainment (VICL-35986); Format: CD	18
Aria the Natural Ending: Natsu Machi: Released: 26 April 2006; Label: Victor Entertainment (VICL-35987); Format: CD	23
Aria the Natural: Tooi Yume no Mirage OP & ED: Released: 6 October 2006; Label: Geneon Entertainment (VGCD-1004); Format: CD	74
Aria the OVA: Arietta OP & ED: Released: 21 September 2007; Label: Victor Entertainment (VICL-35001); Format: CD	35
Aria the Origination Opening: Spirale: Released: 23 January 2008; Label: Victor Entertainment (VTCL-35016); Format: CD	20
Aria the Origination Ending: Kin no Nami Sen no Nami: Released: 23 January 2008; Label: Victor Entertainment (VTCL-35018); Format: CD	26
Aria the Origination: Aoi Hoshi no Il Cielo OP & ED: Released: 25 July 2008; Label: Media Factory (FVCG-1035); Format: CD	84

== Reception ==
On 30 November 2007 was held Aria the Concert in the Nippon Seinen-kan hall. Most of the performers of the soundtracks of the anime franchise were present.

== See also ==
- List of Aria episodes
- List of Aria chapters
