= List of Aria episodes =

Cover of Japanese DVD release of Aria the Origination volume 1

The following is a list of episodes of the anime television series Aria, adapted from the science fiction manga series Aqua and Aria by Kozue Amano. Set in the early 24th century on a terraformed Mars, now called Aqua, it depicts the life of a young woman named Akari as a trainee gondolier tour guide, or undine, for Aria Company, including her friendships with her mentor, Alicia, and two other trainees, Aika and Alice.

The anime was produced by Hal Film Maker as a 54-episode television series comprising two seasons, an original video animation (OVA), and a third season. The series was directed by Jun'ichi Satō with character designs by Makoto Koga, and aired on TV Tokyo and TXN-affiliated stations between 2005 and 2008. All three seasons have been released on DVD in Japan. A new OVA, called Aria the Avvenire, was released in the 10th anniversary Blu-Ray Box sets of the anime series between 24 December 2015 and 24 June 2016.

Aria is licensed in English in North America by The Right Stuf International, subtitled DVD box sets of all seasons were released between 30 September 2008 and 16 March 2010 under its Nozomi Entertainment. The first two seasons plus the OVA were broadcast in Korea by Animax. The OVA and the third season are licensed in French by Kaze; episodes of the subtitled third season, Aria the Origination, was first broadcast by video on demand (VOD) starting on 2 June 2008, and a DVD box set was released on 28 November 2008. The first season was released on DVD in Taiwan by Muse Communications. All three seasons are licensed in Italy by Yamato Video, and the first season was broadcast on the RAI satellite channel SmashGirls in 2009.

== Aria the Animation (season 1) ==
The first season of Aria consisted of 13 episodes broadcast on TV Tokyo Network stations from 6 October 2005 to 29 December 2005. The opening theme is "Undine" (ウンディーネ) by Yui Makino and the ending theme is "Rainbow" by Round Table feat. Nino. The logo for this season is colored deep blue. The episodes were released in Japan on six DVDs between 25 January 2006 and 23 June 2006. A DVD season box set was released on 25 March 2009.

In North America, a DVD box set of English subtitled episodes was released on 30 September 2008 by The Right Stuf International under its Nozomi Entertainment imprint. In Taiwan, the series was released by Muse Communications in six DVDs subtitled in Chinese. In Korea, dubbed episodes were broadcast in 2006 by Animax, where it was the 6th most popular animated show broadcast that year. In Italy, the series is licensed by Yamato Video and dubbed episodes were broadcast on the RAI satellite channel SmashGirls starting 20 June 2009.

No.	Title	Original air date
1	"That Wonderful Miracle ..."; Transliteration: "Sono Suteki na Kiseki o ..." (Japanese: その 素敵な奇跡を...)	6 October 2005
A young girl, Ai, arrives at Aria Company and demands that Akari give her a gondola tour of the city of Neo-Venezia. When Akari protests that, as a Single (journeyman undine), she is not allowed to guide customers without a supervisor, Ai insists she be taken as a "friend" instead of a "customer," and Akari gives in. As they tour Neo-Venezia, Ai tells Akari she does not like it because of its inconveniences, to which Akari replies that the slow pace is exactly what she likes about Aqua. After meeting Akari's friend Aika for gondola practice and lunch, the older girls learn that Ai was predisposed to dislike Neo-Venezia because of her older sister's gushing after her honeymoon, which included a tour from Alicia. When President Aria, the company president and mascot, falls overboard and drifts out into the bay, Akari rows after him but he is saved instead by Alicia. At the end of the day, Ai has come to like Neo-Venezia through Akari and Aika, and asks to become Akari's penpal. That evening, Akari tells her mentor, Alicia, that it is a miracle to like something you had previously disliked.
2	"On That Special Day ..."; Transliteration: "Sono Tokubetsu na Hi ni ..." (Japanese: その 特別な日に...)	13 October 2005
During the annual flooding of Neo-Venezia, when the city comes to a standstill, Akari is caught out in a rainshower and shelters in Aika's room at Himeya Company. While there, Akari sees the other employees are deferential to Aika, the heir to the company. When Aika's strict mentor, Akira, chastises Aika for slacking off despite the flood, they fight and Aika leaves to stay the night with Akari at Aria Company. Aika describes in a flashback her first meeting with Alicia, and how Alicia inspired her to become an undine (gondolier). The next morning, Akira arrives to demand that Aika return home, and the trainees learn that their mentors have been friends and rivals since childhood. Akira set Akari and Aika to a gondola race to determine where Aika will stay, but partway through, Aika scraps the race because she plans to return, as she admires Akira for being the only one at Himeya Company to stand up to her. After they return with Akira's favorite walnut bread as an apology, Akari realizes Aika and her mentor are good friends despite their squabbling, and hopes she and Alicia will become friends like that.
3	"With That Transparent Young Girl ..."; Transliteration: "Sono Tōmei na Shōjo to ..." (Japanese: その 透明な少女と...)	20 October 2005
While training in a strait with difficult currents, Akari and Aika witness the impressive rowing skills of a younger girl, Alice. She bluntly refuses their attempts at friendship but is troubled by Akari's sincere smile. The next day, after Alice turns down schoolmates' request for her autograph on a magazine article about her, a classmate tells Alice she should at least have smiled. That afternoon, Akari meets Akatsuki, an apprentice salamander (weather controller), who asks to be given a city tour as a "friend" as she practices. As Alice passes them, she interprets Akatsuki's teasing of Akari as harassment, but after Akari explains she invites Alice along. Alice remains fascinated by Akari's smile, and after she finally smiles herself says she understands the secret of Akari's smile. At the end of the day, Akatsuki invites the two on a tour of the floating weather station where he lives, and the two girls are impressed by the sunset view.
4	"That Undeliverable Letter ..."; Transliteration: "Sono Todokanai Tegami wa ..." (Japanese: その 届かない手紙は...)	27 October 2005
President Aria leads Akari to a square with many cats, where she meets a girl wearing a belled collar who gives her a letter to deliver. In the morning, Mr. Mailman tells Akari the envelope contains an out-of-date format of video card but promises to locate the address for her. During gondola practice, Aria leads Akari to a canal she doesn't recognize, where the girl tells her the letter is important because it can "overcome time and space" and deliver messages to the heart, before being called inside a house as Ami. Mr. Mailman tells Akari that the address is of an abandoned terraforming base out in the middle of the Adriatic. Woody, a sylph (airborne deliveryman), takes Akari on his sky-cycle to the base, where they find only a cemetery is above water now. They locate the gravestone of the letter's recipient and Akari plays the letter to it. The video is from a woman (with a cat named Ami) writing to her husband while he was away working on the terraforming of Mars, now called Aqua, and Akari recognizes in the woman's background the place she met Ami the second time.
5	"To That Island Which Shouldn't Exist..."; Transliteration: "Sono Aru Hazu no Nai Shima e ..." (Japanese: その あるはずのない島へ...)	3 November 2005
Akari receives an anonymous invitation to Neverland, with directions that send her to an island in the Adriatic. On the island, she gets lost but meets Aika and Alice following similar messages. Together, they find a secluded cove where they meet Alicia and Akira, who with Alice's mentor Athena sent the invitations, although the latter is missing. The three younger undines spend the morning in special training, which includes rowing unstable logs instead of gondolas to practice balancing. After lunch, the five spend the afternoon in relaxed swimming, which Akari especially enjoys as the oceans on Manhome (Earth) cannot be swam in. When Akari loses a hair ribbon, she remembers a time she lost another hair tie while swimming when she was little. That night, while the others are asleep in a tent, Akari tells Alicia that when she was young she used to believe in Neverland, and that this beautiful bay on a human-created world must be another Neverland. Alicia tells Akari that important feelings are never forgotten, only buried, and after Akari thanks her she finds her lost hair ribbon in the water.
6	"That Which You Want to Protect ..."; Transliteration: "Sono Mamoritai mono ni ..." (Japanese: その 守りたいものに...)	10 November 2005
While Akari spends the night with Alice at Orange Planet, Alice says she is punishing her left hand because it is "useless" compared to her right. Alice introduces Akari to her kitten, Maa-kun, hidden in her wardrobe because pets are forbidden in company dorms, and then Athena, her mentor and roommate, the third (along with Alicia and Akira) of the so-called Three Great Water Fairies, whom Alice considers uselessly clumsy. Akari notices that Athena supports Alice in ways her student doesn't notice, and during the night, when Maa-kun starts crying his meows are covered up by Athena getting up to sing. Akari tells Alice that maybe left hands are not so useless, and the next day, Alice notices that her left hand does do some things, such as hold down notebooks while she writes. When she comes home from school, however, Maa-kun is gone from her room. She and Akari search for him, but do not find him until Athena sings a song to draw him out. Athena, who knew about the kitten all along, tells Alice that she has gotten Maa-kun named Orange Company's president, to replace their recently deceased president.
7	"Doing That Wonderful Job ..."; Transliteration: "Sono Suteki na Oshigoto o ..." (Japanese: その 素敵なお仕事を...)	17 November 2005
Akira takes Akari, Aika, and Alice out into the canals for training, where she is critical of their performances. Partway through the morning, she picks up a honeymoon couple for a gondola tour, with the younger undines observing. The couple, especially the woman, is impressed by Akira's professional demeanor and ask they be allowed to observe the afternoon training. The couple finds that Akira is a harsher trainer than guide. When Alicia brings them a mid-afternoon snack, the woman recognizes her as another of the Three Great Water Fairies. At the end of the afternoon, Akira purposely entraps the trainees in a maze of canals formed by the rising tide and several low-lying bridges. After failing separately to find a way out, they work together: Alice notices a current running through an abandoned building, which they follow, Akari rowing and Aika navigating with a lantern. Akira treats them all to pizza, refusing to scold the trainees for their failure as they are already feeling remorseful.
8	"That Melancholy President ... / That Cool Hero ..."; Transliteration: "Sono Yūutsu na Shachōttara ... / Sono Iketeru Hīrō tteba ..." (Japanese: その 憂鬱な社長ったら... / その イケてるヒーローってば...)	24 November 2005
In the first half of a two-part episode, Akari and Alicia give the Aria Company building a late-summer spring-cleaning. President Aria is eager to help, but only ends up getting in the way. Depressed, he runs away, and Alicia and Akari interpret his note not to look for him as his staying out of their way. As a result, they don't miss him until dinner-time, when he returns because he is hungry and lonely and has no other place to go. In the second half, President Aria emulates his favorite cat superhero from a comic book by dressing in a mask and cape. He tries to help and impress others anonymously, but everyone recognizes him despite his best efforts to hide his identity. After many tribulations he successfully returns a stuffed animal a girl dropped and returns home feeling like a success.
9	"That Starlike Fairy ..."; Transliteration: "Sono Hoshi no Yōna Yōsei wa ..." (Japanese: その 星のような妖精は...)	1 December 2005
Aika and Alice tell Akari about Grandma Akino, once the best undine of Neo-Venezia and founder of Aria Company. When Aika complains she feels her training is in a rut, that she is not getting closer to her goal of becoming the best undine on Aqua, Alicia suggests the three trainees visit Grandma, now in retirement in the countryside. When they arrive, Aika respectfully asks Grandma for her guidance. When Grandma asks for help with domestic chores, Aika interprets them as training tasks: that collecting chestnuts is an exercise in picking out customers in a crowd, that digging up sweet potatoes is an exercise in handling fragile baggage. In both cases, Alice (by being quietly efficient) and Akari (by enjoying something she could not do on Manhome) each gather more than Aika. That night, when the girls go outside to admire the bright stars, Grandma tells them the secret to becoming a good undine is to enjoy every moment, and that if they have fun being in a gondola, she can teach them nothing. When they see shooting stars, the trainees make wishes that they become great undines.
10	"That Warm Holiday ..."; Transliteration: "Sono Hokahoka na Kyūjitsu wa..." (Japanese: その ほかほかな休日は...)	8 December 2005
When Akari and Alicia collect firewood for the winter, Akari meets the first snow bugs (fuzzy white insects) of the season, and one stays with her as they return to the city. When Alicia learns Akari has never been to a hot spring, she invites the three trainees to one on their next day off. As Mr. Mailman and Akari watch smoke rise from the city's chimneys at sunset, he compliments her on the hair bow she gave her snow bug, and that night Alicia lights their fireplace. When Alicia takes the trainees to the hot spring, Akari is startled to learn that it is communal bathing but enjoys the waters. That evening, when she feels guilty for not practicing, Alicia tells her hot springs help one through winter. Akari agrees, saying that cute snow bugs, sunsets, and fireplaces also make one like winter. Returning to the baths, Alicia takes them to a secret corner where the water runs outside into the ocean. Akira and Athena join the party for the night, and as the first snow falls, the snow bugs leave the city for the forest, Akari's included.
11	"Those Orange Days ..."; Transliteration: "Sono Orenji no Hibi o ..." (Japanese: その オレンジの日々を...)	15 December 2005
Akari, Aika, and Alice return to Aria Company after practice to find their three mentors talking, and learn they once also did combined training but have seldom all met together since becoming Primas (full undines). In flashbacks, their mentors tell the story of how Alicia and Akira as Singles hear of Orange Planet's new prodigy; when they meet a Single from Orange Planet named Athena, Akira asks about this unknown rival, but Athena is unable to answer her. They invite her to train with them, and soon realize that Athena is neither as graceful a rower as Alicia nor as adept a guide as Akira. However, when they practice singing one day, Athena's voice is so beautiful that passersby stop and applaud, and Akira realizes Athena had been the prodigy all along. In the present, Alice realizes that her trio will also break up after they become Primas, and Alicia tells her that it is important to enjoy the present and not regret what has been—or will be—lost. When Akari escorts Aika and Alice home, she begins to cry after they part ways.
12	"That Soft Wish ..."; Transliteration: "Sono Yawaraka na Negai wa ..." (Japanese: その やわらかな願いは...)	22 December 2005
On a snowy day, Akari visits Neo-Venezia's oldest bridge, outside the current city. As Akari crosses it, cats appear, and on the other side the snow is mostly melted, the sky clear, and the canal dry. She meets a woman, Akiko, who does not recognize her uniform or know what an undine is. Akiko invites Akari home for tea, in a neighborhood Akari doesn't recognize. Akiko and Akari both attribute their ignorance about the other's life to being new immigrants, but when Akari sees the memory card in Akiko's camera is the same format as the letter delivered in episode 4, she realizes she has traveled in time to before Neo-Venezia was built. Back at the canal, people gather to witness the arrival of water, a result of the terraforming—an event one watcher calls a sign that Aqua has finally accepted the colonists. When Akari says goodbye, Akiko, who has realized where Akari is from by her anachronistic comments, says cats are a link between past and future, and bids farewell to her future, and when Akari crosses the bridge she is back in the snow of her own time.
13	"That White Morning ..."; Transliteration: "Sono Masshiro na Asa o ..." (Japanese: その まっしろな朝を...)	29 December 2005
For New Year's, Akari goes with Alicia to Piazza San Marco, where she meets Ai who is making a surprise visit. Ai meets several of Akari's friends, including Akatsuki and his brother, Woody, Aika, Akira, Grandma Akino, Alice, and Athena, all of whom she has only known from their correspondence, but embarrasses Akari by disclosing personal gossip she had included. When President Aria runs off into the crowd, Ai and Akari give chase, following his footprints through the snow. They reach an old canal and see on the other side the snow-free buildings of Akiko's time (from episode 12) and several cats, including Ami (from episode 4). When a bell rings, the city of their own time appears, and they interpret the vision as Aqua's acceptance of Ai. They return to the Piazza, where Aria has already come back, in time for the midnight celebrations and stay until sunrise. As Akari and Alicia row home, they wish each other a happy new year, and Akari silently wishes all residents of the "beautiful planet", past and present, a new year filled with happiness.

== Aria the Natural (season 2) ==
The second season of Aria of 26 episodes was broadcast on TV Tokyo Network stations and AT-X from 2 April 2006 to 24 September 2006. The production staff remained mostly unchanged from the first season. The opening themes are "Euforia" (ユーフォリア) by Yui Makino for episodes 1–15 and 18–26 and "Undine" (ウンディーネ) by Yui Makino for episodes 16–17. The ending themes are "Natsumachi" (夏待ち) by Round Table feat. Nino for episodes 1–15, "Smile Again" by Erino Hazuki for episodes 16–25, and "Rainbow" by Round Table feat. Nino for episode 26. The logo for this season is colored aqua. The episodes were released in Japan on 9 DVDs from 25 July 2006 to 23 March 2007; a DVD season box set was released on 25 November 2009.

In North America, the season was released in two box sets of subtitled episodes by The Right Stuf International under its Nozomi Entertainment imprint on 29 January and 24 March 2009. The season was broadcast in dubbed episodes in Korea by Animax. In Italy, the series is licensed Yamato Video.

No.	Title	Original air date
1	"That Encounter at the Carnival ..."; Transliteration: "Sono Kānibaru no Deai wa ..." (Japanese: その カーニバルの出逢いは...)	2 April 2006
When Ai visits Akari for Neo-Venezia's Carnevale, she helps out at Aria Company. Before the festival starts, she sees President Aria leave by himself, and Akari tells her he'll be gone for the duration. On the first day of celebrations, Akari and Ai meet Casanova, the mysterious masked master of ceremonies of the Carnevale named after the historical figure. Later, on Ai's last day on Aqua, while talking with Aika and Alice they spot one of Casanova's attendants. They chase after him but Akari and Ai get separated from the others. Eventually they confront Casanova, who invites them to join his cheering procession for a while. When he eventually stops them from following any further, he gives them each a jasmine flower before revealing that President Aria is one of his attendants, and that he is Cait Sith, the legendary king of Aqua's cats. When Aika and Alice finally find Akari and Ai, they claim that Casanova is a fairy.
2	"Looking For That Treasure ..."; Transliteration: "Sono Takaramono o Sagashite ..." (Japanese: その 宝物をさがして...)	9 April 2006
During rowing practice on the first warm day of early spring, Aika, Akari, and Alice find a box in the base of a statue. Inside it is a note that sends them on a treasure hunt through the streets of Neo-Venezia. One clue leads them to Caffè Florian on Piazza San Marco that's the Venetian cafe (transported to Aqua) where cafe latte was supposedly invented, where Akari chats with a customer who calls himself an expert at enjoying the Piazza. After the shadow from the Campanile has moved far enough the three can find their next clue, he prays they discover a wonderful treasure. Their final clue leads them to a beautiful hillside view of Neo-Venezia, described as a "treasure in your heart". When they return the clues, so others can find this treasure for themselves, they notice marks indicating they are not the first to do so. Back at the Piazza, Alicia introduces the man as the cafe's owner, and he greets Akari as an "Expert in Happiness." In response to Akari's e-mail about the day, Ai calls Neo-Venezia a big treasure chest.
3	"The Night of the Meteor Shower ..."; Transliteration: "Sono Ryūseigun no Yoru ni ..." (Japanese: その 流星群の夜に...)	16 April 2006
When Akari learns there will be a meteor shower that night, she, Aika, and Alice make plans to watch it. As they do so, they meet Al, a gnome (an underground regulator of Aqua's gravity) on a shopping trip to the planet's surface, who invites them to lunch. In return a blushing Aika invites him to join them that night. That evening, Alice bows out, leaving just Aika, Al, and Akari. Because Piazza San Marco is too crowded and bright, they search through the narrow streets for a better view. For courage through the darker passages, Akari repeats her chant from Casanova's procession. Eventually, Aika takes them onto the roof of a Himeya Company office building, with an unobstructed panorama of the night-time city and the meteors. When Akari searches the rooftops for another vantage, Aika realizes she's alone with Al and gets flustered, and blames him as a gravity regulator for attracting all the meteors that burn up in the atmosphere. As they walk home, Al reminds Aika that some meteors don't burn up but survive to reach the surface.
4	"That Neo-Venezia-Colored Heart ..."; Transliteration: "Sono Neo Venetsia-iro no Kokoro wa ..." (Japanese: その ネオ·ヴェネツィア色の心は...)	23 April 2006
Mr. Mailman borrows Akari and her gondola for a day so he can complete his rounds while his gondola is repaired. In the morning, they collect mail from canal-side postboxes, then after lunch deliver the mail—and along the way help a boy deliver in person a letter to his former teacher at her wedding, apologizing for behaving badly to her because he was upset over her leaving. At the end of the day, Mr. Mailman explains that Neo-Venezians prefer the inconvenience of mail because a letter, being not as quickly written as e-mail, can carry the sender's heart, and so can become a treasure, and furthermore it can be a link between the past and present. Akari says that letters are like Neo-Venezia, in that you can touch the creators' hearts through them, and Mr. Mailman tells her that she has been painted with "the color of Neo-Venezia". The next morning, Akari is moved when she receives his hand-written thank-you note.
5	"The Wonder of That Rainy Day... / The Discoveries on That Spring Day ..."; Transliteration: "Sono Ame no Hi no Suteki wa ... / Sono Haru ni Mitsuketa Mono wa ..." (Japanese: その 雨の日の素敵は... / その 春にみつけたものは...)	30 April 2006
In the first half of a two-part episode, Alicia takes Akari to an island to visit a reproduction of a Japanese Inari shrine. When Akari buys some inari sushi, the saleswoman warns that if she meets any fox spirits, not to go with them. After getting separated from Alicia during a sunshower, Akari meets a wedding procession of fox spirits, and one holds out his hand to her. Frightened, she gives him her inari sushi, and they leave her. In the second half, Alicia takes Akari on a picnic to look for spring at a special place she knows on another island. After walking through a forest, they follow an old railway, but at a fork in the line they chose the wrong way. Just as they are about to turn back, they find an abandoned rail-car beneath a large blooming cherry tree. While they admire it, Alicia tells a story about the importance of making mistakes in serendipity.
6	"The Smile Reflected in that Mirror ..."; Transliteration: "Sono Kagami ni Utsuru Egao wa ..." (Japanese: その 鏡にうつる笑顔は...)	7 May 2006
When Alice leaves Orange Planet, Athena notices she doesn't stay with the other Pairs but goes off alone. After practice Akari and Aika visit Alice and Athena's dorm room, and when it becomes late without their noticing, Athena invites them to stay the night. That evening, Alice notices that Athena is more clumsy than usual and accuses her of being happy, and Athena says it's because Alice seems to be having fun with her friends. Alice receives an invitation to a party with other Pairs, but turns it down despite Akari's urging because she thinks they're jealous of her talent as a younger undine. Athena tells her that people are like mirrors, and that they reflect her fear of being rejected, which she sees as envy. After watching Maa go to great effort to climb onto a bed to bite President Aria's belly, Alice resolves to try to smile more and attend the party.
7	"To The Kingdom of Cats ..."; Transliteration: "Sono Nekotachi no Ōkoku e ..." (Japanese: その 猫たちの王国へ...)	14 May 2006
During practice, Akari, Alice, and Aika see President Aria traveling in his own boat, and follow him to a channel that's usually gated off before stopping because Alice has to leave for school. That evening, Akari tells Alicia she had a feeling they shouldn't have followed him further. Alicia mentions the Manhome legend of a kingdom of the cats, which humans can't enter, which reminds Akari of how Cait Sith stopped her and Ai during the Carnevale. The next day, while Alice practices with two Pairs she met at the Orange Planet party, Akari and Aika see President Aria again and follow him, and this time continue past the gate. They end up in a labyrinth of flooded buildings that has them traveling in circles while being watched by cats. When Akari apologizes for trying to enter their domain, President Aria appears and shows them the way out. As they leave, Akari looks back and sees the building filled with cats, including Cait Sith, who bows to her.
8	"The Day of Festa Del Bòcolo ..."; Transliteration: "Sono Bokkoro no Hi ni ..." (Japanese: その ボッコロの日に...)	21 May 2006
As Akari wades through the streets during Neo-Venezia's annual flooding, she realizes it's Festa del Bòcolo, the day women receive a single red rose from admirers. She meets Akatsuki, who is buying as many roses as he can for Alicia, because just one won't express his "infinite" love, and needs Akari's help carrying them. When they run into Aika, she also has a rose for Alicia and runs ahead to give hers first. When a saleswoman tells Akari the origin of Bòcolo in a tragic Manhome legend about a knight and his lady, Akari comments that the knight's love lives on in roses. Aika fails to find Alicia but meets Al, who gives her an uncut red gemstone called "Eye of the Rose", which he says will look good on her when polished. Akatsuki and Akari finally meet Alicia, but he is too nervous to present Alicia his roses before she assumes he had given them to Akari, and leaves them alone together. As Akatsuki flounders after Alicia, he spills the roses, and Akari describes them as his feelings spreading out across the water, saying they will reach Alicia as they drift on the current. For helping him, Akatsuki gives Akari her first Bòcolo rose.
9	"Those Honest Stars ..."; Transliteration: "Sono Sugao no Hoshitachi wa ..." (Japanese: その 素顔の星たちは...)	28 May 2006
When Akari gives a city tour as an undine under Alicia's supervision, her clients discover a flower garden she hadn't known about. After the tour, the three trainees search for more secret wonders of Neo-Venezia, during which Aika and Alice compete to show a wonder the other doesn't know. During that night's planned maintenance blackout, because Akari is afraid of the dark, Alicia sets out candles at Aria Company, turning it into "another world", and offers to sleep in Akari's room. When Akari despairs about how little she knows and of ever reaching Alicia's level as an undine, Alicia tells a story of her own ignorance of the city when she was a Single, and a flashback shows Akino comforting her with advice on how to find hidden wonders in things held closely. When they retire for the night, they discover the unsuspected beauty of starlight through the skylights in Akari's room, showing that a place can show different beauties at different times. Alicia says she is glad there she will always have new wonders to discover, and Akari agrees.
10	"That Heartwarming Town And Its People ..."; Transliteration: "Sono Atataka na Machi to Hitobito to ..." (Japanese: その あたたかな街と人々と...)	4 June 2006
During practice, Aika and Alice watch Akari exchange friendly greetings with several people. Alice comments that Akari seems to know more Neo-Venezians than they do, although they are locals and Akari is an immigrant, which she finds "mysterious". Aika and Alice decide to secretly watch Akari as she runs errands to find out how she makes friends so easily. The follow her onto the vaporetto ferry and watch her chat with fellow passengers, conversing easily although they just met. Because they are hiding, the two miss Akari's stop but see her disembark with a mysterious man. After they backtrack on another vaporetto, they follow President Aria's voice to find he and Akari enjoying the man's street puppet performance, which Aika and Alice both remember watching as children. Alice concludes that Akari's mysterious ability comes from her taking joy in nearly everything and being naturally nice to everyone.
11	"That Precious Sparkle ..."; Transliteration: "Sono Taisetsu na Kagayaki ni ..." (Japanese: その 大切な輝きに...)	16 June 2006
Akatsuki's older brother gives Akari her first commission, hiring her to transport some glassware by gondola. At the glassmaker's workshop, she overhears a tourist disparaging Neo-Venezian glassware as an inferior copy of Venetian glass—just as Neo-Venezia is an imitation Venice. The apprentice glassmaker supervising the cargo rudely refuses to let Akari help carry it. As Akari rows she tells him the glass is beautiful and admires how it sparkles in many colors. The apprentice complains that some people judge purely on the basis of tradition, which for glassmakers was broken between the sinking of Venice and the building of Neo-Venezia. He apologises for his behavior, saying he's upset because people have been dismissing his master's glassware as imitations and fakes, although his master works so hard. Akari tells him she doesn't believe anything is fake, and while Neo-Venezia may look like Venice, the process of building it was different, as are the people who live in it, which makes it a living city to be cherished for itself. When they deliver the cargo, Akatsuki's brother accuses the apprentice of becoming Akari's fan, and so a rival of Akatsuki.
12	"Chasing That Mirage ... / The Light From That Nightshine Chime ..."; Transliteration: "Sono Nigemizu o Otte ... / Sono Yakōrin no Hikari wa ..." (Japanese: その 逃げ水を追って... / その 夜光鈴の光は...)	18 June 2006
In the first half of a two-part episode, on a summer day hot enough to see mirages on the ocean, Akari goes shopping in the afternoon. Through the heatwaves, she sees the street suddenly empty of people and thinks she has wandered into a dream. She follows President Aria into a cool cafe where only iced milk is served, because it's a refuge for the city's cats where humans usually cannot go. When Akari leaves, she sees Cait Sith tip his hat to her, and then the cafe turns into a boarded-up building and the people return. In the second half, Akari buys a nightshine windchime, a summer specialty of Aqua with a noctilucent clapper. For the month its glow lasts, she takes it everywhere with her, and at night holds tea parties with President Aria in her gondola, using it as their light. When it begins flickering out, Alicia and Akari follow Neo-Venezian custom and row out into bay to let the clapper drop into the water when it dies. When Akari's does so, it leaves behind a rare tear-shaped crystal, and Akari begins crying.
13	"Those Really Self-Imposed Rules ..."; Transliteration: "Sono Dekkai Jibun Rūru o ..." (Japanese: その でっかい自分ルールを...)	25 June 2006
Alice tells Aika and Akari that she's having bad luck that day because she failed yesterday's personal challenge, which Akari calls childish and cute. The next day she sets the challenge of walking home from school stepping only on shadows, and she almost makes it before failing. Athena happens to see this from her gondola and sings a song that distracts Alice. The following day, Alice attempts the same challenge, and this time meets Athena on the way. When Athena catches Alice from tripping over Maa, Alice makes a new rule banning assistance from others, saying "this is my battle", and starts over. In crossing the last stretch outside Orange Planet, Alice misses a jump but Athena suddenly provides her with a shadow. When asked why, Athena says she's an ally of Alice, like an ally character in a video game. Alice makes another rule that Athena is allowed to help, and walks the rest of the way in her shadow. Akari describes the song that Athena sings as making one "light-hearted," and Alice realizes Athena had sung it the previous day to cheer her up and that Athena has been her ally all along.
14	"That Newest Memory ..."; Transliteration: "Sono Ichiban Atarashii Omoide ni ..." (Japanese: その いちばん新しい想い出に...)	2 July 2006
When Akari asks Alicia why Aria Company doesn't have a distinctive palina, or pole for hitching boats, Alicia doesn't know and suggests that Akari design one. Looking for inspiration, Akari searches the company archives and finds sketches for a palina design. Grandma Akino visits while in the city on business and tells her the sketch was made by one of her first employees, and was never executed because the company colors hadn't been decided. Akari comes up with a design in blue (for the sea and sky) and white, based on the old design and current company uniforms, and paints it herself. As they admire the new palina, Alicia says that one day, after she retires, Akari as a Prima will one day look at it with a junior employee of her own—at which time the palina will represent Akari as she is now. Akari replies that, no, Alicia is also part of the palina, and the original designer is as well. Ai writes that this means reading an old e-mail of theirs would let someone meet the two of them as they were at that time.
15	"In the Center of That Large Circle ..."; Transliteration: "Sono Hiroi Wakka no Naka de ..." (Japanese: その 広い輪っかの中で...)	9 July 2006
As Akari eats lunch alone on a hot midsummer day, she is joined by Akira, then Akatsuki, and then Al. As Akatsuki bickers with Akira, Al claims he was always hotheaded like that, and tells a story about Akatsuki, Woody, and himself when they all were boys, shown in a flashback: one time in a playground, they don't let two new kids play with them, but when one jumps off a swing further than Akatsuki can, he challenges that kid to a slide race, during which Akatsuki crashes and concedes defeat. Back in the present, Alicia (who overhears the story) says it brings back memories, and reveals the two kids were Akira and herself. Akari says that it's nice, the way the lives of the other four circle around and meet again, inside the large circle that is Aqua, and that she feels left out because she's been in Neo-Venezia for only a short time. Akira reassures Akari that she's already inside their circle of friends, at the center. As the episode ends, Athena is shown rowing by, then several other characters meet in a series of chance encounters.
16	"Parting With That Gondola ..."; Transliteration: "Sono Gondora to no Wakare wa ..." (Japanese: その ゴンドラとの別れは...)	16 July 2006
During a routine inspection, Akari and Alicia are told that Akari's gondola is too worn-out for tourist service and should be sold as a freight hauler. When Akari asks to keep it just for training, she's told that the gondola would be happier if it were used daily instead of infrequently. At Alicia's suggestion, Akari takes the gondola on a "Goodbye, Gondola-san tour" of places where she has special memories it was involved in, shown in a series of flashbacks, including taking Akatsuki as her first paying customer and meeting Alice, ending with her retracing the route of her test for promotion to Single from before the series began. While descending a canal lock on her return, she falls asleep and dreams the spirit of the gondola appears and says it was fate that brought them together. As she returns to Aria Company, she is reminded of the first time she rowed the gondola.
17	"After That Rainy Night ..."; Transliteration: "Sono Ame Furu Yoru ga Akereba ..." (Japanese: その 雨降る夜が明ければ...)	23 July 2006
Continuing the previous episode, that evening, Alicia and Akari eat a picnic dinner on the worn-out training gondola. Alicia tells Akari this was also her first gondola at Aria Company, and a flashback shows her as a Pair colliding with a bridge during her first lesson with Grandma Akino. Another series of flashbacks shows Alicia and Akari as Pairs each learning how to clean the gondola. Aika, Akira, Alice, and Athena join them for a "Thank You, Gondola-san party". Akari's photo of the three trainees with the gondola reminds Athena of a similar one of the three mentors, and a flashback shows it being taken on Alicia's promotion to Prima, when she had to give the black training gondola up for a Prima's white gondola. After the party, Akari stays in the gondola late into the night even after it starts to rain, and when she falls asleep, the spirit of the gondola puts an umbrella over her. A few days later, as Akari rows her replacement gondola back to Aria Company, she is startled when she passes her old one carrying a full load. Ai tells Akari that she'll have many new experiences with her new gondola.
18	"That New Me ..."; Transliteration: "Sono Atarashii Jibun ni ..." (Japanese: その 新しい自分に...)	20 July 2006
Aika arrives at a barbecue party with a beautiful new hairstyle, and when Alicia praises it, she is greatly pleased as it represents, she tells Akari, a "new me". A little later her hair catches fire from a grill, and after Akira puts it out Aika runs away to cry. At home at Himeya Company, as Akari and Alice help trim away her damaged hair, Aika says she'd been growing it as long as Alicia's hair in order to become more like Alicia, but now it's impossible. Akira overhears this and says yes, it's impossible for her to become an undine like Alicia. Aika tries to run away again, but Akira stops her and explains that it's impossible to impersonate someone else, and she should simply aim to become the best undine in Neo-Venezia by being herself. The next day, Aika cuts her hair very short to express her confident new self.
19	"That Crybaby ... / That Young Girl's Heart ..."; Transliteration: "Sono Nakimushi-san ttara ... / Sono Otomegokoro tteba ..." (Japanese: その 泣き虫さんったら... / その 乙女心ってば...)	6 August 2006
In the first half of a two-part episode, a week after cutting her hair, Aika catches a cold. While laid up in her room, she worries whether Akari and Alice will slack off practicing without her. On the third day, bored and restless, she sneaks out of Himeya Company to get some pudding. She buys some cute hairpins at a market stall and eats some gelato, but when she sees Akari and Alice at practice, she runs back to her room. When Akari and Alice a visit a short time later to bring her pudding, they find her crying because the world was going on without her, and they reassure her that she still has a place with them. In the second half, two days later, Aika returns to practice but spends the day distracted by the urge to show off her new haircut and hairpins to Al, although the thought of doing so embarrasses her without understanding why. With Akari and Alice's encouragement, she visits Al, who likes the change.
20	"That Shadowless Invitation ..."; Transliteration: "Sono Kage no Nai Maneku Mono wa ..." (Japanese: その 影のない招くものは...)	13 August 2006
During a summer heatwave, Akari sees a lady in a black dress and veil near Piazza San Marco. While waiting for Alice, Aika tells Akari a Manhome ghost story about an executed Venetian woman who spirited away gondoliers who rowed her to the cemetery of Isola di San Michele, where she was refused burial, with the conclusion that she has been seen in Neo-Venezia. That evening, the lady in black politely asks Akari for a ride to Neo-Venezia's recreation of San Michele, and Akari agrees to take her as a friend. As they cross the bay, they are watched by dozens of cats from the rooftops. When they arrive, the lady drags Akari into the cemetery, saying she wants to keep her "friend" with her forever. Her veil blows off, revealing an empty dress, and in a gust of wind Cait Sith appears behind her. The dress runs away, and Cait Sith embraces Akari, who then she wakes up at Aria Company holding a rose petal from the cemetery. The next day, Alice explains that the ghost story is not from Manhome but was invented on Aqua—which makes the black lady even more scary.
21	"That Night of the Galaxy Express ..."; Transliteration: "Sono Ginga Tetsudō no Yoru ni ..." (Japanese: その 銀河鉄道の夜に...)	20 August 2006
A distant train wakes Akari at 2:00 AM, although Neo-Venezia's railway has shut down for the night. The next morning, she suggests to Aika and Alice that it's the train from Night on the Galactic Railroad. President Aria sees Akari rereading the novel, and that night brings her a ticket sealed with Cait Sith's giant paw-print. The next day she tells Aika and Alice she has a feeling it would be better if she didn't meet Cait Sith again, but Alicia later encourages her to take this chance to get close to "Aqua's spirit". Late that night, President Aria takes her to the tracks, which were not present during the day, and when a train arrives, several cats start to board. Before Akari can follow, she notices a kitten has lost its ticket and gives it hers. She recognizes the disguised conductor as Cait Sith and thanks him for saving her in the cemetery, and they embrace. She asks why he watches over her and in response, he stamps her forehead like a ticket. As the train departs, Cait Sith takes off his conductor's cap to her, and in the morning the stamp is still on her forehead.
22	"That Mysterious World ... / That Guardian of Aqua ..."; Transliteration: "Sono Parareru Wārudo de ... / Sono Akua o Mamoru Mono yo ..." (Japanese: その パラレルワールドで... / その アクアを守るものよ...)	27 August 2006
In the first half of a two-part episode, after Akari suggests that between the stairs might be a gate to a parallel world, President Aria squeezes through and finds himself in world where the other characters are of the opposite sex. When he realizes what has happened, he begins crying and runs back to Aria Company to try to return home through the stairs. The male Alicia finds him there and tries tossing him in the air to cheer him up, then the female Woody takes him up in her air-cycle, but drops him. When President Aria comes to, he is back home. In the second half, Arata tells Alicia and Akari a story, seen in a flashback, about his younger brother as a boy, when he pretended to be an artificial human who was the "protector of Aqua". When his brother teases him by pretending to have been replaced by an evil alien, Akatsuki runs away in fear, and is calmed by his mother bringing him his superhero cape and identifying him as artificial. In the present, when Akatsuki finds out what his brother has done, he goes into shock.
23	"That Sea, Love, and Heart ..."; Transliteration: "Sono Umi to Koi to Omoi to ..." (Japanese: その 海と恋と想いと...)	3 September 2006
Near the end of summer, Alicia (assisted by Akari) gives a tour to an older couple celebrating their wedding anniversary. The husband turns down his wife's suggestion of visiting Piazza San Marco after lunch and orders her to meet him at the harbor later in the afternoon. Later, Akari, Aika, and Alice meet him having an argument with a man who won't rent him the bucintoro boat for the "Marriage of the Sea" ceremony (performed in Neo-Venezia by the mayor instead of the Doge of Venice), which his wife has long wished to see. Akari offers to help the couple, using her gondola as a substitute, and the three trainees decorate it to the best of their abilities. Aika finds a volunteer band to play the music, and as they start the ceremony, Alicia, Akira, and Athena's customers ask to watch. Because the husband forgets to bring the ring, they use one bought by the wife that afternoon. During the ceremony, the wife calls their recreation clumsy but thanks her husband for the gesture, and when the ceremony is over she asks him to love her forever.
24	"Those Undines of Tomorrow ..."; Transliteration: "Sono Ashita no Undīne ni ..." (Japanese: その 明日のウンディーネに...)	10 September 2006
On a rainy day, Akari and Alice visit Aika's room for a group study instead of gondola practice. When Akira greets them, they are watched by two of Akira's colleagues, and Aika takes this as a one more sign her improving skills are being noticed within the company. The trainees study for a while, but when they start dreaming about what titles they will take as Primas, Akira gives them paperwork to sort. When Aika returns the completed paperwork, she eavesdrops on the same colleagues and learns they aren't talking about her but badmouthing Akira, saying she's stuck-up because she's one of the Three Great Water Fairies. She returns to her room, upset, and tells Akari and Alice. Akira overhears her and tells them that backbiting is inevitable in the competitive world of undines, and must be accepted as another part of the job. When Aika complains that it's frustrating, Akira says that for some reason, people always remember the one bad thing that happens amid all the good, and you need to take neither for granted. She opens the window shutters and reveals that it has stopped raining. The trainees conclude they must grow stronger to become Primas.
25	"The Fruits of That Encounter ..."; Transliteration: "Sono Deai no Kesshō wa ..." (Japanese: その 出逢いの結晶は...)	17 September 2006
A week before Festa del Redentore, marking the start of autumn, Akari worries because she hasn't received any e-mail from Ai for a while. Akira, Alicia, and Athena give the trainees the assignment of hosting a Redentore houseboat, including all of the planning and decorating, as a way of practicing their entertainment skills. Alice quickly designs invitations, which makes Akari and Aika more enthusiastic about the task. Akari invites Ai, despite not hearing whether she will visit Aqua for Redentore as once planned. The three work hard through the week, and the night of the festival, all the guests arrive but Ai, who still hasn't responded. Just as the boat is pulling away, Ai arrives at the dock, saying she hadn't replied because she wanted to surprise Akari. Their dinner is a success, and after the table is cleared away, the conversation lapses into a silence that Akari calls peaceful, shortly before the midnight fireworks. In the end, the guests toast their hosts in thanks for bringing them together.
26	"That White, Kind City ..."; Transliteration: "Sono Masshiro na Yuki no Naka de..." (Japanese: その 真っ白な雪の中で...)	24 September 2006
On the first snowy day of winter, Akari asks Aika and Alice during a break in practice what, as children, they wanted to be like when they grew up, but they come to no conclusions. Later, as Alicia and Akari go for a walk through the snow-bound city, Akari asks Alicia what she wanted to be like when she grew up. Alicia stops to think, then begins rolling a snowball. With the help of several passers-by in succession, it grows to be almost as large as they are tall, and their helpers thank them for the fun. They end up in a dead-end square, where the residents start a second snowball, then a third to make a complete snowman, which they all decorate together. As they walk home, Alicia finally answers Akari's question by saying that when she was a child, she noticed that when you start rolling a snowball, someone always helps, leaving everyone satisfied and happy—and decided that she wanted to be an adult who helps people be satisfied and happy in other ways. Back home, when Alicia asks what Akari wanted to be, she says a fairy, and Alicia replies she will be one soon.

== "Aria the OVA: Arietta" ==
A single-episode OVA titled "Aria the OVA: Arietta" was released 21 September 2007 and broadcast on AT-X on 2 September 2007. The script was written by director Jun'ichi Satō. The opening theme is "Nanairo no Sora o" (七色の空を) by Sonorous and the ending theme is "Ashita, Yūgure Made" (明日、夕暮れまで) by Erino Hazuki. It is 30 minutes in length. The logo for the OVA is colored orange.

A dubbed version of the OVA was broadcast in Korea by Animax on 24 December 2007. In France, Kaze is scheduled to release the OVA as promotional material for the publication of volume 8 of the Aria manga. In North America, it was released as part of the season box set of Aria the Origination by The Right Stuf International under its Nozomi Entertainment imprint on 16 March 2010.

Title	Original air date
"Aria the OVA: Arietta" (Japanese: アリア ジ オーブイエー ~アリエッタ~)	21 September 2007
After Akari dreams she's a Prima in charge of Aria Company after Alicia's departure, nervously coaching Ai as a new Pair as well as another Single, she spends the day pensive. That evening, Alicia tells her about being a new Prima herself, shown in a flashback: After Grandma Akino retires, Alicia initially doesn't have the confidence to teach another undine, even after Akira has taken on Aika as a Pair. One evening Akira takes Alicia up the Campanile to see the view at sunset, and tells her this wonder is something undines must pass on to not only customers but the next generation of undines. Alicia agrees and hires a new Pair from Manhome—Akari. In the present, Akari asks how Alicia came to choose her, but Alicia says that's a secret. At Alicia's suggestion, that night they go to the Campanile after visiting hours. As they climb the tower, they hold hands, and Alicia thanks Akari for being the sort of student who shows her teacher new wonders, and for giving her confidence. As they look down at the lights of the nighttime city, Akari decides to treasure her remaining time with Alicia.

== Aria the Origination (season 3) ==
The third season of Aria of 13 episodes was broadcast on TV Tokyo Network stations and AT-X from 7 January 2008 to 31 March 2008, plus a bonus episode released only on DVD. The production staff remained largely unchanged from previous seasons. The opening theme is "Spirale" (スピラーレ) by Yui Makino, and the ending themes are "Kin no Nami Sen no Nami" (金の波 千の波) by Akino Arai for episodes 1–12 and "Undine" (ウンディーネ) by Yui Makino for episode 13. The logo for this season is colored violet. The episodes were released in Japan on seven DVDs between 25 April 2008 and 24 October 2008, along with a "Special Navigation" OVA, numbered as episode 5.5, which used "Torikago no Yume" (鳥かごの夢) by Akino Arai as its ending theme.

In France, Kaze began broadcasting subtitled episodes of the third season on 2 June 2008 through Video on Demand, and released DVD box set on 26 November 2008. In North America, was released as a season box set of subtitled episodes by The Right Stuf International under its Nozomi Entertainment imprint on 16 March 2010. In Italy, the series is licensed by Yamato Video.

No.	Title	Original air date
1	"That Imminent Spring Breeze ..."; Transliteration: "Sono Yagate Otozureru Haru no Kaze ni ..." (Japanese: その やがて訪れる春の風に...)	7 January 2008
During their first practice after Carnevale, Alice speculates that Akari and Aika will take the Prima exam soon, but Akari is uncertain as she doubts her own skills after watching Alicia. Alicia receives a package of jam from satisfied Carnevale customers and invites Akira, Athena, Aika, and Alice to tea to share it. In a flashback, Akari tells the others how Alicia impressed the customers (and Akari) by accurately predicting when snow would start falling. In flashbacks, Aika describes how Akira saved a dancing customer from falling out of the gondola, and Alice how Athena stopped a toddler's tantrum by making funny faces. The three trainees admit they have a long way to go as undines, and their mentors tell them they themselves have more to learn, saying that if you're ever satisfied with your performance, you will never improve—the best thing to do is cherish the fact that there's more to learn and have fun along the way. On the balcony afterward, the trainees recall that this last was Grandma Akino's advice, and from inside their mentors watch them and conclude that their students will be wonderful undines, like none seen before in Neo-Venezia.
2	"That Smiling Customer ..."; Transliteration: "Sono Egao no Okyakusama wa ..." (Japanese: その 笑顔のお客さまは...)	14 January 2008
An older woman, Amarantha, requests a tour from Akari, who stays up late planning her route. At next morning's practice, Aika suggests the commission is suspicious, and Alice speculates it's an inspector from the Gondola Association. When Amarantha arrives, she requests Akari show her the Neo-Venezia that only she can. Aika and Alice follow them secretly. Akari takes Amarantha to a spot where a statue appears to cradle the floating climate-control island, and the woman shows her an even better vantage where two statues seem to hold it up together. Throughout the tour, Amarantha is shown knowing more about the city than Akari, and when Akari ends it by taking her to an abandoned monastery garden that ran wild after the water rose, Amarantha has Akari go through a door that leads to another flooded courtyard covered by a wisteria in bloom. Akari is disappointed to learn that Amarantha already knew everything she's been shown, but Amarantha thanks her for a tour that showed the Neo-Venezia she loves. Aika and Alice are discovered, and Alicia tells the trainees that Amarantha likes to test Singles, and once tested herself, Akira, and Athena as Singles.
3	"Those Feelings Within ..."; Transliteration: "Sono Komerareta Omoi o ..." (Japanese: その こめられた想いを...)	21 January 2008
During a study session, Akari learns that the interior decor of Caffè Florian was transported entire from Venice, and mentions she's never been inside despite knowing the owner. They visit during a break, and spot a candy-seller's cart in the Piazza San Marco. When a boy trips and drops his candy, the seller gives him a replacement bottle, but Akari still feels sorry for the chocolates spilled on the ground. Inside the cafe, Akari is impressed by the art. Some time later, Akari sees the candy-seller looking at the renovations to the Ca' d'Oro, and is disappointed he hasn't been selling since that first day. One morning Akari meets him outside the Piazza cafe, where he begins selling again, and he thanks her for her chance remark about the spilled chocolate, which reminded him of how he once wanted to give his customers joy, and says that after wandering the city's sights he figured out better packaging for his sweets. He treats her to a latte, and Akari realizes that Caffè Florian's art contains their creators' feelings, just like his chocolates, and the latter bring just as much beauty to the Neo-Venezia.
4	"Those Who Aim for Tomorrow ..."; Transliteration: "Sono Ashita o Mezasu Monotachi wa ..." (Japanese: その 明日を目指すものたちは...)	28 January 2008
To get more gondola practice while Alicia is busy, Akari works on the traghetto ferry for the first time. One of the three Singles she's teamed with, Atora, gives her a candy to calm her nerves and says she can observe from the shore for a while. Another, Anzu, is gloomy and Atora tells Akari it's because she recently failed the Prima exam yet again. Anzu says that while she's depressed at the moment, she hasn't given up, and Akari tells her she thinks Alicia hasn't tested her yet because of her own lack of skill. When Akari takes a turn rowing, the other three realize she's actually very good, capable of balancing the traghetto with its standing passengers on her own. At the end of the day, they praise her rowing ability and tell her she'll be a Prima soon. Atora tells Anzu they all should be Primas and criticizes their examiner at Orange Planet as too strict. After talking about how discouraging it was to fail the exam six months ago, with the encouragement of the others, Atora agrees to take the exam again.
5	"That Keepsake Clover ..."; Transliteration: "Sono Omoide no Kurōbā wa ..." (Japanese: そのおもいでのクローバーは...)	5 February 2008
During practice, Aika sees Akari chat easily with many acquaintances and Alice row with her exceptional skill, then watches Athena's singing make passers-by stop to listen and Alicia gracefully catch a hat blown by the wind. Alice calls their mentors' talents the sorts one can only be born with, which disturbs Aika. While helping Akira clean her room, Aika finds a photo of Akira as a Single with Athena and Alicia as Primas, and demands to know how she could smile despite being promoted last. Akira says that of course it was hard having such talented friends, and tells a story, shown in a flashback: After Athena's promotion, while worrying about being left behind, Akira unsuccessfully searches a clover bed for a four-leaf clover with the help a child who turns out to be Aika. The child then says if there's nothing there, you have to make up for it your own way and adds a rose petal to a three-leaf clover to make four leaves, and Akira concludes she has to make up for her talent through hard work. In the present, Akira gives Aika the clover keepsake as a good-luck charm for becoming a Prima, and Aika returns to practice with renewed determination.
5.5	"That Little Secret Place ..."; Transliteration: "Sono Choppiri Himitsu no Basho ni ..." (Japanese: その ちょっぴり秘密の場所に...)	25 June 2008 (OVA)
On her day off, Akari goes for a walk with President Aria through a residential neighborhood of Neo-Venezia. After lunch in a cafe, as they head back toward the Piazza, they are spotted by Akatsuki, who follows them to greet Akari. After losing track of her several times, he finally sees her on a balcony of the Basilica di San Marco. As he runs into the Basilica after her, he's spotted by Aika and Alice. On the balcony, Akari is pleased that no one has discovered her secret place. After some searching, Akatsuki finds the inconspicuous staircase up to the balcony. Akari tells him she comes to meet a man who always stares over the Piazza at the sea, watching the ever-changing world: a bust on the balustrade. Akatsuki promises to keep the place just their secret, but they are interrupted by Aika and Alice, who followed him up. Akari decides that this has become everyone's secret place.
6	"That Wonderful Extracurricular Lesson ..."; Transliteration: "Sono Kagai Jugyō ni ..." (Japanese: その課外授業に...)	12 February 2008
When Aika berates Akari for not taking practice seriously, saying at this rate Alicia will scold her, Akari says Alicia has never scolded her, nor even gotten angry. This startles Alice and to learn why she begins stalking Alicia—inventing lame excuses when she gets caught—but can't figure it out. After a week, Alice meets Alicia at a cafe and at Alicia's prompting asks her directly. In response, Alicia asks President Aria to give a candy to a girl at another table, and they watch him get distracted by sparrows and the waiter before finally succeeding, for which Alicia praises him. She then has him deliver another candy to another customer and praises him for being even faster. Alicia explains that criticizing people makes them fear making mistakes, and so she prefers encouragement over correction. She then says that if President Aria had continued making mistakes, she would have reflected on how she was instructing him wrong, and that teaching and being taught are very much alike.
7	"In That Gently Passing Time ..."; Transliteration: "Sono Yuruyaka na Toki no Naka ni ..." (Japanese: そのゆるやかな時の中に...)	19 February 2008
On the anniversary of Aria Company's founding, Akari and Alicia visit one of its former Primas, Anna, on Neo-Burano Island. Alicia tells Akari how Anna fell in love with a fisherman named Alberto who was visiting the city. Anna admits she was lonely, the first few years on an island where she knew no one, but says eventually she met other women through lace-making. Grandma Akino arrives as a surprise visitor for dinner. After dinner, Grandma tells the story, shown in a flashback, of when she, then Himeya Company's undisputed top Prima for 14 years, first meets President Aria on a seawall staring out at the water. She tries talking to him several times, but doesn't find out what he is waiting for. On a rainy night, she finds him still sitting and shelters him with her umbrella through the night, and as the sun rises she realizes it had been the first time in a while she had spent time just sitting. After this, she founds Aria Company with him, in order to continue seeing the world through his eyes. In the present, Grandma and Alicia tell Akari they look forward to seeing "her" Aria Company starting soon.
8	"The Memories of That Precious Person ..."; Transliteration: "Sono Taisetsu na Hito no Kioku ni ..." (Japanese: その大切な人の記憶に...)	25 February 2008
Alice tells Akari and Aika she won't be at practice tomorrow because she invited Athena on a picnic. That night Alice makes elaborate preparations, but in the morning Athena leaves for work at dawn without speaking with her. When Athena finally returns, in her disappointment Alice snaps at her then accidentally rips the invitation, and in the ensuing fuss Athena slips and falls. Alice calls Akari and Alicia for help in a panic, and when they arrive, they learn that Athena has amnesia from hitting her head and cannot remember anyone around her. As they talk, her memories slowly come back, starting with President Aria and Alicia. To further jog her memories, they take her to familiar places, and by the end of the day she remembers everyone but Alice. When Athena asks what she was to Alice, the latter breaks down in tears, and Alicia makes Athena reveal she'd been faking amnesia to find out how Alice feels about her.
9	"Surrounded by That Orange Wind ..."; Transliteration: "Sono Orenji no Kaze ni Tsutsumarete ..." (Japanese: その オレンジの風につつまれて...)	3 March 2008
When Alice graduates from middle school, she's happy that she can now spend more time practicing with Aika and Akari. Athena invites Alice on a picnic on a canal through the countryside outside Neo-Venezia, and has Alice treat her as a customer. Athena praises Alice's skills as an undine, and Alice responds that she is training with an excellent mentor. As they pass through a lock, Alice is startled when an undine wishes her good luck. While waiting for the lock to fill, Alice tells Athena that she's confident in all of her undine skills except singing canzone, and Athena tells her conveying a love for singing is more important than any technical skill. When they reach the Hill of Hope, the destination of the Single promotion exam, Akari, Aika, the owners of Orange Planet, and a representative from the Gondola Association are waiting for them. After an exam on canzone, Athena takes off both of Alice's gloves, promoting her straight from Pair to Prima (the first undine ever to do so), and gives her the title Orange Princess.
10	"The Excitement on That Moon-Gazing Night ..."; Transliteration: "Sono Otsukimi no Yoru no Tokimeki wa ..." (Japanese: その お月見の夜のときめきは...)	10 March 2008
Akari and Aika secretly observe Alice during her first day as a Prima, and when Alice asks how she was, Aika says she looked as stiff as a toy robot. To cheer Alice up, Akari invites her over for autumn moon-gazing. That night, Akari introduces her friends to Japanese Tsukimi customs, and Alice thanks her for helping her relax. When Al runs late, Alice teases Aika about inviting him, and Aika goes off flustered to find him. After they meet, Aika falls into a dry well, and when Al tries to pull her up he is pulled down instead, trapping them both. They are found by Maa, whom they send back to Alice for help. While waiting for rescue, they talk about Aqua's two moons, gravitation, and attraction, and it becomes apparent they are both attracted to each other. Akari and Alice eventually rescue them, and as they walk back to Aria Company, Al takes Aika's hand.
11	"Those Ever-Changing Days ..."; Transliteration: "Sono Kawariyuku Hibi ni ..." (Japanese: その 変わりゆく日々に...)	17 March 2008
Two weeks after Alice's promotion to Prima, Akira hears some Himeya Singles gossip about how Aika, the heir to the company, is handling "losing" to a competitor. Akira worries over whether Aika is holding up, but has difficulty talking about it with her until Aika mentions she was present at Alice's promotion. Aika assures Akira she's been motivated by the competition and asks to be trained hard. Akira sets the date for Aika's Prima exam in a month, and says she won't forgive her if she, as the company's future queen, fails. Meanwhile, Alice is settling into her working life as an undine, but has little free time. She realizes it's been several days since she last saw Akari and Aika, at the moon-gazing, but can think of no excuse to call her friends, although she misses them and is lonely. When Akari and Aika pay a surprise visit with a pizza, Akari tells Alice that being a friend is reason enough.
12	"Embraced by That Blue Sea and Wind ..."; Transliteration: "Sono Aoi Umi to Kaze no Naka de ..." (Japanese: その 蒼い海と風の中で...)	24 March 2008
Akari tells Aika that practice has gotten lonely without Alice, and Aika apologizes that she can't practice either anymore: she's been promoted to Prima, with the title Rosen Queen, and will be managing a new Himeya Company branch office. When Akari tells Alicia, she wonders why Aika cried over this, and in response Alicia sets Akari's Prima exam for the next day. That night, Akari is too nervous to sleep and practices rowing until very late. In the morning it's raining, but Akari asks that the exam not be postponed, and by afternoon it has cleared enough to hold it. As Akari guides Alicia through the city, a number of friends greet her, and Akatsuki and Woody cheer her on from the Rialto Bridge. Alicia directs Akari down a very narrow, difficult channel, which she successfully negotiates, then gives Akari the choice of their final destination, which will determine what kind of Prima she'll be. Akari takes her to Aria Company, where Alicia thanks Akari for coming into her life and takes off Akari's glove, promoting her to Prima with the title Aquamarine, then says she has something important to tell her.
13	"To That New Beginning ..."; Transliteration: "Sono Atarashii Hajimari ni ..." (Japanese: その 新しいはじまりに...)	31 March 2008
The next morning, Aika, Alice, and Akatsuki demand to know whether the news about Alicia is true, and Akari says yes, Alicia is retiring to get married and work for the Gondola Association. Alicia had delayed this until Akari became a Prima, and Akari blames herself for not becoming more reliable before now. Aika and Alice worry about Akari, but she says she'll be fine. The next several days are busy, as Alicia hands the running of Aria Company over to Akari. When Akari eventually breaks down crying, Alicia admits that Akari has long had the skills to be a Prima but she'd delayed the exam because she didn't want to leave Akari. Mr. Mailman, now retired himself, hires Akari for a tour, during which he offers to refer customers to her. At Alicia's retirement ceremony, all the undines of the city participate. The following morning, Akari sees Aria Company filled with memories of Alicia and her friends, then opens the reception-area shutter to let in her new beginning. In an afterword, Akari tells Ai what happens to the other characters—including Athena becoming an opera singer, leaving Akira the undisputed top Prima—ending with Ai's first morning as a new Pair for Aria Company.

== Aria the Avvenire ==
Aria the Avvenire is a 3-episode series produced for the "Ao no Curtain Call" project. It celebrates the 10th anniversary of the broadcast of the first Aria TV series.

No.	Title	Original release date
1	"To You, Who I Wanted to Meet ..."; Transliteration: "Sono Aitakatta Anata ni ..." (Japanese: その 逢いたかったあなたに ...)	24 December 2015
Ai is a Single and she goes with Akari to practice skulling. During practice they intersect with Aika and Alice, who are skulling with their own students. After they pass, Akari relates a memory: Akira comes to the company house to give a present to Alicia for her half-Martian-birthday, but Alicia isn't there. Akari convinces Akira to "practice" with the intent of finding Alicia out and about. Akari eventually admits her visit wasn't about the present but just about seeing Alicia and Athena. Just after, Akari and Akira intersect with both Alicia and Athena. Akira throws the present to Alicia. After, she agrees with Akari that maybe it was a miracle to see the others.
2	"That Warm Goodbye ..."; Transliteration: "Sono Atataka na Sayonara wa ..." (Japanese: その 暖かなさよならは ...)	23 March 2016
Akari returns to the company house to Ai who proclaims a miracle. Ai was out practicing alone when she spots the shadow of a cat she thinks is Cait Sith. She leaves her gondola to chase and runs into Azusa and Anya, both Singles who are the students of Aika and Alice, who are trying to find a blue-eyed cat to be the new president at Himeya's main branch. She joins them in their search, but they fail to find it and end up at Florian, where Ai asks if she can practice with them. They say yes and the story ends. Then Akari remembers the last time she saw Cait Sith. Akari, Aika, and Alice were discussing that maybe becoming adults makes it impossible to see Cait Sith. Alice suggests visiting the Stone of Misfortune, which people avoid stepping on. Alice steps on it and nothing happens, then Aika and Alice leave. Akari steps on it and is teleported far above Neo-Venezia. Falling through the air, she encounters Cait Sith for the last time. She wakes up in her gondola with President Aria and a pendant gifted to her by Cait Sith. In the present, Aria and Ai finish talking about miracles.
3	"To That Far Away Future ..."; Transliteration: "Sono Haruka naru Mirai e ..." (Japanese: その 遙かなる未来へ ...)	24 June 2016
In the past, Alicia opens Aria Company for the day. She sets out advertisements for an apprentice. Akari reaches out by email and phone and says she thinks Alicia was calling out to her. They meet for the first time. In the present, Ai, Azusa, and Anya discuss their mentors. They return to practice and discuss the things they don't know and how the Prima system developed. They see Alice and then discuss how Alice wanted to see Athena's performance, but couldn't. Ai proposes to make a miracle happen. Ai wakes up to an Acqua Alta and declines Akari's day off, saying she is busy. Later, Akari thinks to herself that she'd like to see everyone. Ai then invites her to an engagement. The engagement is a tea party. Ai, Azusa, and Anya are there when Akari arrives. Then Alice and Aika arrive, then Grandma, Alicia, and Akira. Athena had a last minute engagement and could not come. Grandma talks about how it was a miracle that made the company and the friends at the table. Alicia falls asleep at the table, as she's been busy trying to change the Prima system. Alicia dreams of the many events portrayed earlier in the series and what Akari means to her as well as the things Akari taught her. When Alicia wakes up, they talk about how they wanted to see Athena. Eventually they see her singing from another rooftop and all agree the day was a miracle. Akari, Aika, and Alice remember their promotions to Prima.

== Aria the Crepuscolo ==
Aria the Crepuscolo is a film originally announced on 14 April 2020 to celebrate the series' 15th anniversary as part of the "Blue Curtain Call". It premiered on 5 March 2021. It was produced by J.C.Staff and directed by Takahiro Natori, with the main staff members reprising their roles.

Anya and Athena meet in the city while Athena is looking for Alice, who she happened to hear singing. Later, Anya and Azusa bring lunch to the Aria company house, where they and Ai discuss another surprise party with Akari to include Athena. Anya thinks Alice has been avoiding Athena. Akari attempts to explain it away as Alice overthinking. Akari suggests giving them the opportunity to talk it out. They originally agree to a party during Redentore, but later Azusa remembers that Anya, Azusa, and Ai have been volunteered to help with a party by Himeya. That evening, Alice sits at home remembering her first meeting with Athena. The next day, Ai, Anya, and Azusa go to find places with memories. While searching, Anya meets a childhood friend Aletta, practicing to be a Sylph. They talk about why they wanted to be a Sylph and an Undine. That evening, Alice and Anya, when Alice talks about how she thinks she's been a failure as a mentor and how Athena was not. She recounts a memory of a Halloween-like holiday she celebrated with Akari and Aika, though she wasn't excited about it until Athena helped her by granting her her wish to be the princess of the Soap Bubble Kingdom, with Akari and Aika.

Redentore arrives. Akari clarifies to a confused Akatsuki that there won't be a house boat party since the others are busy. Azusa, Ai, and Anya are at the Himeya party as servers. Athena's concert is that day but Alice wasn't able to see it. That evening at the Himeya party after the customers have left, Akari, Aika, and the former servers wait for Alice and Athena to arrive to the party, which Akira and Alicia arrive to. At the concert hall, Athena remembers when several Singles were gossiping about Alice. Then she remembers a time when Alice expressed her insecurities. Athena tells her she isn't the only one with insecurities. In the present, Alicia and Akira convey how clumsy at relationships they think Alice and Athena are. Alice arrives at the concert hall to see Athena. Athena asks if Alice is mad at her. Athena relays several memories where Athena did not know how to deal with Alice's promotion to Prima and that she wanted more time with Alice, as well as the promotion test itself from her point of view. Athena thinks that she might have done Alice wrong by promoting her. The rest of the girls arrive and say that Athena, Alice, and Anya were acting weird. Akari particularly got them together. Athena had Alicia invite Alice because she didn't want to make Alice angry. Alice conveys her insecurity about mentoring Anya. Alice's response to Athena's memories of the promotion is that Alice had no idea that Athena was thinking about those things. Alice expresses thanks that Athena treated her with kindness rather than severity in readying her for the exam. Then Alice and Athena sing. Alice remembers a time when she followed Athena, not knowing who she was, and Anya remembers following both of them. Alice says that's when she knew she wanted to be an Undine. Alice tells Anya that she doesn't have to force herself to be the perfect mentor, and Anya responds in kind. Alice and Athena continue singing, which draws a crowd. After, Aika, Alice, and Akari are driving their gondolas with their mentors and students in the boat, as well as Grandma. They thank Anya for bringing them all together that day.

== Aria the Benedizione ==
Aria the Benedizione is the third and final installment of the "Blue Curtain Call". It was announced just after the release of Crepuscolo. The cast and staff from the previous film reprised their roles. On 10 August 2021, two new cast members were revealed and the release date of 3 December 2021 was announced.

Anya, Ai, and Azusa are practicing. They pass Akira, who is behaving strangely; they follow her in secret until she catches them. She tells them to follow her to the Undine Museum. They meet the curator Asuka, a former "legendary" Undine for Himeya. Outside, Aria is out with customers and passes a repair shop with a gondola from Himeya. Akari's customers say they couldn't get an appointment with Akira. In the museum, the girls are told that that gondola is the only gondola remaining since Himeya began. It last belonged to Aika's mother. Akira says that Aika isn't planning to inherit it. Azusa doesn't understand why and Akira and Asuka say they intend to retire the gondola. At dinner, Ai and Akari talk about how gondolas are burned for their retirement. At Himeya, Azusa confronts Aika about the gondola, who confirms she will not inherit it. She thinks it is cursed.

The next day at the cafe, Azusa, Ai, and Anya ask Akira about the curse. Akira relates how she came to know Aika, who was a troublesome student. Akira followed her around until Aika falls asleep. Akira wakes her and they discuss Aika's behavior. Aika is not confident in herself and then runs off. In the present, Azusa, Ai, and Anya think it may be the lack of confidence that is causing Aika not to inherit the gondola. They go to Aria company and conceive a plan to ask Aika with Akari.

The next day, Asuka reserves time with Azusa, Ai, and Anya on Aika's gondola. Aika ponders their scheming. Asuka thinks that Aika stopped smiling when Akira became a Prima which is when she started mentoring Aika. Aika says that she appreciated learning from Akira. Asuka says that the museum will preserve the gondola, and then tells Aika to go to the repair shop. Akira is waiting there for a private retirement ceremony. Akira continues her earlier story. She followed Aika and asked her if she was running away from her responsibilities and invites her onto the gondola. Aika again falls asleep. When she wakes, she discovers Akira rowed the entire night. Aika conveys her anxieties around inheriting the company and becoming an Undine. She was inspired by her first meeting with Alicia. Akira tells her just to try and that will be enough to become an Undine. Akira had earlier discussed with Aika's mother that she would do her best to help Aika become one. Akira and Aika end up at Aria company, where Alicia gives her a hair cut. Aika is embarrassed to meet Alicia again. After leaving, Aika announces she will become an Undine.

In the present, Akari and Alice have also arrived. Anya points out that there was no curse in the story so far. Aika then tells the story about her Prima promotion exam. At the end of the exam, she tells Akira that she's not happy with the exam itself and wanted Akira to recognize her as part of the exam. Akira sets a new exam to begin at night the day after. In the present, Athena and Alicia arrive. In the memory, Akira will run from Aika, who must steal a rose from Akira without leaving the gondola, and Aika must do it before sunrise. This is in parallel to the night they first interacted. Aika catches Akira just as the sun rises, where Akira became Prima herself. Aika rows them both to where they would have ended with the original exam, and Akira asks Aika to confirm she wants to become a Prima. Aika says that she started by wanting to be Alicia, but that she now wants to be a person who makes being normal something extraordinary. Akira subsequently promotes her.

In the present, Al arrives. The curse was ultimately that Aika had no attachment to the history of the gondola. She does not want to use the legend, she wants to become one herself. Akira hugs her.

== See also ==
- List of Aria chapters
- List of Aria soundtracks
