= Ariadne no Dangan =

- Also known as: Team Batista 3 Ariadne no Dangan
- Genre: Medical Drama, Mystery
- Starring: Atsushi Itō; Tōru Nakamura; Katsunori Takahashi; Manami Konishi
- Ending theme: Ariadne no ito (Do As Infinity)
- Composers: Takeshi Senoo; Kei Haneoka
- Original language: Japanese
- No. of episodes: 11

Production
- Producers: Yoko Toyofuku; Kōichi Toda; Kaoru Yamaki
- Production location: Tokyo
- Running time: 54 min./episode

Original release
- Network: Fuji TV
- Release: July 12 – September 20, 2011

Ariadne no Dangan (アリアドネの弾丸, Ariadone no dangan) is a TV series broadcast in Japan by Fuji TV. It is the sequel to Team Batista no Eiko and General Rouge no Gaisen.

== Cast ==
- Atsushi Itō as Kōhei Taguchi
- Tōru Nakamura as Keisuke Shiratori
- Katsunori Takahashi as Yoshimasa Ikaruga
- Manami Konishi as Sumire Sasai
- Toshinori Omi as Joichiro Kitayama
- Seiji Fukushi as Soichi Usami
- Yasuhi Nakamura as Makoto Tamamura
- Ken Yasuda as Goro Shimazu
- Tomohiro Ichikawa as Shuusuke Suga
- Go Riju as Daisuke Mifune
- Yuko Natori as Makoto Fujiwara
- Ryuzo Hayashi as Gonta Takashina
- Jinta Nishizawa as Hiroki Kanda
- Toshihiro Yashiba – Yuichi Tomono
- Naomasa Musaka – Yukio Matsuzaki
- Kenta Satoi – Yagami

=== Guest appearances ===
- Kazumasa Taguchi – Kiyohara Masao (ep1)
- Hideo Ishiguro – Kiyohara Shinichi (ep1)
- Michiko Ameku – Ichiko Taniguchi (ep2)
- Yasuhito Hida – Katsuya Oda (ep2)
- Yasuyuki Maekawa – Coroner (ep2)
- Etsuko Seki – Shizue Taniguchi (ep2)
- Daikichi Sugawara – Takahiro Nakano (ep4)
- Toshihide Tonesaku – Shuichi Kojima (ep4)
- Aki Nishihara – Misa Sugiyama (ep4)
- Sanae Miyata – Tomoko Sugiyama (ep4)
- Kayo Ise – Kaori Miyata (ep4)
- Senji Takeuchi – Kazuo Sugiyama (ep4)
- Hajime Okayama – Dr.Nojima (ep7)
- Ai Kato – Haruka Izumi (ep8)
- Takayuki Kinoshita (TKO) – Shinji Sato (ep8)
- Masahiro Komoto – Etsuro Ino (ep8-9)
- Takeshi Masu – Ken Ozaki (ep8-9)
- Chiemi Toi – Yuka Mitani (ep8-9)
- Isamu Ichikawa – Prof. Yamaoka (ep9)

== Episode information ==
Episode	Title	Writer	Director	Original airdate	Ratings (Kanto)	Ratings (Kansai)
Stage 1	Shinfuzen torikku no nazo (心不全トリックの謎)	Noriko Goto	Kazuhisa Imai	July 12, 2011; 22.10 - 23.13	14.2%	18.0%
Stage 1-2	Ai ga minogashita satsui (Aiが見逃した殺意)	Noriko Goto	Kazuhisa Imai	July 19, 2011; 22.00 - 22.54	11.6%	
Stage 1-3	Itsuwari no shibō jikoku (偽りの死亡時刻)	Noriko Goto	Kazunari Hoshino	July 26, 2011; 22.00 - 22.54	12.0%	
Stage 1-4	Futarime no Fushinshi (2人目の不審死)	Noriko Goto	Takashi Komatsu	August 2, 2011; 22.00 - 22.54	11.3%	14.6%
Stage 2-1	Jokaibōi no Fukushū (女解剖医の復讐)	Tanaka Shinichi	Takashi Komatsu	August 9, 2011; 22.00 - 22.54	12.5%	
Stage 2-2	Kanzen hanzai no melody (完全犯罪のメロディー)	Noriko Goto	Kazunari Hoshino	August 16, 2011; 22.00 - 22.54	11.6%	
Stage 2-3	Shin-hannin (真犯人)	Noriko Goto	Takashi Komatsu	August 23, 2011; 22.00 - 22.54	13.5%	
Stage 2-4	Kantsū (貫通)	Noriko Goto	Kazunari Hoshino	August 30, 2011; 22.00 - 22.54	12.3%	
Stage 3-1	20-nenme no Saihan (20年目の再犯)	Tanaka Shinichi	Kazunari Hoshino	September 6, 2011; 22.00 - 22.54	12.2%	
Stage 3-2	Ten to Sen (点と線)	Noriko Goto	Takashi Komatsu	September 12, 2011; 22.00 - 22.54	14.1%	
Final Stage	Sayonara Batista Combi! Satsujin Meikyū kara no Kyushutsu (さよならバチスタコンビ!殺人迷宮からの救出)	Noriko Goto	Takashi Komatsu	September 20, 2011; 22.10 - 23.14	15.4%	17.7%
