= Sweet Little Lies (2010 film) =

- Film poster
- Directed by: Hitoshi Yazaki
- Written by: Kaori Ekuni (novel); Kyoko Inukai
- Starring: Miki Nakatani; Nao Ōmori; Mei Kurokawa
- Music by: Takeshi Senoo
- Release date: March 13, 2010
- Country: Japan
- Language: Japanese

Sweet Little Lies (スイートリトルライズ) is a 2010 Japanese film directed by Hitoshi Yazaki, based on a novel by Kaori Ekuni.

== Cast ==
- Miki Nakatani
- Nao Ōmori
- Mei Kurokawa
- Chizuru Ikewaki
- Yuko Oshima
- Sakura Ando
- Mei Kurokawa
