= Takeshi Senoo =

Japanese composer (born 1969)

Takeshi Senoo (妹尾 武) (born December 26, 1969) is a Japanese composer. He has worked on several different anime shows, including the Aria series, Inari, Konkon, Koi Iroha, and the Himawari! series. Along with Shigeharu Sasago he was music director of the Aria soundtracks, which he composed with Choro Club. He also co-composed the music for the live action series Ariadne no Dangan and produced the soundtrack for the film Sweet Little Lies.

== Works ==
- Aria the Animation
- Ariadne no Dangan
- Inari, Konkon, Koi Iroha
- Himawari!
- Sweet Little Lies
- School Lunch of Ashiya City (2022)
