= Erino Hazuki =

Japanese voice actress

Erino Hazuki (葉月 絵理乃, Hazuki Erino; born August 3) is a Japanese voice actress who works for Aksent. On February 24, 2014, she announced that she had been married around December 2013.

== Filmography ==
2002

- Seven of Seven - Erino Kogarashi
- Princess Tutu - Malen and Uzura

2004

- SD Gundam Force - Core

2005

- Aria the Animation - Akari Mizunashi

2006

- Aria the Natural - Akari Mizunashi
- Kiba - Aisha, Elmeyda, Frea, Jure, Mia
- Tonagura! - Marie Kagura

2007

- Aria the OVA ~Arietta~ - Akari Mizunashi
- Blue Dragon - Kluke
- Darker than Black - Mayuko (episode 13)
- Night Wizard the Animation - Longinus (episode 7)

2008

- Aria the Origination - Akari Mizunashi

2009

- Maria Holic - Maki Natsuru
- Akaneiro ni Somaru Saka - Mikoto Tachibana
- Kyo no Gononi - Haruka Tanaka

2010

- Hanamaru Kindergarten - Nanako Yamamoto
- Uragiri wa Boku no Namae wo Shitteiru - Shiori Yoshino
