= Aria (manga) =

Japanese manga series by Kozue Amano and its franchise

- Cover of Aria volume 1 as published by Mag Garden, featuring Akari Mizunashi
- Genre: Fantasy, iyashikei, science fiction
- Manga

Aqua
- Written by: Kozue Amano
- Published by: Enix (former); Mag Garden (current)
- English publisher: NA: Tokyopop
- Magazine: Monthly Stencil
- Original run: 27 January 2001 – 28 September 2001
- Volumes: 2
- Manga
- Written by: Kozue Amano
- Published by: Mag Garden
- English publisher: NA: ADV Manga (former); Tokyopop (current)
- Magazine: Monthly Comic Blade
- Original run: 28 February 2002 – 29 February 2008
- Volumes: 12
- Anime television series

Aria the Animation
- Directed by: Junichi Sato; Kazuyoshi Fuseki (Assistant)
- Produced by: Tetsuo Uchida; Shigeru Tateishi; Yasutaka Hiuga
- Written by: Junichi Sato
- Music by: Choro Club; Takeshi Senoo
- Studio: Hal Film Maker
- Licensed by: AUS: Siren Visual; NA: Nozomi Entertainment; UK: MVM Films
- Original network: TXN (TV Tokyo)
- Original run: 5 October 2005 – 28 December 2005
- Episodes: 13
- Anime television series

Aria the Natural
- Directed by: Junichi Sato; Kenichi Takeshita (Assistant)
- Produced by: Hisao Iizuka; Tetsuo Uchida; Shinsaku Hatta; Shinya Tagashira
- Written by: Junichi Sato
- Music by: Choro Club; Takeshi Senoo
- Studio: Hal Film Maker
- Licensed by: NA: Nozomi Entertainment; UK: MVM Films
- Original network: TXN (TV Tokyo)
- Original run: 2 April 2006 – 26 September 2006
- Episodes: 26
- Original video animation

Aria the OVA: Arietta
- Directed by: Junichi Sato
- Produced by: Hisao Iizuka; Tetsuo Uchida; Shinsaku Hatta; Yasuhiro Mikami; Toshiaki Asaka
- Written by: Junichi Sato
- Music by: Choro Club; Takeshi Senoo
- Studio: Hal Film Maker
- Licensed by: NA: Nozomi Entertainment; UK: MVM Films
- Released: 21 September 2007
- Runtime: 30 minutes
- Anime television series

Aria the Origination
- Directed by: Junichi Sato; Kenichi Takeshita (Assistant)
- Produced by: Hisao Iizuka; Tetsuo Uchida; Shinya Tagashira; Yoshikazu Beniya; Toshiaki Asaka
- Written by: Junichi Sato
- Music by: Choro Club; Takeshi Senoo
- Studio: Hal Film Maker
- Licensed by: NA: Nozomi Entertainment; UK: MVM Films
- Original network: TXN (TV Tokyo)
- Original run: 8 January 2008 – 31 March 2008
- Episodes: 13 + 1 (DVD bonus)
- Original video animation

Aria the Avvenire
- Directed by: Junichi Sato; Takahiro Natori (Assistant)
- Produced by: Hisao Iizuka
- Written by: Junichi Sato
- Music by: Choro Club; Takeshi Senoo
- Studio: TYO Animations
- Licensed by: NA: Nozomi Entertainment; SA/SEA: Muse Communication
- Released: 26 September 2015 – 24 June 2016
- Episodes: 3
- Anime film

Aria the Crepuscolo
- Directed by: Junichi Sato (Chief); Takahiro Natori
- Written by: Junichi Sato
- Music by: Choro Club; Takeshi Senoo
- Studio: J.C.Staff
- Licensed by: SA/SEA: Muse Communication
- Released: 5 March 2021
- Runtime: 60 minutes
- Anime film

Aria the Benedizione
- Directed by: Junichi Sato (Chief); Takahiro Natori
- Written by: Junichi Sato
- Music by: Choro Club; Takeshi Senoo
- Studio: J.C.Staff
- Licensed by: SA/SEA: Muse Communication
- Released: 3 December 2021
- Runtime: 60 minutes
- icon

Aria (stylized as ARIA) is a Japanese manga series written and illustrated by Kozue Amano. The series was originally titled Aqua (stylized as AQUA) when it was published in Enix's Monthly Stencil magazine in 2001, and retitled when it was transferred to Mag Garden's Comic Blade, where it continued serialization from 2002 to 2008. Aqua was collected in two tankōbon volumes, and Aria was collected in twelve volumes.

Hal Film Maker has adapted the manga into several anime television series. A first season was broadcast in 2005, a second season in 2006, an OVA released September 2007, and a third season in 2008 that ended around the same time as the manga serialization. An OVA, titled Aria the Avvenire, was released in the anime series' 10th anniversary Blu-ray box sets between December 2015 and June 2016. A film to celebrate the 15th anniversary of the anime series titled Aria the Crepuscolo premiered on 5 March 2021. A second anime film titled Aria the Benedizione premiered on 3 December 2021.

ADV Manga released English translations of the first three volumes of Aria in 2004 before dropping the license. Tokyopop then acquired the English-language rights to Aqua as well as Aria. Tokyopop released the two volumes of Aqua in October 2007 and February 2008 and six volumes of Aria between January 2008 and December 2010. The anime is licensed in North America by The Right Stuf International, which released all three seasons in box sets under its Nozomi Entertainment imprint between 30 September 2008 and 2 March 2010.

The series is set in the 24th century on a terraformed Mars, now named Aqua, and follows a young woman named Akari Mizunashi as she trains as an apprentice gondolier (known as Undines). The series has been praised for its calm pacing, optimistic worldview, beautiful art, and for the anime, the quality of the soundtrack.

== Story ==
Aqua and Aria take place in the early 24th century, starting in 2301 AD, in the city of Neo-Venezia (ネオ・ヴェネツィア, Neo Venetsia; literally "New Venice") on the planet Aqua (アクア, Akua; formerly Mars, sometimes stylized as 火星(アクア) in the manga with the base text for "Mars" serving as a gloss), which was renamed after being terraformed into a habitable planet covered in oceans around 150 years beforehand. Neo-Venezia, based on Venice in both architecture and atmosphere, is a harbor city of narrow canals instead of streets, traveled by unmotorized gondolas.

At the start of Aqua, a young woman named Akari arrives from Manhome (マンホーム, Manhōmu; formerly Earth, sometimes stylized as 地球(マンホーム) with the base text for "Earth" serving as a gloss) to become a trainee gondolier with Aria Company, one of the three most prestigious water-guide companies in the city. Her dream is to become an Undine, a gondolier who acts as a tour guide. As she trains, Akari befriends her mentor Alicia, trainees and seniors from rival companies—Aika, Alice, Akira, and Athena—and others in Neo-Venezia. Aqua covers Akari's arrival on Aqua and her early training as a Pair or apprentice. Aria continues her training as a Single, or journeyman, culminating in the graduation of Akari, Aika, and Alice as full Prima Undines.

Each chapter is a slice of life episode of Akari's exploration of the worlds of gondoliers, Neo-Venezia, and Aqua itself. Amano frequently uses several pages of lush art to depict an environment, showing the wonder of both everyday activities as well as one-of-a-kind events. It has been described by reviewers as very similar in tone and effect to Yokohama Kaidashi Kikou.

== Characters ==
=== Aria Company ===
Aria Company is a small water-guide company that starts with only two employees. Its uniforms are lined with blue, and its president (and namesake) is Aria Pokoteng.

Akari Mizunashi (水無 灯里, Mizunashi Akari)
Voiced by: Erino Hazuki (Japanese); Veronica Taylor (English)
A native of Japan on Manhome (Earth) who immigrates to Aqua when she is 15 to become an Undine. While not as skillful at rowing a gondola as Alice nor as familiar with the history of her adopted city as Aika, Akari makes friends quickly and easily converses with customers and other strangers. She is depicted as optimistic and cheerful, finding enjoyment in things or events that others think are humdrum and mundane, for which Aika and Alice call her "mysterious"; in the anime, Aika and Alice separately comment that Akari seems to attract mysterious phenomena to her. Akari often says Hohe or Hahi, which is her short version of "wow". When Akari used gondola simulations on Manhome, she accidentally learned how to row backwards and has to relearn the proper method when she starts at Aria Company; however, as Alicia puts it, "When rowing backward, Akari-chan is unrivaled!"
Most chapters of the manga and episodes of the anime are framed with narration taken from e-mails written by Akari. In the anime, the recipient is a young girl named Ai, a customer in the first episode who becomes Akari's pen pal, but in the manga the recipient is someone she does not name and is referred to as zenryaku but has never seen.
At the start of Aqua, Akari arrives on Aqua as a new Pair (apprentice) at Aria Company. In chapter 5 of Aqua, when Aika is promoted to Single (journeyman), Alicia tests and promotes Akari as well. Later, in chapter 58 of Aria and episode 12 of Aria the Origination, after Aika is promoted to Prima (full Undine), Alicia gives Akari the test for Prima. When Akari passes, she is given the title "Aquamarine" (遙かなる蒼, Harukanaru Ao; lit. "Distant Blue").
Alicia Florence (アリシア・フローレンス, Arishia Furōrensu)
Voiced by: Sayaka Ohara (Japanese); Marissa Lenti (English)
The only other Undine with Aria Company, Alicia is one of the Three Water Fairies of Neo-Venezia, known by the title "Snow White" (白き妖精, Shiroki Yōsei; lit. "White Fairy"). At the start of the series, she is 19 years old and the most popular Undine in the city, noted especially for her graceful rowing style. She was promoted to Prima at 15, the youngest ever to do so. Like Akari, she is relaxed and easy-going, but she also likes to tease others, especially her childhood friend Akira. Her favorite phrase is "My, my" (ara ara; "Well Well") and she frequently giggles, to Akira's annoyance. According to Grandma Akino, she is an excellent Undine because of her ability to enjoy everything.
At the end of the series, Alicia announces her upcoming marriage and retirement to take an administrative position within the Gondola Association. She tells Akari she had put off her Prima exam because she had been planning to retire after that and did not want to leave her student and friend. According to issue No. 6 of Monthly Undine, after her retirement, "Snow White" is designated the 8th "honored appellation" by the Gondola Association, as an Undine who made great contributions to the industry.
Akino Ametsuchi (天地 秋乃, Ametsuchi Akino) , nicknamed "Grandma" (グランマ, Guranma)
Voiced by: Yoshiko Matsuo (Japanese); Karen Smith (English)
A famous and long-serving Prima Undine, who started Aria Company with Aria Pokoteng after realizing she was missing too much of life as Himeya's top ace. She was Prima Undine for 30 years and mentor to Alicia, her last disciple, to whom she left the company on her retirement. She is highly respected by younger Undines, who call her "Grandma".
Ai Aino (愛野アイ, Aino Ai)
Voiced by: Kaori Mizuhashi (Japanese); Lisa Oritz (English)
A girl from Manhome. In the anime, she befriends Akari in episode 1 and becomes Akari's e-mail correspondent, while visiting Aqua whenever she can. In the manga, she first appears in chapter 60 as Aria Company's newest employee. In both versions, at the end of the series she becomes a Pair under Akari after Alicia's marriage and retirement. At some point before the start in the OVA Aria the Avvenire, she becomes a Single.
Anna (アンナ, Anna)
Voiced by: Risa Hayamizu (Japanese); Erica Schroeder (English)
A retired Undine who trained under Grandma Akino, becoming a Prima before Alicia. She left Aria Company shortly after Alicia was promoted to Prima to marry a fisherman named Alberto. She has a son named Ahito, and lives with her family on Neo-Burano Island.

=== Himeya Company ===
Main cast as they appear in the third season of the anime: from left to right, Aika, Akari, and Alice

Himeya Company is the oldest and currently second-ranking water-guide company in Neo-Venezia. It employs 80 Undines, with a uniform lined with red. Its president is Hime Granzchesta.

Aika S. Granzchesta (藍華・S・グランチェスタ, Aika Esu Guranchesuta)
Voiced by: Chiwa Saitō (Japanese); Jessica Calvello (English)
The first friend Akari makes on Aqua, Aika is 16 when they meet. Aika is a Pair and then Single at Himeya Company. She is the only daughter and heir of Himeya Company's owners. However, she does not enjoy the distinction as she feels the company's employees fawn on her too much. Aika speaks bluntly and often responds to Akari's idealistic comments with "Embarrassing remarks are not allowed!" (恥ずかしいセリフ禁止!, Hazukashii serifu kinshi!). Despite their contrasting personalities, she gets along well with Akari and Alice. However, she frequently squabbles with her mentor, Akira, whom she resembles. Aika considers herself reliable, especially compared to the distractible Akari and antisocial Alice, but both her friends call her a crybaby for her tendency to tear up when emotional. She is proud of her gondola skill as an Undine and can be very competitive about it. She also greatly admires Alicia and finds any excuse to visit Aria Company—and once tells Akari that if not for her family obligations, she would have joined Aria Company. Over the course of the series, Aika develops feelings for Al.
In chapter 58, Aika becomes a Prima, taking the title "Rosen Queen" (薔薇の女王, Bara no Joō; lit. "Queen of Roses"). She takes charge of a newly opened Himeya branch office in preparation for taking on the whole company one day.
Akira E. Ferrari (晃・E・フェラーリ, Akira Ī Ferāri)
Voiced by: Junko Minagawa (Japanese); Carol Jacobanis (English)
One of Neo-Venezia's Three Water Fairies and a native of Aqua. As a Prima Undine, Akira is called the "Crimson Rose" (真紅の薔薇, Shinku no Bara) and is famed for her conversational skills. She has many admirers among her customers, especially her female ones, but she considers herself very feminine. In flashbacks, Akira is shown as very tomboyish when young, to the point of using a male pronoun for "I" (俺, ore) (see gender differences in spoken Japanese) and being mistaken for a boy by Akatsuki. Akira is a mentor to Aika, who calls her the Demon Instructor for her strictness and loud, brusque personality. Akira is particularly harsh with Aika because she believes there is potential in her, and Aika admits that it is only due to Akira's strictness and honesty that she has become a good Undine.
Akira and Alicia are childhood friends, and their relationship mirrors Aika and Akari's. However, Alicia teases Akira far more than Akari does Aika. Akira still resents that Alicia became a Prima before her. Upon Alicia's retirement at the end of the series, Akira becomes the undisputed top Undine in Neo-Venezia.
Ayumi K. Jasmine (アユミ・K・ジャスミン, Ayumi Kei Jasumin)
Voiced by: Ryoko Shiraishi (Japanese); Eileen Montgomery (English)
Ayumi appears in the Origination series as a cheerful Single for Himeya Company, who often works as a traghetto rower with Atora and Anzu from Orange Planet. Unlike many Undines, Ayumi doesn't plan to become a Prima because she wants to specialize in the traghetto, which gets her involved with the city and its people as well as lets her make money.
Azusa B. McLaren (あずさ・B・マクラーレン, Azusa Bī Makurāren)
Voiced by: Mai Nakahara (Japanese); Cassidy Ladden (English)
A newly trained Single under Aika in the Avvenire series.

=== Orange Planet ===
Supporting cast as they appear in the anime: from left to right, in front President Aria, Mr. Postman, President Hime, Ai, Alicia, and Al; in back "Grandma" Akino, Akira, Athena (with President Maa on her head), Akatsuki, and Woody

Orange Planet is the largest water-guide company in Neo-Venezia, employing 81 Undines (including 20 Primas). Its uniforms are lined with yellow, and its president is Maa.

Alice Carroll (アリス・キャロル, Arisu Kyaroru)
Voiced by: Ryō Hirohashi (Japanese); Tara Tisch (English)
Alice is a 14-year-old Undine for Orange Planet. She first appears (in volume 3 of Aria/episode 3 of Aria the Animation) as a standoffish, detached girl. Aika later describes her as anti-social and complains about her tendency to put on a grim face and speak in a quiet voice. Alice speaks in a deadpan manner, though she frequently uses dekkai (でっかい; literally, "huge") as an intensifier. Although initially only a Pair, her rowing already surpasses both Aika and Akari's—for which skill Orange Planet scouted her despite her young age. Despite working for rival companies, Alice, Akari, and Aika often practice together, and Alice sincerely enjoys the others' company, though this does not stop her from telling them to be quiet when they argue. Because of her age and lower status, Aika often addresses her as "kōhai-chan" (後輩ちゃん; "junior" said in a friendly manner). Through her friendship with Akari and Aika, Alice lightens up as the series progresses. However, she still struggles with her detachment.
For a long time, Alice was not confident in her singing skills until Athena advised her to enjoy what she sings and not worry about her performance. In volume 11 of Aria, after Alice graduates from middle school, she is promoted to Prima straight from Pair, the first Undine to do so, and is given the title "Orange Princess" (黄昏の姫君, Tasogare no Himegimi; lit. "Twilight Princess").
Athena Glory (アテナ・グローリィ, Atena Gurōryi)
Voiced by: Tomoko Kawakami, Rina Satō (2021 film) (Japanese); Michele Knotz (English)
One of Neo-Venezia's Three Water Fairies, known by the title "Siren" (天上の謳声, Tenjō no Utagoe; lit. "Heavenly Voice") for her beautiful singing voice. She is Alice's mentor at Orange Planet. She is quiet most of the time and often appears to be an airhead who does not pay attention to her surroundings (in the anime, she is shown more than once forgetting to duck while rowing under a bridge), but she genuinely cares about Alice. Athena has a strange laugh that comes out sounding as though she is angry. She was a trainee Undine with Alicia and Akira. She joined them in joint practice sessions like Akari, Aika, and Alice do now. At the conclusion of the series, Athena semi-retires from being an Undine to debut as an opera singer.
Atora Monteverdi (アトーラ・モンテヴェルディ, Atōra Monteverudi)
Voiced by: Houko Kuwashima (Japanese); Debora Rabbai (English)
Atora is a Single for Orange Planet who appears in the Origination series. She often works as a traghetto rower with Anzu as well as Ayumi from Himeya Company. Atora took the Prima exam once but did not pass and became too discouraged to try again. After meeting Akari during her stint in the traghetto, she decides to train harder to retake the exam.
Anzu Yumeno (夢野 杏, Yumeno Anzu)
Voiced by: Kana Asumi (Japanese); Michaela Bryce (English)
Anzu is a Single for Orange Planet who appears in Origination. She often works as a traghetto rower with Atora as well as Ayumi from Himeya Company. Although Anzu has failed her Prima exam several times, she continues to work hard and is determined to become a Prima.
Anya Dostoyevskaya (アーニャ・ドストエフスカヤ, Anya Dosutoefusukaya)
Voiced by: Ai Kayano (Japanese); Erica Schroeder (English)
A newly trained Single under Alice in the Avvenire series and the Crepuscolo movie.

=== Cats ===
Because blue-eyed cats are considered lucky on Aqua, all Undine companies have a blue-eyed cat as a mascot, who is given the title President. Cats on Aqua have been bred to be as intelligent as humans, though they cannot speak.

President Aria Pokoteng (アリア・ポコテン, Aria Pokoten)
Voiced by: Chinami Nishimura (Japanese); Tara Tisch (English)
President and namesake of Aria Company, and an Aqua cat. Aria is large and fat, massing 10 kg. He is attracted to President Hime, who does not appear to reciprocate his sentiments; his pursuit of her is a common comic relief scene.
President Hime M. Granzchesta (ヒメ・M・グランチェスタ, Hime Emu Guranchesuta)
Voiced by: Kaori Mizuhashi (Japanese)
President of Himeya Company, a small, delicate, black female cat from Manhome. "Hime" means princess in Japanese.
President Maa (まぁ)
Voiced by: Akeno Watanabe (Japanese); Greg Schettino (English)
President of Orange Planet, an Aqua kitten with very tiny blue eyes. Alice calls her "Maa-kun" after her unusual meow. Maa often bites President Aria's belly. The volume 8, Special Navigation, an annual President checkup reveals that Maa is actually a female cat and much attracted to President Aria.
Cait Sith (ケット・シー, Ketto Shī)
A huge cat with mysterious powers, said to be Cat-sìth from Scottish folklore. He has been the king of the cat kingdom in Aqua for at least 100 years. In the anime, Alicia and Akari suggest that he is the spiritual guardian of Aqua. Jun'ichi Satō, the anime director, claimed that his interpretation is "a little different from the original manga's interpretation". It is hinted at various times throughout the manga as he secretly guides and protects Akari to the seven mysteries of Neo Venezia, and is ultimately revealed that he is Akari's pen pal and the final mystery.

=== Other characters ===
Akatsuki Izumo (出雲 暁, Izumo Akatsuki)
Voiced by: Hirofumi Nojima (Japanese); Wayne Grayson (English)
Akari's first customer as a Single. He is a tall, impatient young man who calls Akari "Pigtails" or "Sideburns" (momiko) to tease her. He works as an apprentice Salamander, someone who helps maintain Aqua's climate in the floating buildings that are tethered overhead. Although drawn like a typical bishōnen, his constant scowl combined with a loose-fitting robe usually covers up his more "attractive" features, which he rarely displays. Akatsuki has an older brother who teases him to the point of rage.
Akatsuki is not on the ground often, so every visit to the surface is an adventure for him. He claims to be in love with Alicia, though Alicia and his older brother suggest that he is really attracted to Akari. In any case, every visit to Neo-Venezia, no matter his official reason, he spends most of his time with Akari.
Udo Ayanokoji the 51st (綾小路宇土51世)
Voiced by: Yūji Ueda (Japanese); James Carter Cathcart (English)
More commonly known as "Woody". Woody is a Sylph who delivers packages and other goods to people in Neo-Venezia. He has a bad sense of direction and cannot navigate without a map. His physique is well-built, and he is usually seen wearing goggles. He was childhood friends with both Akatsuki and Al.
Albert "Al" Pitt (アルバート・ピット, Arubāto Pitto)
Voiced by: Akeno Watanabe (Japanese); Graham Halstead (English)
Al is a Gnome, a person who lives underground regulating Aqua's gravity so that it is the same as Manhome's. Gnomes rarely come to the surface except to shop. He looks younger than Akari and Aika, but he is actually three years older. His young appearance is due to the stronger gravity underground making him smaller.
Namihei Anno (庵野波平, Anno Namihei) / Mr. Postman (郵便屋さん, Yūbin'ya-san)
Voiced by: Motomu Kiyokawa (Japanese); Mike Pollock (English)
An elderly mailman in Neo-Venezia, called Mailman-san or Mr. Postman by Akari. He is the first person that Akari meets after arriving on Aqua. He is a kind man who is devoted to his work and his younger co-workers. Akari does not learn his name until near the end of the series when he hires her for a gondola ride after retiring from his job.

== Terms ==
Several terms of the world of Aqua are derived from elemental mythology:

Undine (水先案内人(ウンディーネ), Undīne)
A gondolier acting as a refined tour guide for visitors to Neo-Venezia. All known Undines are young girls and women, except those of the gender-flip parallel world in the Special Navigation of volume 6.
Pair (ペア, Pea)
An apprentice Undine who has just begun practicing sculling a gondola. A Pair is recognized by her pair of gloves, worn to protect her hands as she builds up calluses. When a Pair is promoted to Single, she removes one glove. This is translated by Nozomi and ADV as "Pair", and by Tokyopop as "apprentice".
Single (シングル, Shinguru)
A journeyman Undine qualified to take customers only under supervision. So-called because she wears only one glove. Nozomi and ADV translate this as "Single," and by Tokyopop as "journeyman."
Prima (プリマ, Purima)
A graduated Undine who is no longer a Single. Once an Undine becomes a Prima, they can take customers without supervision. This is translated by Nozomi and ADV as "Prima", and by Tokyopop as "full-fledged Undine".
Salamander (火炎之番人(サラマンダー), Saramandā)
A person working at controlling the weather and adding heat to the atmosphere as part of terraforming Aqua. Salamanders live in floating islands tethered at high altitude.
Gnome (地重管理人(ノーム), Nōmu)
A person working underground to regulate the gravity of Aqua, so that it is as strong as Manhome (Earth). Because of their environment, most gnomes are short and have bad eyesight.
Sylph (風追配達人(シルフ), Shirufu)
A person who makes deliveries by air bike. Deliveries are done by air in Neo-Venezia because only unpowered watercraft such as gondolas are allowed in the smaller canals of the city.
Traghetto
A gondola designed to ferry several people across the Grand Canal. Because of its size and the number of passengers, the gondola is rowed by two Singles.
Three Water Fairies (水の三大妖精, Mizu no Sandaiyōsei)
Neo-Venezia's three most accomplished Undines at the time of the series: Alicia Florence, Akira E. Ferrari, and Athena Glory.
Seven Mysteries of Neo Venezia (ネオ・ヴェネツィアの七不思議, Neo Venetsia no Nanafushigi)
The seven mysteries of the city of Neo Venezia that very few people have ever gotten to witness. Akari is the only person to do so when the story takes place, thanks to personal guidance from Cait Sith. Those mysteries include the endless waterway hall, the Carnival Casanova, the mirage coffee shop, the galactic train that runs in the night sky, the legendary lady of San Michele Island, the (street) stone of misfortune, and Cait Sith himself.

== Development ==
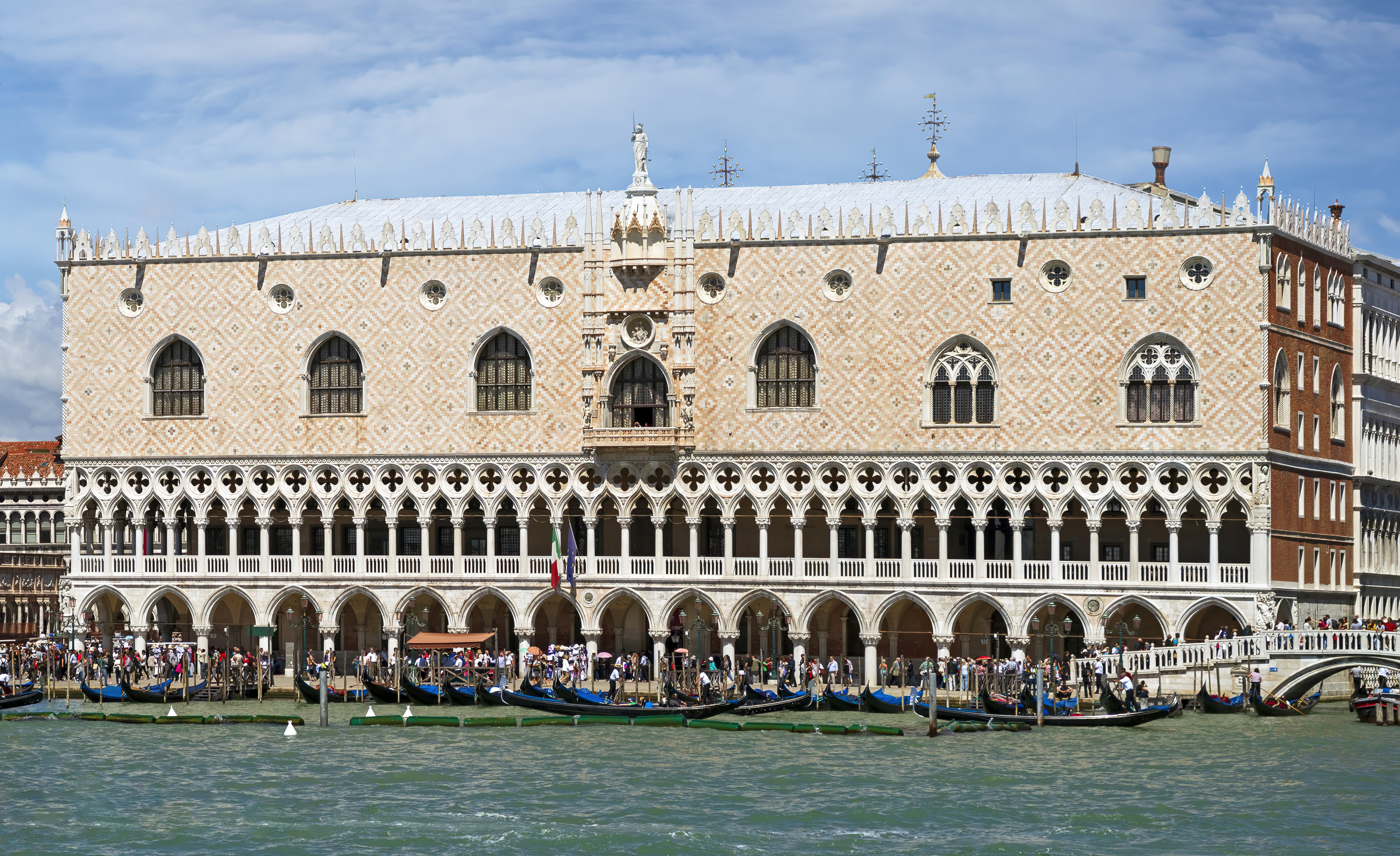
Doge's Palace in Venice as seen from the sea

The equivalent location in Neo-Venezia (from Aria volume 5, Navigation 24)

According to her original afterword to Aqua volume 2, Kozue Amano's goal in writing the series was to have readers find happiness in small things and to not focus on their failures. In another afterword, she stated that writing Aria has forced her to pay attention to the four seasons and that she hopes the series shows her appreciation for them. Amano developed a 24-month calendar system for Aqua, based on Mars's real orbital period of 668.6 local days (see Timekeeping on Mars), making every season 6 months long. Amano marked the passage of time and the seasons throughout the series through such means as Akari explicitly telling her correspondent the time of year and depicting seasonal observances such as fireworks at the end of summer (Aqua volume 2, Navigation 9 and Aria volume 4, Navigation 20), New Year's Eve (Aria volume 2, Navigation 9), or birthdays of characters (Aria volume 10, Navigation 46).

In the universe of Aqua and Aria, Neo-Venezia's builders modeled it after the city of Venice before its demise in the 21st century, including counterparts to such public landmarks as the Piazza San Marco and the Bridge of Sighs. In creating Neo-Venezia, Amano also based some of the fictional locations of the series on real Venetian locations. Examples include:

- The Aria Company headquarters corresponds to the location of a vaporetto stop.
- The Himeya Company headquarters is in the Danieli Hotel, located on the southern promenade, near Piazza San Marco.

Other locations on Aqua that Amano based on real places include the Japanese shrine visited in Aria volume 1, based on Fushimi Inari-taisha near Kyoto.

=== Adaptation as an anime ===
As part of the preparations for the first season of the anime adaptation, the production crew led by director Jun'ichi Satō made a trip to Venice for location research. As a result of filming the movements of gondoliers sculling, they had to redraw the animation of Undines rowing in the first episodes to make it realistic. Satō said that seeing a gondolier use his paddle to toss a bottle out of the water inspired the scene in episode 11 of Aria the Animation where Alicia does the same with a ball, which was not in the manga. As part of the production company's commitment to adapting the manga faithfully and gesture of consideration toward the voice actors, they provided the collected volumes of Aqua and Aria to date, rather than requiring them to purchase their own or giving stacks of photocopies.

According to Jun'ichi Satō, it was a struggle to fit the available material into the 13 episodes of the first season, which focused closely on Akari. The title of the second season, Aria the Natural, came about because he had 26 episodes to work with, letting him treat the story in a more "natural" manner, allowing the series to develop other characters more.

Choro Club and Takeshi Senoo composed 30 works of music for the first season of the anime and 15 for the second. Jun'ichi Satō and sound designer Yasuno Satō assigned Choro Club and Takeshi Senoo abstract themes instead of plot points, which was an unfamiliar method for the composers who did not have much experience working for anime shows. Takeshi Senoo and the three members of Choro Club make a cameo appearance as musicians in episode 23 of Aria the Natural. Jun'ichi Satō has commented that the lyrics for the songs "Barracole" and "Coccolo", sung by Eri Kawai as the voice of Athena Glory, were gibberish. The lyrics for the first two seasons' theme songs were also initially meant to be gibberish, but after reading the manga Eri Kawai decided to write Japanese lyrics: "I read the original manga and wrote the lyrics, using my image of Neo-Venezia as a starting point. Then did my best to match words that flowed with the melody." Kawai made demo recordings for Yui Makino as a guide for her performance of the theme songs. Takeshi Senoo has described "Smile Again", the second ending theme song of Aria the Natural, as a song about the end of summer, and envisioned it being sung by Erino Hazuki as Akari.

== Media ==
=== Manga ===
The manga was written and illustrated by Kozue Amano and has a complicated publishing history. Aqua was originally published by Enix in Monthly Stencil magazine from January to September 2001 and collected in two tankōbon volumes. When the series moved to Mag Garden's Comic Blade magazine in February 2002, the title changed to Aria. Mag Garden later re-released the two volumes of Aqua with additional material and new covers. Serialization completed in February 2008. In all, the 70 serialized chapters of Aqua and Aria were collected in 14 tankōbon volumes, each volume containing five chapters covering a season of the year. Each volume is called a "voyage," and each chapter a "navigation."

In English, Aria (but not Aqua) was originally licensed by ADV Manga, who dropped the license after publishing three volumes. The North American license for Aqua and Aria was picked up by Tokyopop, which began releasing the series starting with the first volume of Aqua. The series has been licensed in France by Kami, in Germany by Tokyopop Germany, in Italy by Star Comics, in Indonesia by M&C Comics, in South Korea by Bookbox, in Spain by Editorial Ivrea, in Taiwan by Tong Li Comics, and in Thailand by Bongkoch Comics.

=== Anime ===
Aqua and Aria were adapted by Hal Film Maker as a 54-episode anime television series comprising two seasons titled Aria the Animation and Aria the Natural, an original video animation (OVA) titled Aria the OVA: Arietta, and a third season titled Aria the Origination. The series was directed by Junichi Sato with character designs by Makoto Koga, and broadcast on the TV Tokyo Network between 2005 and 2008. All three seasons have been released on DVD in Japan. A special OVA series, Aria the Avvenire, received an event screening on 26 September 2015. It was animated by TYO Animations.

The series is licensed in North America by The Right Stuf International. A DVD box set of the English subtitled first season was released on 30 September 2008 under its Nozomi Entertainment imprint. The second season was released in two box sets on 29 January and 24 March 2009. The third season box set, including the Arietta OVA and the bonus episode numbered 5.5, was released on 2 March 2010. On 12 August 2017, Right Stuf launched a Kickstarter campaign to produce an English dub and a Blu-ray release for the first season of the series, which ended on 11 September 2017 with a total of $595,676 raised, which is $230,000 over the final stretch goal of dubbing the entire franchise, including the 10th Anniversary special OVA series, Avvenire. The series is licensed in Australia by Siren Visual. The series has been licensed in the United Kingdom by MVM Entertainment, and was released on Blu-ray on 25 October 2021.

The series is licensed in Korea by Animax Asia, in Taiwan by Muse Communications, in France by Kaze, and in Italy by Yamato Video. The series was also broadcast in Italy on the Rai 4.

==== Films ====
It was announced on 14 April 2020 that the franchise would debut a new work scheduled for winter 2020 in celebration of the series' 15th anniversary. On 22 July 2020, it was announced that the new work would be an anime film titled Aria the Crepuscolo, which premiered on 5 March 2021. The film was produced by J.C.Staff and directed by Takahiro Natori, with the main staff members reprising their roles.

After the film Aria the Crepuscolo's release, a new anime project titled Aria the Benedizione was announced, which would serve as the third and final installment of the "Blue Curtain Call" trilogy. On 21 March 2021, it was announced that the anime project is a film that will premiere in winter 2021. The cast and staff from the previous film reprised their roles. On 10 August 2021, two new cast members were revealed and the release date of 3 December 2021 was announced.

=== Soundtracks ===
Several soundtrack albums were released for Aria, including an album for each of the three seasons of the anime, two piano music collections, a song collection, and a tribute album. Singles were released for the opening and closing themes for all three anime seasons, the OVA, and the two visual novel adaptations. Most of the releases charted on the Oricon charts, with the highest ranking album being Aria the Natural Vocal Song Collection at 30th, and the highest ranking single being "Euforia", the opening theme for Aria the Natural, at 18th.

=== Drama CDs ===
Four series of drama CDs have been released. The first series was produced before the anime began and uses different voice actors; the other three were produced in conjunction with the three seasons of the anime, using the anime voice actors.

- The first series comprises two volumes dramatizing episodes from the early volumes of Aria, released 25 August 2004 and 24 August 2005, and one volume dramatizing episodes from Aqua, released 22 September 2005.
- The second series was produced in conjunction with Aria the Animation. It comprises three volumes titled Blue, Red, and Orange, after the uniform colors of Aria Company, Himeya Company, and Orange Planet, which were released 25 November 2005, 22 December 2005, and 25 January 2006, respectively. Red and Orange peak ranked 237th and 161st on the Oricon albums chart respectively. A drama CD box containing the second series was released for 27 July 2009, including a new drama CD as bonus material, and peak ranked 62nd on Oricon albums chart.
- The third series was produced in conjunction with Aria the Natural. It comprises two volumes released 23 June 2006 and 21 July 2006. The first and second volumes peak ranked 132nd and 166th on the Oricon albums chart, respectively. A drama CD box containing the third series was released for 27 January 2010, including a new drama CD as bonus material, and peak ranked 82nd on Oricon albums chart.
- The fourth series was produced in conjunction with Aria the Origination. It comprises three volumes titled Yuki ("snow"), Tsuki ("moon"), and Hana ("flower"), released 21 March 2008, 23 April 2008, and 21 May 2008, respectively. Yuki, Tsuki and Hana peak ranked 87th, 55th, and 48th on the Oricon albums chart, respectively.

Additional drama CDs were included as bonus materials for each volume of Aria Perfect Guide.

=== Radio CDs ===
An Aria radio show called Aria the Station was broadcast on the internet through onsen.ag and Animate throughout November 2006 in conjunction with the three seasons of the anime. The 115 episodes were later compiled on "radio CDs" released in three seasons. Each volume contains a CD-ROM with the radio episodes in MP3 format plus an audio CD containing additional material. The radio show starred Erino Hazuki as Akari Mizunashi and Chinami Nishimura as President Aria Pokoteng, with other voice actors from the anime as guests reprising their respective roles.

- The 12 episodes of the first season were collected on one album called Aria the Station Neo-Venezia Informale, released on 29 September 2006.
- The 51 episodes of the second season, Aria the Station Due were collected on four volumes. The first volume, numbered Cour.1, was released on 24 November 2006; the second, Cour.2, on 29 December 2006; Cour.3 on 23 February 2007; and Cour.4 on 25 May 2007.
- The 52 episodes of the third season, Aria the Station Tricolore, were collected the four volumes. The first volume, numbered Cour.1, was released on 28 September 2007; the second, Cour.2, on 21 December 2007; Cour.3 on 28 March 2008; and Cour.4 on 27 June 2008.

=== Video games ===
The Alchemist company produced two visual novel video games for the PS2 based on Aria. Both were released in regular and special editions on the same day.

- Aria the Natural: Tooi Yume no Mirage ("Mirage of a Distant Dream") was released 28 September 2006. This was later re-released on 6 March 2008 as part of the Alchemist Best Collection.
- Aria the Origination: Aoi Hoshi no Il Cielo ("The Sky Over the Blue Planet") was released 26 June 2008. It ranked 30th for its first release week on the Famitsu sales chart with 7221 copies sold.

=== Other books ===
==== Art books ====
Four art books were published by Mag Garden containing drawings and sketches for Aqua and Aria by Kozue Amano:

- Alpha (ISBN 978-4-86127-009-3) was released 29 January 2004.
- Stella (ISBN 978-4-86127-140-3) was released 29 March 2005.
- Cielo (ISBN 978-4-86127-297-4) was released 30 August 2006.
- Birth (ISBN 978-4-86127-804-4) was released 10 February 2011.

Mag Garden published a fifth art book containing additional artwork used in the anime, video games, drama CDs, and merchandising:

- Aria the Illustration Avvenire (ISBN 978-4-86127-573-9) was released 24 December 2008.

In addition, three poster books have been published, each containing ten A2-format posters:

- Aria Premium Poster Book (ISBN 978-4-86127-213-4) was released 22 December 2005.
- Aria Premium Poster Book 2 (ISBN 978-4-86127-328-5) was released 22 December 2006.
- Aria Premium Poster Book 3 (ISBN 978-4-86127-447-3) was released 22 December 2007.

==== Guide books ====
Four guide books to Aria have been released by Mag Garden:

- The first guide book, Aria Navigation Guide (ISBN 978-4-86127-212-7), released 29 October 2005, is focused on the manga. It includes background materials, character profiles, and a summary of the series by chapter from the start of Aqua through volume 7 of Aria.
- Three guide books cover the three seasons of the anime, containing episode summaries, descriptions of primary and secondary characters, and other anime-related materials. Each book also contains a bonus manga chapter and a drama CD. Aria the Animation Perfect Guide Book (ISBN 978-4-86127-263-9) was released 29 March 2006, Aria the Natural Perfect Guide Book (ISBN 978-4-86127-327-8) was released 22 December 2006, and Aria the Origination Perfect Guide Book (ISBN 978-4-86127-510-4) was released 30 July 2008.

Additionally, Shinkigesha published guide books for each of Alchemist's two Aria video games, containing background materials, character profiles, and plot summaries covering all outcomes of the game:

- Aria the Natural: Tooi Yume no Mirage Game Material Collection (ISBN 978-4-7753-0523-2) was released on 22 December 2006.
- Aria the Origination: Aoi Hoshi no Il Cielo Game Material Collection (ISBN 978-4-7753-0645-1) was released on 1 September 2008.

==== Novels ====
Aria has also been adapted as series of light novels published by Mag Garden, with two released as of January 2025:

- Mizu no Miyako to Kanashiki Utahime no Monogatari (水の都と哀しき歌姫の物語) by Ayuna Fujisaki (ISBN 978-4-86127-241-7) – published 28 February 2006
- The Gift of the Four Season's Breeze (四季の風の贈り物, Shiki no Kaze no Okurimono) by Mari Okada, Ayuna Fujisaki, Tatsuhiko Urahata, and Reiko Yoshida (ISBN 978-4-86127-448-0) – published 10 January 2008

==== Monthly Undine ====
Monthly Undine is a spin-off facsimile of the Undine-focused magazine mentioned in the Aria universe. Six issues of Monthly Undine have been released as of January 2025 with a different character on each cover, each containing a collectible item. The first three magazines contain toy house parts with Himeya Company's Akira and Aika, toy house parts with Aria Company's Alicia and Akari, and toy house parts with Orange Planet's Athena and Alice respectively. When the three magazines' collectible items (toy house parts) are combined, they form a miniature "ARIA Company" building.

| Issue | Cover character | ISBN | Release date |
|---|---|---|---|
| No. 1 | Akira E. Ferrari | ISBN 978-4-86127-268-4 | 10 July 2006 |
| No. 2 | Alicia Florence | ISBN 978-4-86127-269-1 | 18 July 2006 |
| No. 3 | Athena Glory | ISBN 978-4-86127-270-7 | 24 July 2006 |
| No. 4 | Alice Carroll | ISBN 978-4-86127-449-7 | 10 March 2008 |
| No. 5 | Aika S. Granzchesta | ISBN 978-4-86127-450-3 | 21 March 2008 |
| No. 6 | Akari Mizunashi | ISBN 978-4-86127-451-0 | 31 March 2008 |

==== The President Cat Picture books ====
In March 2007, Mag Garden published a series of three Aria picture books. Each hardcover book contains a full-color short manga story focused on a cat president, and includes an additional collectible item written and illustrated by Amano Kozue.

- President Maa Picture Book (ISBN 978-4-86127-337-7) was published 10 March 2007.
- President Hime Picture Book (ISBN 978-4-86127-338-4) was published 20 March 2007.
- President Aria Picture Book (ISBN 978-4-86127-339-1) was released 30 March 2007.

==== Sheet Music ====
Shinko Music published a selection of sheet music called Aria the Best Selection (ISBN 978-4-401-02030-0) in July 2008. It contained the themes from the three anime seasons of Aria.

== Reception ==
Akari and Aika lost inside the Never-ending Waterways (from Aqua volume 1)

In Japan, new volumes of Aria routinely reached the best-seller list for manga, and had sold over 3 million copies as of July 2007, representing 11% of all manga volumes ever sold by its publisher to date. In 2009, this number increased to 4 million.

The English translation of the Aria manga was described by a reviewer at The Comics Journal as "quite conceivably the best comics series ever created for elementary-school girls," calling it "a masterpiece of storytelling and illustration, gorgeous to look at and a feast for the young imagination in its ability to present an inviting, fully realized world." Aqua and Aria together have been praised for their joyful calm, vividly depicted futuristic world, moments of magic, and sense of whimsy. Amano's artwork is praised for her crisp lines and details, especially in the backgrounds and landscapes. Amano has also been criticized for confusingly giving every character a name that begins with A, for letting some slice-of-life stories "drift too far out," and for making Akari's character too sweet and effusive.

In 2006, the anime of Aria was ranked in the top 100 animated television series of all time in a poll by TV Asahi. As of June 2007, the first two seasons of the anime adaptation had sold more than 300,000 DVDs.

The anime has been praised for its quiet atmosphere, beautiful visuals—especially the backgrounds and character designs—and exceptional soundtrack. Anime News Network described the first season as "a gorgeous future fantasy populated with loveable characters", where "each episode is a finely fashioned tone poem steeped in a love of the slow rhythms of everyday life and told with an elegant self-possession that places it light-years beyond the vulgar moralizing of most "uplifting" stories." IGN contrasted Aria with Maria-sama ga Miteru as another series where not much happens, noting that "Maria-sama ratchets up the tension level whenever possible, though, and never mind that all the drama revolves around something completely inconsequential. Aria, on the other hand, is calm and relaxed. It freely admits that the plot is not the point." Several reviewers cited the characters as key to the appeal of the series, though some criticized the characters as unrealistic; the voice acting of Erino Hazuki (Akari) and Junko Minagawa (Akira) were particularly praised. Several reviewers point out that the series does not fit all tastes, being a slow-paced drama with an optimistic outlook.
