= List of aquaria by country =

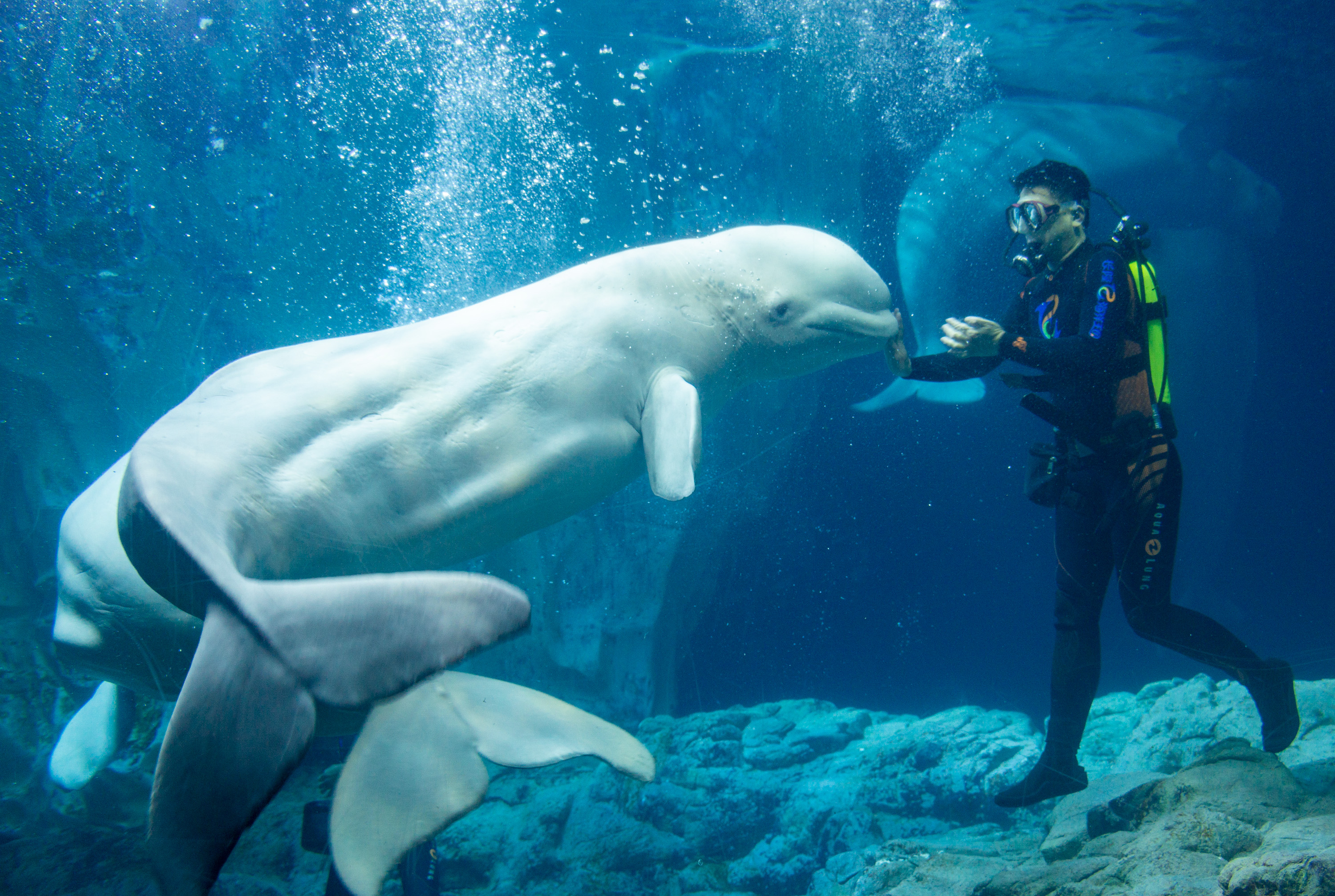
The most visited aquarium in the world with 12 million visitors a year is Chimelong Ocean Kingdom and the aquarium also holds the record for the largest aquarium tank by volume in the world.

This is a list of aquaria (public aquariums). For dolphinariums, see List of dolphinariums. For zoos, see List of zoos. For a list of defunct zoos and aquaria, see List of former zoos and aquariums.

Aquaria are facilities where animals are confined within tanks and displayed to the public, and in which they may also be bred. Such facilities include public aquaria, oceanaria, marine mammal parks, and dolphinaria.

According to Vancouver Aquarium there are over 200 aquaria worldwide.

== Africa ==
=== Egypt ===
- Hurghada Grand Aquarium

=== Morocco ===
- Morocco Mall Aquarium - Casablanca

=== Réunion ===
- Kélonia - Saint-Leu, Réunion

=== South Africa ===
- Two Oceans Aquarium - Cape Town
- UShaka Marine World - Durban

=== Tunisia ===
Friguia Park

== Asia ==
=== China ===
- Beijing Underwater World - Beijing (1998)
- Changfeng Ocean World (Sea Life Shanghai) - Shanghai (1999)
- Chimelong Ocean Kingdom - Hengqin, Zhuhai (2014)
- Cube Aquarium - Chengdu (2015)
- Hangzhou Polar Ocean Park - Hangzhou (2008)
- Hefei Oceanarium - Hefei (future)
- Nanjing Underwater World - Nanjing (1996)
- Polar Ocean World - Qingdao (2006)
- Polar World - Dalian (2002)
- Qingdao Underwater World and Qingdao Aquarium (1932) - Shandong
- Sea Life Sichuan - Sichuan
- Shanghai Ocean Aquarium - Shanghai (2002)
- Sun Asia Ocean World - Dalian (1994)
- Ocean Park - Nam Long Shan, Hong Kong (1977)

=== India ===
- List of aquaria in India

=== Indonesia ===
- Sea World Ancol - Jakarta
- Jakarta Aquarium - Jakarta
- Pangandaran Integrated Aquarium and Marine Research Institute - Pangandaran
- BXsea OceanLife - Tangerang

=== Japan ===
- List of aquaria in Japan

=== Malaysia ===
- Aquaria KLCC - Kuala Lumpur
- Sea Life Malaysia - Legoland Malaysia Resort
- The Green Connection - Kota Kinabalu, Sabah
- Underwater World Langkawi - Cenang Beach, Langkawi Island

=== Pakistan ===
- Clifton Fish Aquarium, Karachi

=== Philippines ===
- Cebu Ocean Park - South Road Properties, Cebu City
- Mactan Island Aquarium - Maribago, Lapu-Lapu City
- Malabon Zoo and Aquarium - Governor Pascual Street, Potrero, Malabon
- Manila Ocean Park - Ermita, Manila
- Ocean Adventure - Subic, Zambales

=== Singapore ===
- Singapore Oceanarium at Marine Life Park - Sentosa
- River Safari

=== South Korea ===
- Aqua Planet
  - Aqua Planet 63 - Seoul
  - Aqua Planet Ilsan - Goyang
  - Aqua Planet Jeju - Jejudo
  - Aqua Planet Yeosu - Yeosu
- Busan Aquarium - Busan
- Sea Life Busan Aquarium - Busan
- Alamalu Aquarium - Sacheon
- COEX Aquarium - Seoul
- Lotte World Aquarium - Seoul
- Daegu Aquarium - Daegu
- Daejeon Aquaworld - Daejeon

=== Sri Lanka ===
- Water World - Kelaniya

=== Taiwan ===
- National Museum of Marine Biology and Aquarium - Checheng
- Penghu Aquarium - Baisha
- Yehliu Ocean World - Wanli
- Farglory Ocean Park - Hualien County
- Taoyuan Aquarium Xpark - Taoyuan, Taiwan
- Taichung Aquarium - Taichung, Taiwan

=== Thailand ===
- Aquaria Phuket - Mueang Phuket District, Phuket
- Bangkok Aquarium - Department of Fisheries, Chatuchak district, Bangkok
- Sea Life Bangkok Ocean World - Siam Paragon, Pathum Wan (Siam), Bangkok
- Bueng Boraphet Aquarium - Bueng Boraphet, Mueang Nakhon Sawan, Nakhon Sawan
- Bueng Chawak Aquarium - Doem Bang Nang Buat, Suphanburi
- Chaloem Phra Kiat Aquarium (Phichit) - Bueng Si Fai, Mueang Phichit, Phichit
- Chaloem Phra Kiat Aquarium (Chanthaburi) - Tha Mai, Chanthaburi
- Chiang Mai Zoo Aquarium - Chiang Mai Zoo, Chiang Mai
- Institute of Marine Science of Burapha University - Burapha University, Bang Saen, Chonburi
- Nong Khai Aquarium - Mueang Nong Khai, Nong Khai
- Pa Sak Jolasid Dam Aquarium - Pa Sak Jolasid Dam, Phatthana Nikhom, Lop Buri
- Phuket Aquarium - Phuket Zoo, Phuket
- Rajamangala Trang Aquarium - Rajamangala University of Technology Srivijaya, Trang Campus, Pak Meng, Trang
- Rayong Aquarium - Mueang Rayong, Rayong
- Samut Sakhon Aquarium - Mueang Samut Sakhon, Samut Sakhon
- Sisaket Aquarium - Mueang Si Sa Ket, Si Sa Ket
- Underwater World Pattaya - Pattaya, Chonburi
- Wang Pla Freshwater Aquarium of Bangsai Arts and Crafts Centre - Bang Sai Arts and Crafts Centre, Bang Sai, Phra Nakhon Si Ayutthaya

=== Vietnam ===
- Times City Vinpearl Aquarium
- Tri Nguyen Aquarium, Nha Trang
- Tuan Chau Aquarium, Ha Long Bay
- Vinpearl Underwater World, Nha Trang

== Caribbean ==
=== The Bahamas ===
- The Dig at Atlantis Paradise Island - Atlantis Paradise Island, Nassau

=== Bermuda ===
- Bermuda Aquarium, Museum and Zoo

=== Cuba ===
- Baconao Park
- Freshwater Public Aquarium, Havana

=== French Antilles ===
- Aquarium de la Guadeloupe - Gosier, Guadeloupe

== Europe ==
=== Austria ===
- Haus des Meeres - Vienna

=== Belgium ===
- Aquarium at the Antwerp Zoo - Antwerp
- Dubuisson Aquarium - Liège
- Sea Life Centre - Blankenberge

=== Bulgaria ===
- Varna Aquarium

=== Croatia ===
- Akvarij Crikvenica (Aquarium Crikvenica) - Crikvenica
- Akvarij Dubrovnik, Instituta za more i priobalje (Dubrovnik Aquarium, Institute for Marine and Coastal Research) - Dubrovnik
- Slatkovodni akvarij Aquatika Karlovac (Freshwater Aquarium Aquatika Karlovac) - Karlovac
- Aquarium Pula (Aquarium Pula) - Pula

=== Cyprus ===
- Ocean Aquarium - Famagusta

=== Czech Republic ===
- Mořský svět - Prague
- Obří akvárium - Hradec Králové
- Rajské ostrovy - Děčín

=== Denmark ===
- AQUA Akvarium & Dyrepark - Silkeborg
- Fisheries and Maritime Museum - Esbjerg
- Fjord & Bælt - Kerteminde
- Kattegatcentret - Grenå
- National Aquarium Denmark, Den Blå Planet - Kastrup
- Nordsøen Oceanarium - Hirtshals
- Øresundsakvariet - Helsingør
- Danmarks Akvarium - Charlottenlund

=== Finland ===
- Maretarium - Kotka
- Sea Life Helsinki, near the Linnanmäki Amusement Park - Helsinki
- Särkänniemi Aquarium - Tampere

=== France ===
See also #French Antilles, #New Caledonia and #Réunion

- Aquarium de La Rochelle - La Rochelle (2001)
- Aquarium de Paris - Cinéaqua - Paris (opened in 1867 as "Aquarium du Trocadéro", closed in 1985, re-opened as "Cinéaqua" in 2006)
- Grand Aquarium de Touraine - between Amboise and Tours, on the southern bank of the river Loire
- Aquarium de Lyon - Lyon
- Aquarium du Musée de Zoologie - Nancy (1970)
- Aquarium Mare Nostrum Montpellier - Montpellier (2007)
- L'Aquashow - Audierne (2000)
- Centre de la Mer et des Eaux (closed 2010) - Paris
- Citadel of Besançon - Besançon
- Dorée Tropical Aquarium (Aquarium tropical de la Porte Dorée) - in Palais de la Porte Dorée, Paris (1931)
- La Cité de la mer - Cherbourg (2002)
- Great Aquarium Saint-Malo (1996)
- Le Musée de la mer - Biarritz (1933)
- Nausicaä Centre National de la Mer (French National Sea Experience Centre) - Boulogne-sur-Mer (1991)
- Océanopolis - Brest (1990)
- Océarium - Le Croisic (1992)
- Sea Life Centre Paris - Marne la Vallée (2001)
- Seaquarium Le Grau du Roi - Petite Camargue (1989)

=== Germany ===
- Aquarium Berlin at the Berlin Zoological Garden – Berlin
- Aquazoo Löbbecke Museum – Düsseldorf
- Ozeaneum – Stralsund
- Sea Life Centre Berlin – Berlin
- Sea Life Centre Dresden – Dresden
- Sea Life Centre Hanover – Hanover
- Sea Life Centre Konstanz – Konstanz
- Sea Life Centre Munich – Munich
- Sea Life Centre Nuremberg – Nuremberg
- Sea Life Centre Oberhausen – Oberhausen
- Sea Life Centre Speyer – Speyer
- Sea Life Centre Timmendorfer Strand – Timmendorfer Strand
- Tropen-Aquarium Hagenbeck at the Tierpark Hagenbeck – Hamburg

=== Greece ===
- Aquaworld Aquarium - Hersonissos, Crete
- Cretaquarium - Crete
- Aquarium of Rhodes (hydrological station rhodes)

=== Hungary ===
- Tropicarium - Óceanárium - Budapest

=== Ireland ===
- List of zoos and aquariums in Ireland

=== Italy ===
- Alghero Aquarium - Alghero
- Acquario di Cala Gonone - Cala Gonone
- Aquarium of Cattolica, Cattolica
- Aquarium of Genoa - Genoa
- Aquarium of Livorno - Livorno
- Civic Aquarium of Milan - Milan
- Sea Life Gardaland, Gardaland, Lake Garda
- Stazione Zoologica di Napoli - Naples

=== Lithuania ===
- Lithuanian Sea Museum, Klaipėda

=== Luxembourg ===
- Wasserbillig Aquarium - Wasserbillig

=== Malta ===
- Malta National Aquarium - Qawra, Malta

=== Monaco ===
- Oceanographic Museum of Monaco - Monaco City

=== Netherlands ===
- Aqua Zoo Friesland - Leeuwarden
- Burgers Zoo - Arnhem
- Diergaarde Blijdorp (Oceanium) - Rotterdam
- Dolfinarium Harderwijk - Harderwijk
- Sea Life Centre - Scheveningen

=== Norway ===
- Atlanterhavsparken - Ålesund
- Bergen Aquarium - Bergen
- Polaria - Tromsø
- Risør Aquarium - Risør
- Sognefjord Akvarium - Sogndal

=== Poland ===
- Aquarium and Natural History Museum in Kraków - Kraków
- Aquarium in Kraków Zoo - Kraków
- Aquarium in Łódź - Łódź
- Aquarium in Warsaw Zoo - Warsaw
- Aquarium in Wroclaw Zoo - Wrocław
- Gdynia Aquarium - Gdynia
- Seal Sanctuary in Hel - Hel

=== Portugal ===
- Aquário Vasco da Gama - Algés
- Mora Freshwater Aquarium/Fluviário de Mora - Mora, Portugal, Alentejo (100 km east of Lisbon), opened 2007
- Lisbon Oceanarium - Lisbon
- Sea Life Porto - Porto

=== Romania ===
- Constanța Aquarium - Constanţa (1958)
- Acvariu Zoo Timișoara - Timișoara
- Danube Delta's Aquarium - Tulcea

=== Russia ===
- Akuliy Rif – Yeysk (2007)
- Gelendzhik Oceanarium – Gelendzhik (2007)
- Moscow Oceanarium – Moscow (2015)
- Murmansk Oceanarium (ru) – Murmansk (1991)
- Oceanarium in Saint Petersburg (ru) – Saint Petersburg (2006)
- Primorsky Oceanarium (ru) – Vladivostok (2016)
- Sochi Discovery World (ru) – Sochi (2009)
- Vladivostok Oceanarium (ru) – Vladivostok (1991)
- Voronezh Oceanarium (ru) – Voronezh (2011)

=== Slovenia ===
- Akvarij - terarij Maribor - Maribor
- Akvarij Piran - Piran

=== Spain ===
- Aquarium Barcelona - Barcelona
- Aquarium Donostia-San Sebastián - San Sebastián
- Aquarium Finisterrae - A Coruña
- Aquarium Gijón - Gijón
- Aquarium Poema del Mar - Las Palmas
- Aquarium Seville - Seville
- Aquopolis La Pineda
- Barcelona Zoo - Barcelona
- Cosmocaixa- Barcelona
- L'Oceanogràfic at the Ciutat de les Arts i les Ciències - Valencia
- Palma Aquarium - Palma de Mallorca
- River Aquarium - Zaragoza
- Sea Life Benalmádena - Benalmádena, Málaga
- Zoo Aquarium de Madrid - Madrid

=== Sweden ===
- Skansen Aquarium - Stockholm
- Universeum - Gothenburg
- Havets Hus - Lysekil
- Tropicarium Kolmården - Norrköping
- Malmö Museum Aquarium - Malmö

=== Turkey ===
- Antalya Aquarium - Antalya
- Sea World (Deniz Dünyası) - Ankara
- Aqua Vega - Ankara
- Eti Underwater World (Eti Sualtı Dünyası) - Eskişehir
- Istanbul Aquarium - Istanbul
- ViaSea Aquarium - Istanbul
- Emaar Aquarium & Underwater Zoo - Istanbul
- Aqua Diyarbakır - Diyarbakır
- Funtastic Aquarium İzmir - İzmir

=== Ukraine ===
- Kyiv's Oceanarium Morskaya Skazka - Kyiv
- Nemo Public Aquarium - Odesa, Kharkiv, Donetsk

=== United Kingdom ===
- List of zoological gardens and aquariums in United Kingdom

== Middle East ==
=== Iran ===
- Anzali Aquarium - Gilan Province
- Isfahan Aquarium - Isfahan Province
- Kish Aquarium - Kish island
- Tehran Aquarium - Jajrood, Tehran Province

=== Israel ===
- Coral World Underwater Observatory, Eilat
- Israel Aquarium, Jerusalem

=== Kuwait ===
- Kuwait Scientific Center - Salmiya, Kuwait City

=== Saudi Arabia ===
- Fakieh Aquarium - Jeddah (2013)

=== United Arab Emirates ===
- Dubai Aquarium and Underwater Zoo - Dubai
- The Lost Chambers - Dubai
- Sharjah Aquarium - Sharjah
- Dubai Dolphinarium - Dubai

== North America ==
=== Canada ===
- List of aquaria in Canada

=== Mexico ===
- Acuario Inbursa – Mexico City
- Gran Acuario Mazatlán – Mazatlán
- Acuario Michín – Puebla
- Acuario Michin Guadalajara – Guadalajara
- Acuario de Veracruz – Veracruz
- Acuario del Zoológico de Guadalajara – Guadalajara

=== United States ===
- List of aquaria in the United States

== Oceania ==
=== Australia ===
- List of aquaria in Australia

=== Guam ===
- Underwater World - Tumon

=== New Caledonia ===
- Aquarium des Lagons - Nouméa

=== New Zealand ===
- Kelly Tarlton's Sea Life Aquarium - Auckland
- National Aquarium of New Zealand - Napier

=== Palau ===
- Palau International Coral Reef Center - Koror

== South America ==
=== Argentina ===
- Mar del Plata Aquarium
- Mundo Marino

=== Brazil ===
- Oceanic Aquarium
- Acqua Mundo
- Aquário de São Paulo
- Aquario de Ubatuba
- Aquário Municipal de Santos
- Aquário de Natal
- Aquário da Paraíba
- Oceanário de Aracajú
- Aquario do Pantanal
- Aquário de Bonito
- Aquário de Justino Malheiros
- Aquário de Aparecida do Norte
- Aquário de Peruíbe
- Aquário do Rio São Francisco
- Aquário do Zoo de Baurú
- Aquário do Zoo do Rio de Janeiro
- Aquário Municipal de Campinas
- Aquário Municipal de Iacanga
- Aquário Municipal de Piracicaba
- Mundo das Águas
- AquaRio
- Aquario Marinho de Paranaguá
- Aquário Municipal de Rômulo Martinelli

=== Colombia ===
- Rodadero Sea Aquarium and Museum

=== Peru ===
- Acuario Nautilus
- Parque de la Imaginación

=== Venezuela ===
- Valencia Aquarium (Acuario de Valencia)

== See also ==
- List of AZA member zoos and aquariums
- List of botanical gardens
- List of CAZA member zoos and aquariums
- List of dolphinariums
- List of largest aquaria
- List of tourist attractions worldwide
- List of zoos by country
