= Acuario Michin Guadalajara =

Aquarium in Guadalajara, Jalisco, Mexico

- Logo
- Interactive map of Acuario Michin Guadalajara
- 20°41′34.5″N 103°21′5″W
- Date opened: 2017
- Location: Guadalajara, Jalisco, Mexico
- Land area: 32,000 square feet
- No. of animals: 10,000
- No. of species: 300
- Volume of largest tank: 750,000 liters
- Director: Paulina Balbontín Durón
- Website: acuariomichin.com/guadalajara/

Acuario Michin Guadalajara is an aquarium in Guadalajara, in the Mexican state of Jalisco.

== History ==
Acuario Michin Guadalajara was built in order to attract tourists to the area. Almost 300 million pesos (over 14 million US dollars) were invested in the aquarium, which is located near Parque Alcalde. Construction began in 2015, and it opened during March of 2017. Originally, there were plans for an aquarium to be built in nearby Puerto Vallarta, but there were concerns that it would not get enough visitors with the aquarium in Guadalajara being built. Eventually, plans for an aquarium in Puerto Vallarta were scrapped.

In 2018, the aquarium became the first in the country to successfully breed neotropical river otters.

== Exhibits ==
The aquarium is divided into five sections, each named after a pre-Hispanic Mexican civilization: Wixárika, Maya, Mixtec, Konkaak, and Olmeca.

- Wixárika Pavilion: Features freshwater species, reptiles, and amphibians, including axolotls.
- Maya Pavilion: Features species native to coral reefs, including clownfish.
- Mixtec Pavilion: Features some semiaquatic species such as crocodiles and neotropical otters. This pavilion also contains an aviary where visitors can feed budgerigars, opportunities to feed tilapia and carp, and a petting zoo called Achcalli Farm. that was added in 2019. The petting zoo received an expansion in 2021 that added several new species, including flamingos, ducks, turtles, capybaras, and miniature pigs. Visitors can pay extra for a crocodile feeding experience, as well as a giant rabbit interaction.
- Konkaak Pavilion: Features colder water species from the Pacific, including jellyfish.
- Olmeca Pavilion: Features species from the Gulf of Mexico, including several species of shark, such as bull sharks, nurse sharks, and blacktip reef sharks. Other species in the pavilion include yellowfin surgeonfish and the Northern red snapper. The aquarium allows guests to dive in the shark tank for an additional cost.

There is a sixth section in the aquarium called Marine Challenges, which consists of various games and physical activities, including laser tag, rock-climbing, trampolines, an obstacle course, and an arcade.

== Conservation ==
Acuario Michin Guadalajara participates in several conservation programs, including breeding programs for axolotls and neotropical otters. They work closely with several environmental organizations, including Tapitas Bank, Pelagios Kakunjá, and local indigenous-lead groups. The aquarium has also served as a home for nonreleasable neotropical otters.
