= List of aquaria in India =

Aquariums are facilities where aquatic animals are confined within tanks and displayed to the public, and in which they may also be bred.

== List ==
This is a list of aquariums open to public in India.

Name	City	State	Ref.
Bagh-e-Bahu Aquarium	Jammu	Jammu and Kashmir	
Bengaluru Aquarium	Bengaluru	Karnataka	
Calcutta Aquarium	Kolkata	West Bengal	
Central Institute of Freshwater Aquaculture Aquarium	Bhubaneswar	Odisha	
District Tourism Promotion Council Aquarium	Kozhikode	Kerala	
Ganga Aquarium	Lucknow	Uttar Pradesh	
Jagdishchandra Bose Aquarium	Surat	Gujarat	
Jawahar Aquarium	Mussoorie	Uttarakhand	
Kankaria Aquarium	Ahmedabad	Gujarat	
Kerala University of Fisheries and Ocean Studies Aquarium	Kochi	Kerala	
Kollam Aquarium	Kollam	Kerala	
Lal Bagh aquarium	Bengaluru	Karnataka	
Machhli Ghar	Bhopal	Madhya Pradesh	
MARC Aquarium	Digha	West Bengal	
Marine Biological Research Station	Ratnagiri	Maharashtra	
Marine Kingdom	Chennai	Tamil Nadu	
Marine Life Aquarium	Chennai	Tamil Nadu	
Matsyadarsini Aquarium	Visakhapatnam	Andhra Pradesh	
Nandankanan Zoo	Bhubaneswar	Odisha	
Sanjay Gandhi Jaivik Udyan	Patna	Bihar	
Star Aquarium	Karunagappalli	Kerala	
Taraporewala Aquarium	Mumbai	Maharashtra	
Travancore Royal Aquarium	Trivandrum	Kerala	
Vandalur Zoo	Chennai	Tamil Nadu	
Varkala Aquarium	Trivandrum	Kerala	

Sagarika Marine Research Aquarium, Vizhinjam RC of ICAR-CMFRI	Trivandrum	Kerala

== See also ==
- List of botanical gardens in India
- List of aquaria
