= Sea Life Busan Aquarium =

Aquarium in Busan, South Korea

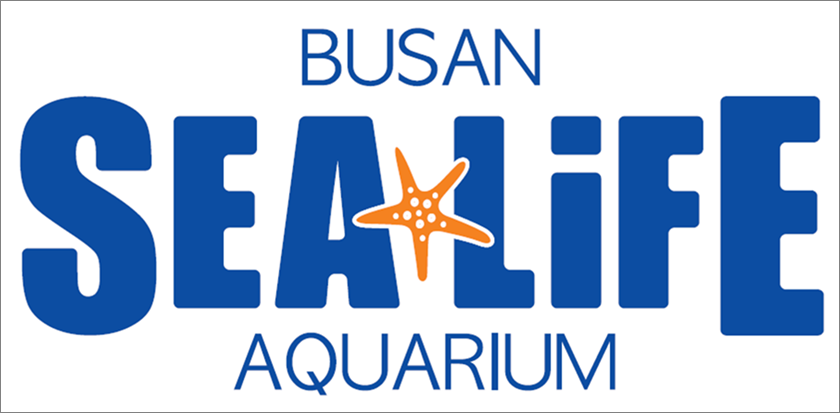

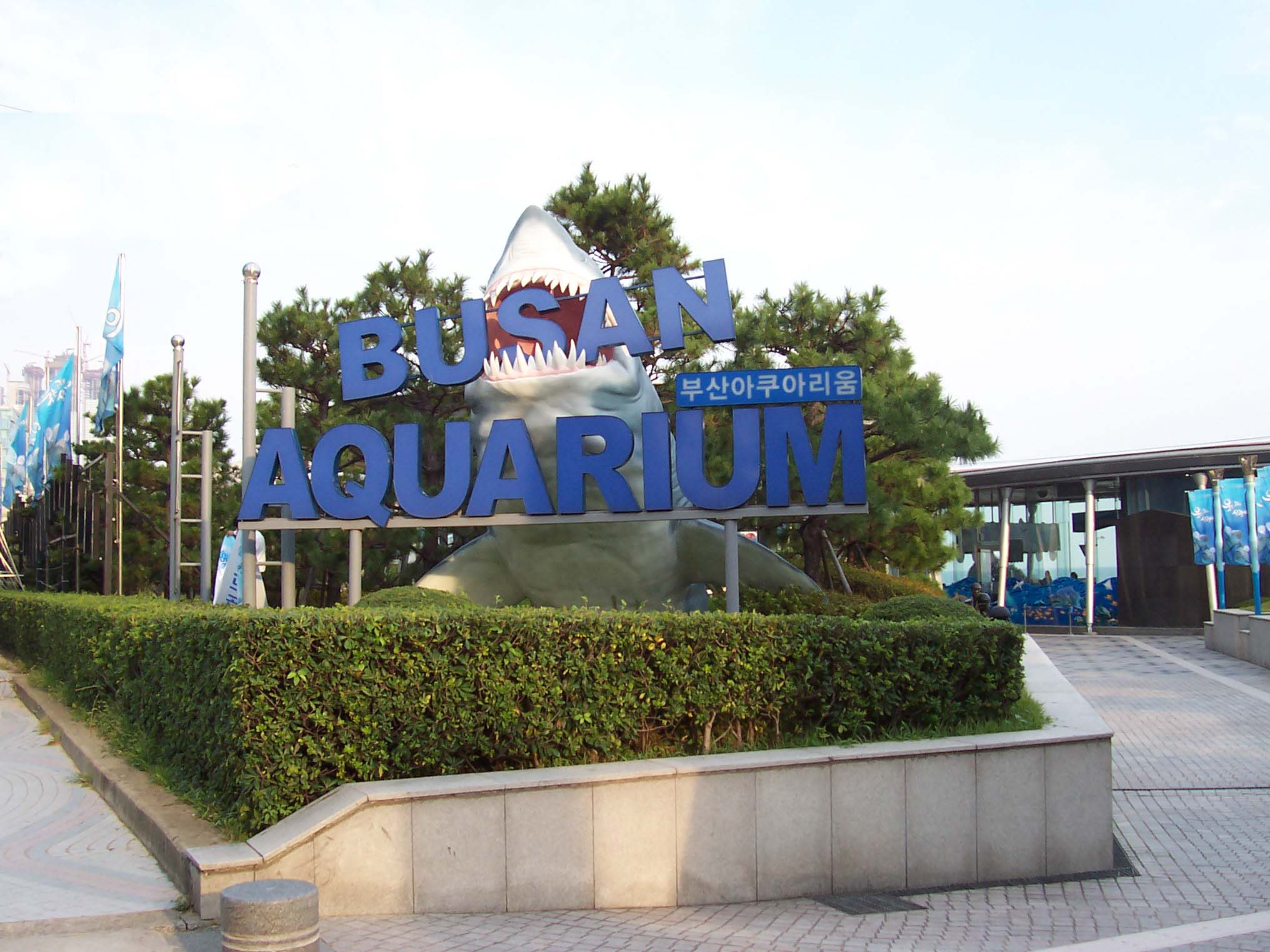
- Interactive map of Sea Life Busan Aquarium
- 35.159339°N 129.16101°E
- Location: Haeundae Beach, South Korea
- No. of animals: 35,000
- No. of species: 250
- Volume of largest tank: 3,000,000 litres (793,000 US gal)
- Total volume of tanks: 3,500,000 litres (925,000 US gal)
- Website: www.busanaquarium.com

Sea Life Busan Aquarium (Korean: 부산 아쿠아리움; lit. 'Busan Aquarium') is an aquarium located in Haeundae Beach, Busan, South Korea. It first opened on November 7, 2001.

== Description ==
There are about 250 species and up to 35,000 marine animals on display. The main tank contains 3,000,000 litres (790,000 US gal) of water, and the animals can be viewed through acrylic windows or from the 80-metre (260 ft) underwater tunnel. There are 40 exhibits, which include penguins, otters, piranha, sea jellies and a touch tank for a close up "hands on" look at a variety of sea creatures.

== Ownership ==
Busan Aquarium is a joint project between Living and Leisure Australia (LLA) and the local government. This is the first major tourism undertaking with a local government under the Private Investment Promotion of Infrastructure Law.

Living and Leisure Australia has since been acquired by Merlin Entertainments, the world's second largest attraction operator. The LLA Group has extensive experience in aquarium operations and owns four other aquariums: UnderWater World, Queensland, Melbourne Aquarium, Siam Ocean World, and Chang Feng Ocean World, Shanghai. It also manages the Dubai Aquarium and Under Water Zoo under a management contract from the United Arab Emirates.

Since February 5, 2010, Busan Aquarium has formed a sister building tie-up with Aqua World.

Busan Aquarium has been rebranded as Sea Life Busan Aquarium as of 1 July 2014.

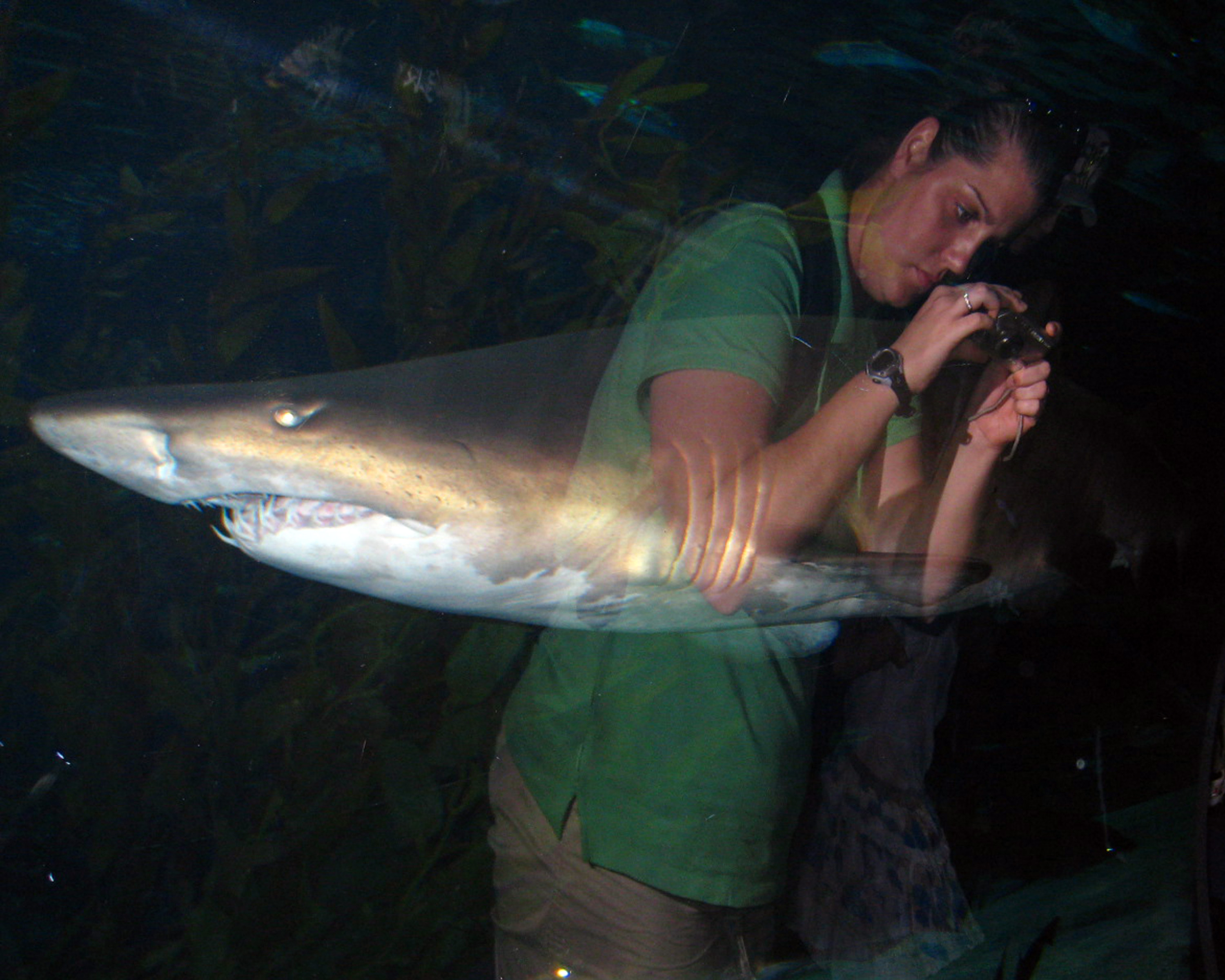

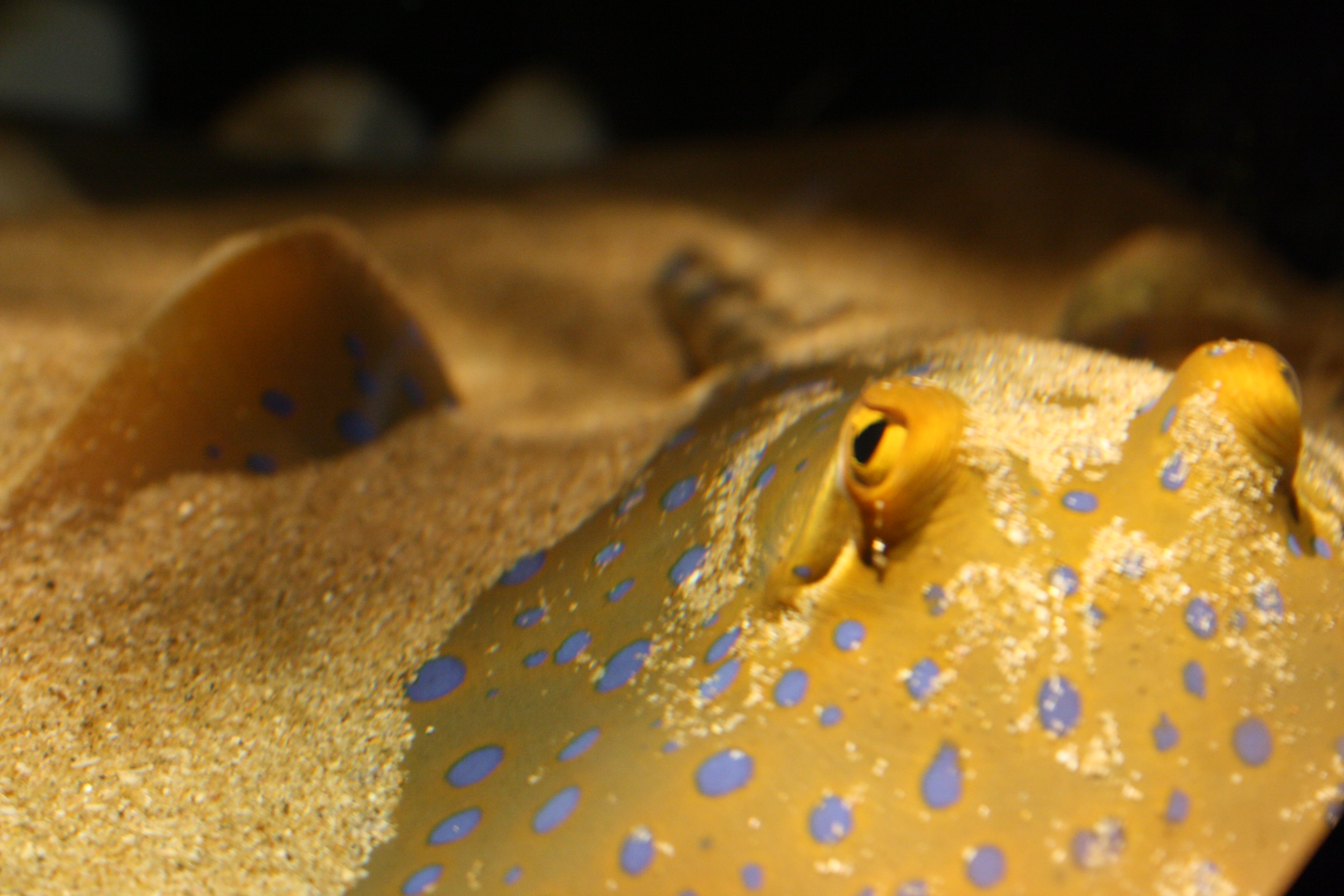

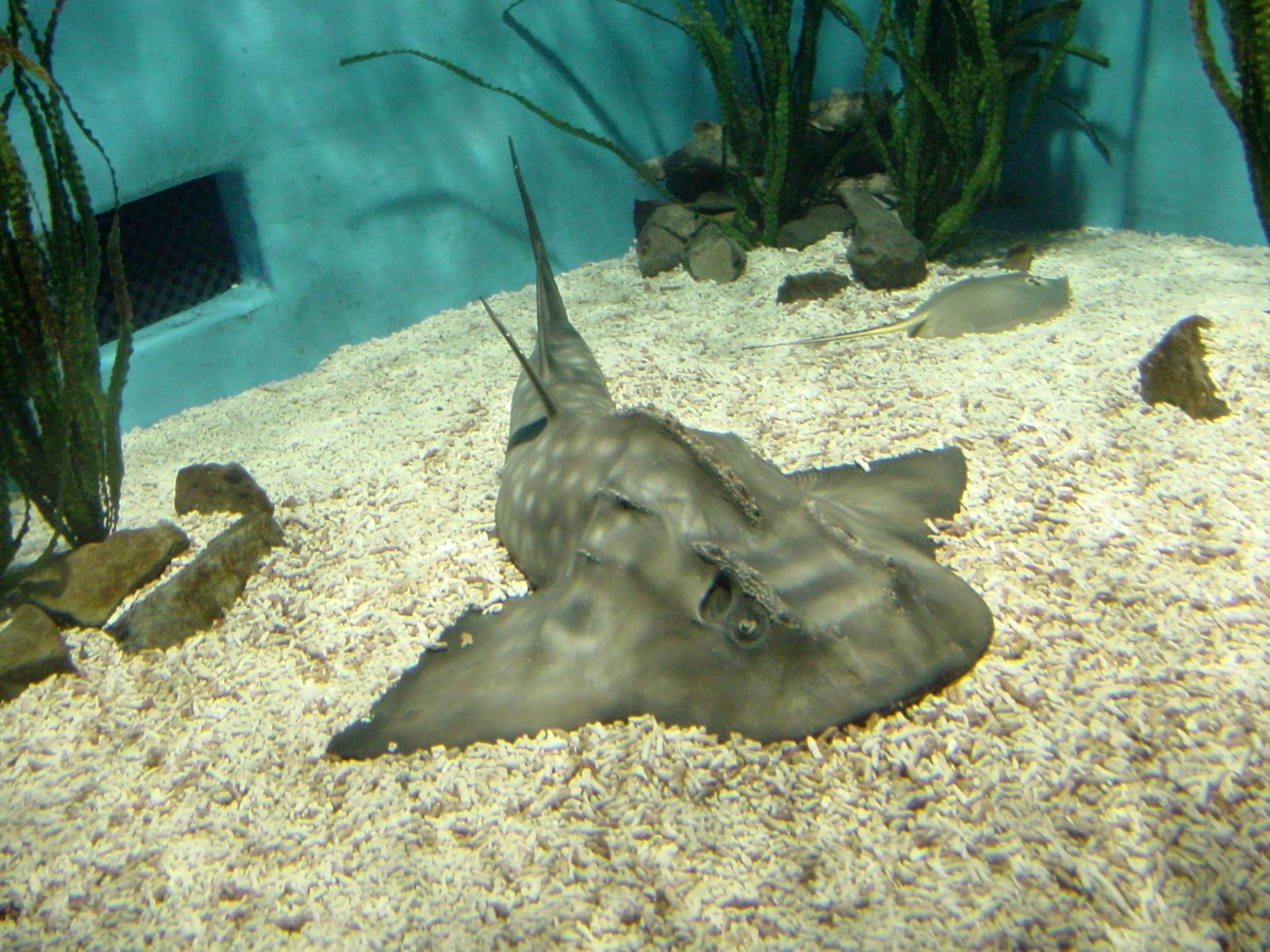

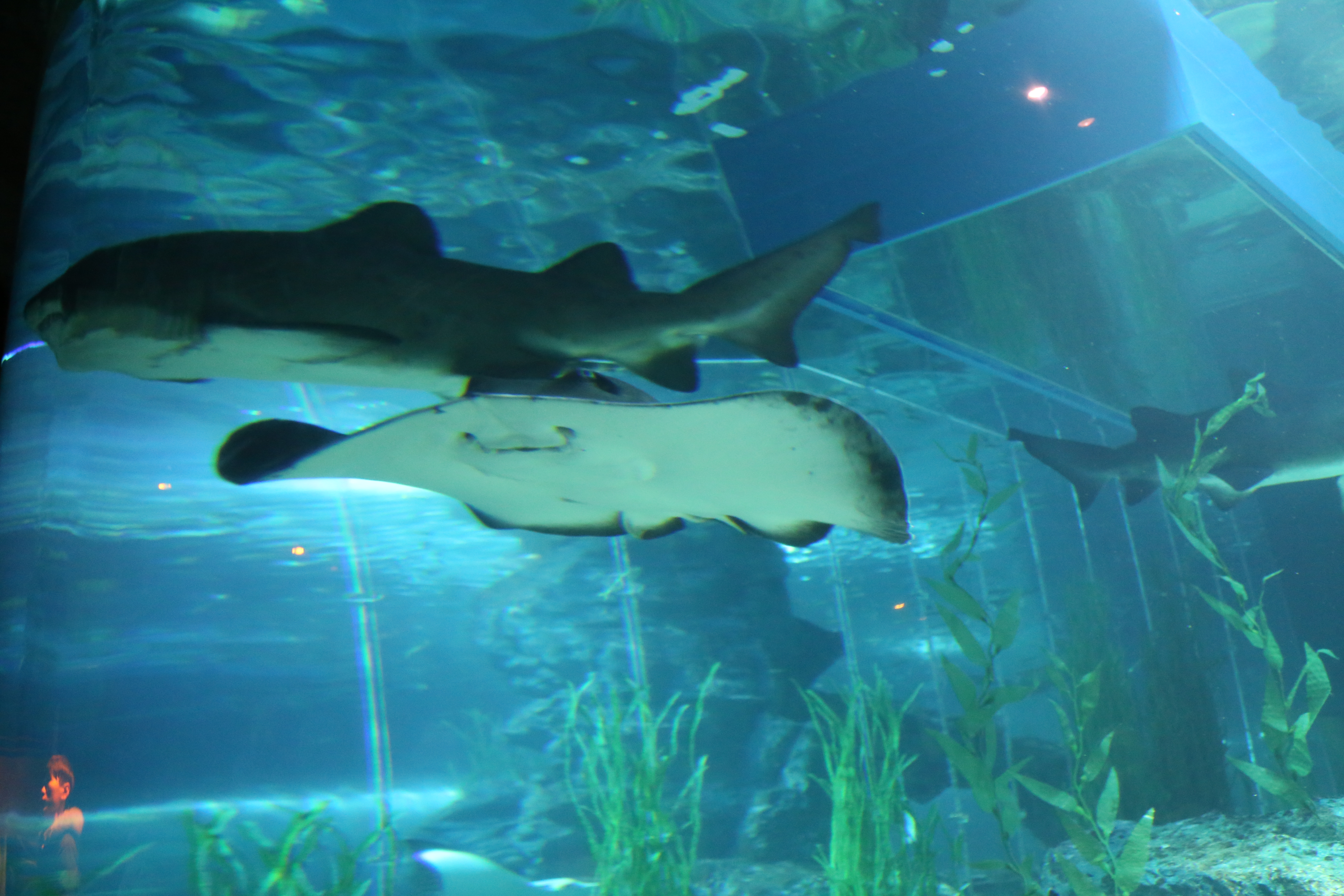

== See also ==
- List of South Korean tourist attractions
