= Wasserbillig Aquarium =

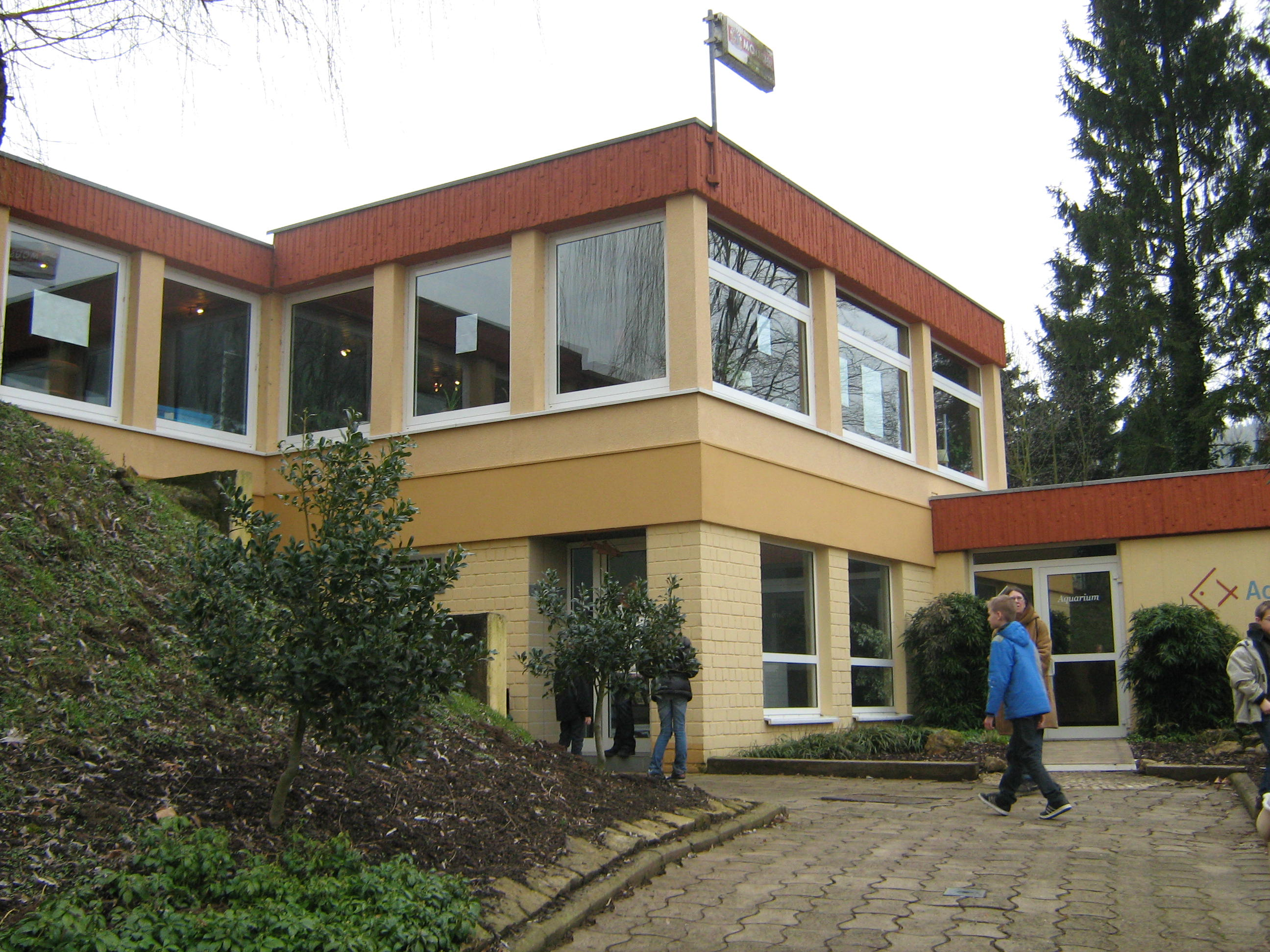
- Interactive map of Wasserbillig Aquarium
- 49°43′00″N 6°30′08″E
- Date opened: 1975
- Location: Wasserbillig, Luxembourg
- Volume of largest tank: 40,000 L (11,000 US gal)
- Website: aquarium.wasserbillig.lu/Deutsch/Rundgang-Aquarium.html

The Wasserbillig Aquarium is located in Wasserbillig, a small town in the east of Luxembourg on the German border. It consists of 15 tanks ranging in size from 300 to 40,000 litres (79 to 10,567 US gal), with fish from all five continents in their natural surroundings. Among the more exotic varieties are angelfish, neon tetra, the colourful Japanese koi and percidae from South America. But there are also species from closer to home, including eel, bream, gudgeon, asp, tench and zander.

Set on a hill overlooking the River Sauer, the aquarium also has a restaurant and a children's playground. It is open from 10 am to 5 pm every day from Easter until the end of September, the rest of the year it is open only on Fridays, Saturdays and Sundays.
