= Israel Aquarium =

Zoo in Amman Jordan

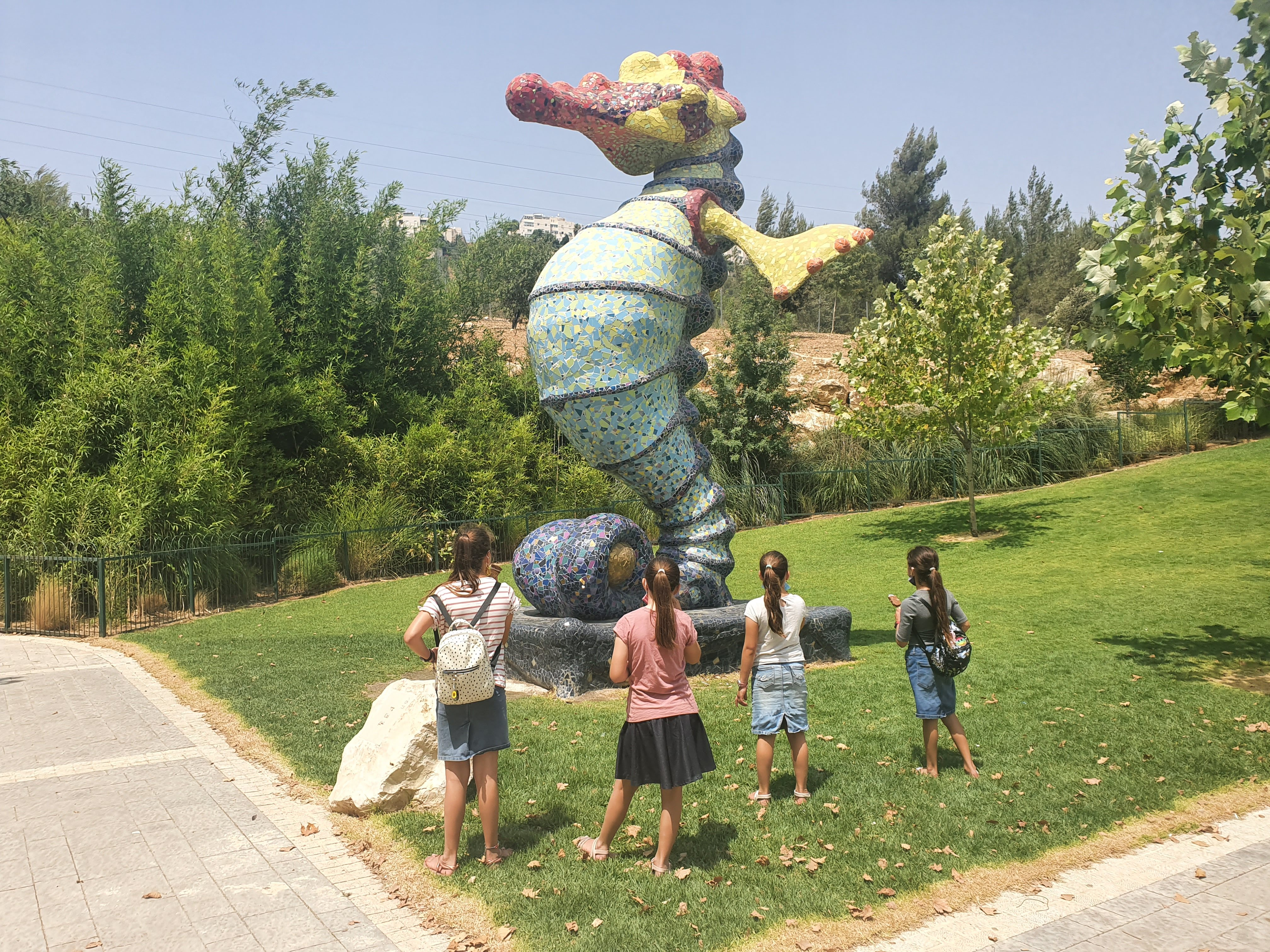
- Interactive map of Israel Aquarium
- 31°44′46.4″N 35°10′38.7″E
- Date opened: June 19, 2017
- Location: Jerusalem, Israel
- Land area: 6500m²
- Website: www.israel-aquarium.org.il

The Gottesman Family Israel Aquarium is a public aquarium in Jerusalem, Israel that was opened on June 19, 2017. The aquarium focuses on Israel's marine environment - the Red Sea, the Mediterranean Sea, the Sea of Galilee, and the Dead Sea. The aquarium was built by the Tish family Zoolgocical Gardens in Jerusalem (The Biblical Zoo) and located next it.

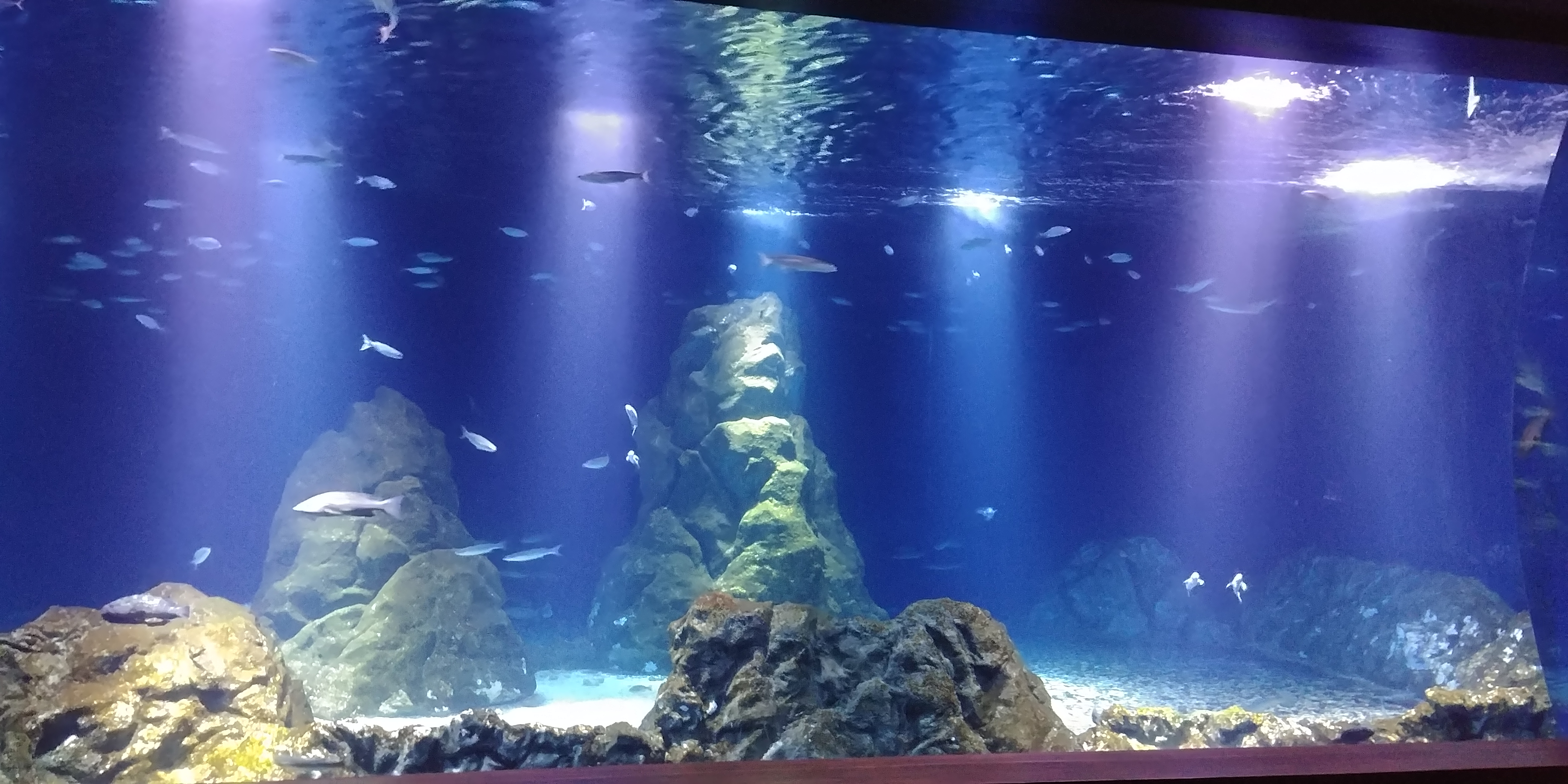
The appearance of the Israeli aquarium

== History ==
In 2008, when the Biblical Zoo received a tract of expansion land, planning for the zoo's future began. It was decided that the first "anchor project" in the expansion area of the Biblical Zoo would be the aquarium. Israel’s National Biodiversity Plan had recommended establishing the first aquarium in Israel to promote public awareness of the preservation of marine habitats and species.

From the outset, it was decided that the aquarium will focus on presenting the habitats and marine environment of Israel. The project was awarded the temporary name, "Sea Israel" or "Yam LeYam". A preliminary sum of money was raised to examine the feasibility of the idea. After completion of the initial planning process, in collaboration with OK Bay Consulting in Oklahoma, USA, the program was presented to the Gottesman Family Foundation, in New York, USA, which approved the project and agreed to donate $11 million.

The Gottesman Family of New York, donors from Israel and around the world, The Jerusalem Municipality, and the Ministry of Tourism all funded the aquarium's construction. The total cost of construction stands at 100 million ILS. The project was designed by architect Lenny Raviv of the Raviv Tal architects with Ok Bay Consulting the zoo staff, and experts from around the world.

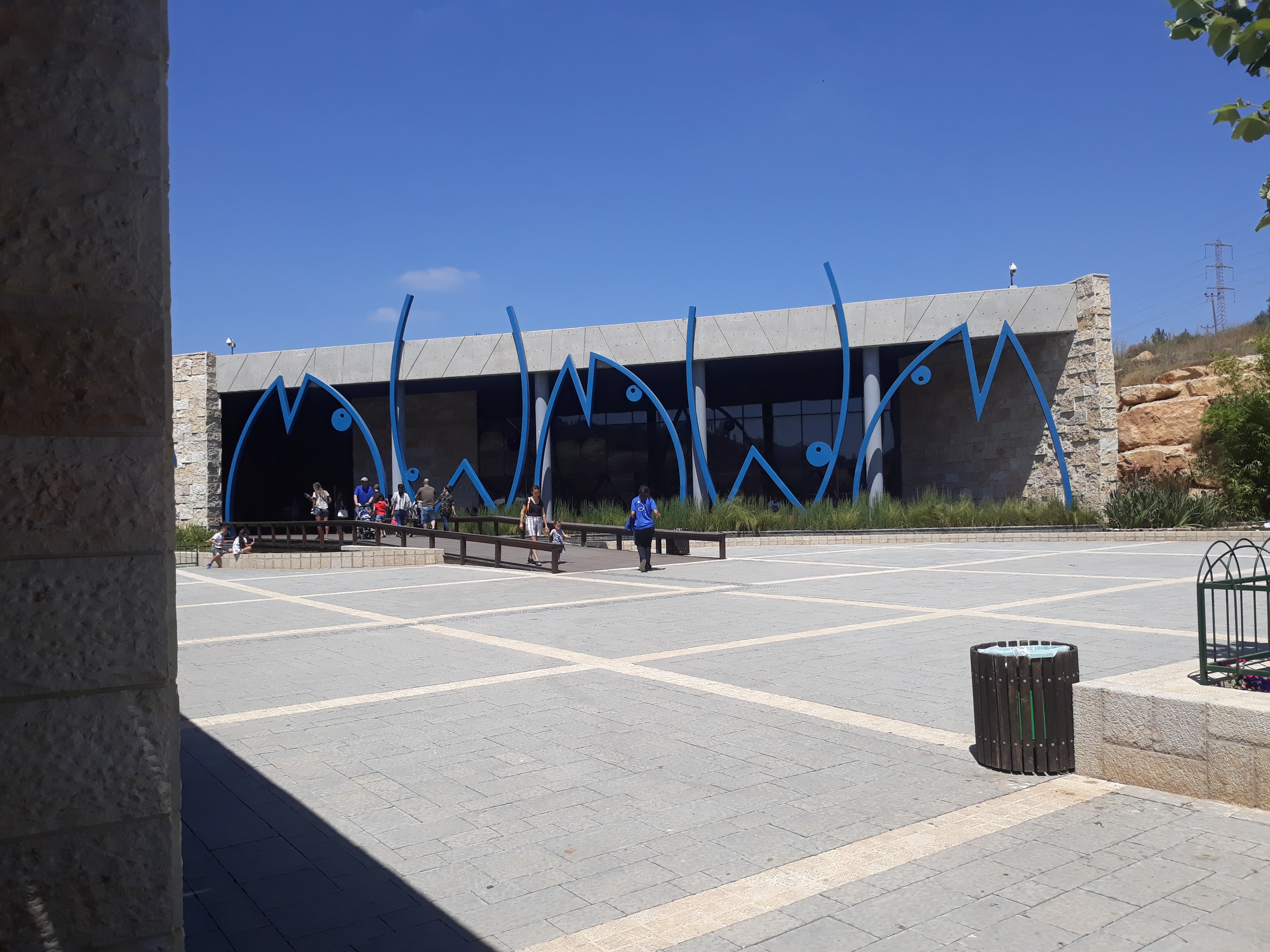
The entrance hall

The aquarium is built on an area of 6,500 square meters and features many different exhibits:

- Entrance Hall – The entrance hall includes an information booth and locker room. This hall contains the first exhibit - a schooling display with hundreds of fish.
- Four Seas of Israel Gallery – This gallery presents the seas of Israel - the Sea of Galilee, the Red Sea, the Mediterranean Sea, and the Dead Sea. The Sea of Galilee exhibit displays Oreochromis aureus and the Dead Sea has a dry exhibit framed. In the Mediterranean Sea exhibit, presented in seaside ruins that resemble the Caesarea area, contains gilt-head sea bream (Denis) fish. In the Red Sea, several dozen lionfish of two species are exhibited.
- Mediterranean Coast Exhibit – This exhibit presents the Israeli seashore that is divided into two habitats - the rocky seashore and the sandy beach.
- Discovery Gallery – The Discovery Gallery contains various smaller exhibits that introduce aspects of marine habitats. In the first exhibit, there is a shipwreck and a gas or oil drill, and a band of barbed wire. In the open pool, visitors can feed common stingrays. Around the pool different exhibits contain seahorses, stonefish, frogfish and ribbon eels.
- Mediterranean Sea Gallery – The gallery contains Mediterranean fish species such as mullet, ray and eel species. The exhibit also includes a large tank with an underwater viewing tunnel and a hall with a viewing window.
- Suez Canal Film Gallery – The Gallery connecting the Mediterranean and the Red Sea galleries shows a four-minute film documentary explaining the construction of the Suez Canal and its environmental effects. The film focuses mainly on the phenomenon of Lessepsian migration - migration of species from the Red Sea to the Mediterranean.
- First Red Sea Gallery – This gallery contains hundreds of clownfish. These fish came from a special breeding farm in the Arava. There are other species such as Naso tangs and a unique exhibit of living corals.
- Jellyfish Gallery – A hallway with several different species of jellyfish.
- Second Red Sea Gallery – At the base of this gallery is a big exhibit showing the coral reefs of the Red Sea off the beaches of the city of Eilat. The exhibition includes hundreds of fish of different species, such as clown coris, zebra sharks, porcupine fish, puffer fish, sergeant fish, triggerfish, colorful wrasses and more. This gallery also has an exhibit of lobster and eel species.
- Shell Collection – The aquarium features a large collection of shells from around the world.
