= Sea Life Benalmádena =

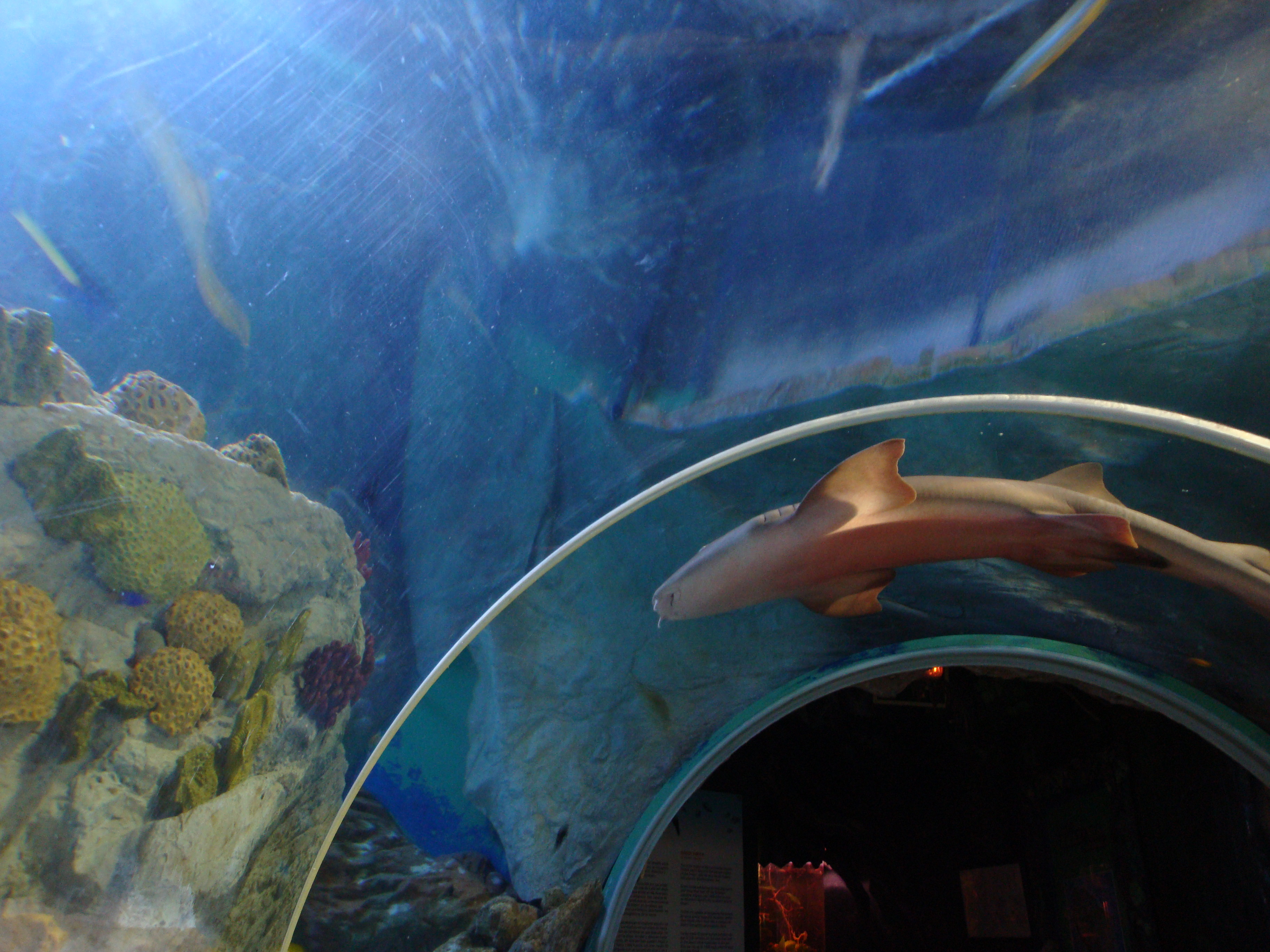
- Underwater tunnel
- Interactive map of Sea Life Benalmádena
- 36.59885°N 4.514074°W
- Location: Benalmádena, Andalusia, Spain
- Website: www.visitsealife.com/Benalmadena/en

Sea Life Benalmádena is an aquarium located in Benalmádena (suburb of Málaga) in Andalusia, Spain.

It is one of the Sea Life Centres in Europe, which are owned by Merlin Entertainments.
