= Rodadero Sea Aquarium and Museum =

- Logo of the aquarium

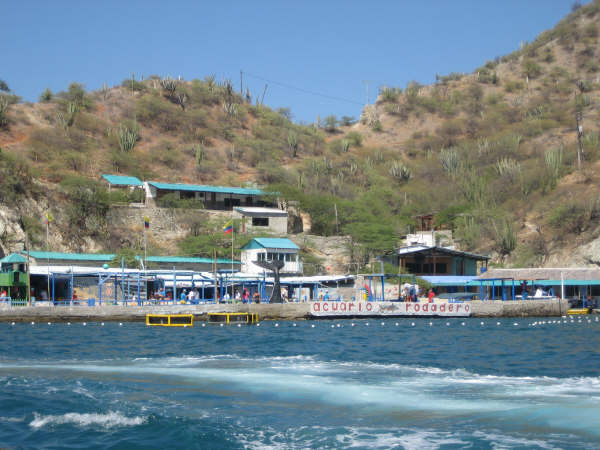
- View of the Aquarium from a motorboat
- Interactive map of Rodadero Sea Aquarium and Museum
- 11.216969°N 74.237151°W
- Date opened: 1965
- Location: Santa Marta, Magdalena, Colombia
- No. of animals: 805
- Memberships: IMATA, ACOPAZOA, RNM
- Major exhibits: Dolphin display and Tairona exhibit.
- Website: www.acuariorodadero.com

The Rodadero Sea Aquarium and Museum (Spanish: Acuario y Museo del Mar del Rodadero) is a public aquarium and maritime museum located in the Inca Inca Cove off the Rodadero beach in Santa Marta, Colombia. It was opened in 1965 by Captain Francisco Ospina Navia. The aquarium is part of the National Network of Museums of Colombia and part of ACOPAZOA, the Colombian branch of the World Association of Zoos and Aquariums. Accessible mainly by motorboat, the aquarium has 13 pools with direct connection to the Caribbean Sea, and 15 glass aquaria that contain over 805 animals that include sharks, sea turtles, dolphins, sea lions, crustaceans, fishes and seabirds, 98% of which are native to the area.

The Aquarium also contains a museum section that exhibits dissected specimens and nautical equipment, as well as an exhibition that focuses on the pre-columbine culture of the Taironas and their connection to the sea.

== See also ==
- Tayrona National Natural Park
