= Nordsøen Oceanarium =

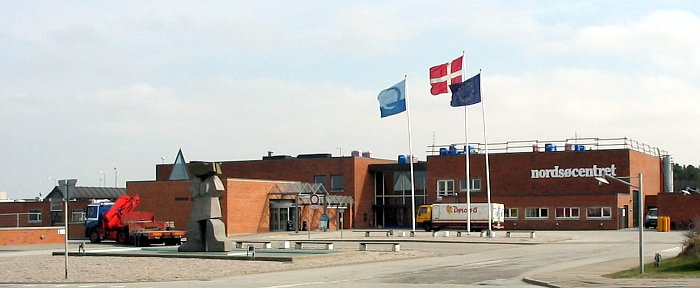
- Interactive map of Nordsøen Oceanarium
- 57.5866°N 9.9800°E
- Date opened: 1998
- Location: Hirtshals, Denmark
- No. of species: 70 (fish only, not counting mammals and invertebrates)
- Volume of largest tank: 4,500,000 litres (1,200,000 US gal)
- Website: en.nordsoenoceanarium.dk

Nordsøen Oceanarium is a public aquarium and museum that opened in 1998 on the shores of the North Sea (Nordsøen in Danish) in Hirtshals, north Jutland, Denmark. Their main tank, which holds 4,500,000 litres (1,200,000 US gal), is the largest in Northern Europe, but the Oceanarium also has several smaller habitat aquariums and an exhibit with seals. Species displayed are native to the oceans around Denmark.

The Oceanarium is part of the Nordsøcentre, which also houses a conference centre.

== History ==
The Oceanarium was opened in 1998. It was destroyed by fire in December 2003 and reopened in July 2005.

== Exhibits ==
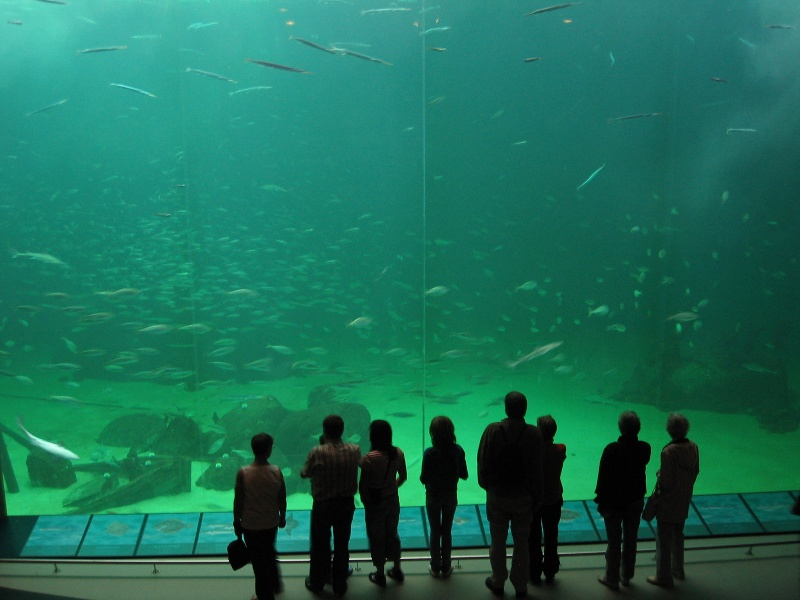
The centre tank in the oceanarium

=== The centre tank ===
The large elliptical tank in the centre of the museum's old building measures 22 by 33 metres (72 by 108 ft) and holds 4,500,000 litres (1,200,000 US gal) of water. The centre tank was designed to resemble the open sea in the North Sea, and specially to hold schooling, pelagic fish. It is also a "show-room" for displaying large specimens of some of the species which are also seen in the habitat tanks – for example cod, saithe, turbot and sea-bass. Other large species in the tank are spiny dogfish, skates, and ocean sunfish. In total, there are about 2–3000 fish in this tank.

=== Habitat tanks ===
Twelve tanks, varying in size from 4,000 to 16,000 litres (1,100 to 4,200 US gal), present different habitats from the North Sea - from the sandy bottom by the jetties to the muddy seafloor at several hundred metres in the Norwegian Trench between Denmark and Norway.

In each tank fish and other sea animals which can be found in that particular habitat are shown. The oceanarium tries to make the bottom and the surroundings as authentic as possible, however with the appropriate compromises.

=== Theme tanks ===
In addition to the centre tank and habitat tanks the oceanarium has a large number of theme-tanks with fish or other marine animals, which may contain animals which are impossible to show in other tanks, or animals subject to special theme exhibitions; an example would be the exhibition "Creepy Crawlies". Here the oceanarium presents different invertebrates. With special "bio-scanners", visitors are able to see details of the animals not possible with the naked eye.

Other theme-tanks contain small fish found in shallow water. In the Activity area there are tanks which staff biologists use for demonstrations.

=== Sealarium ===
In the Oceanarium's large outdoor seal pool, the Sealarium, visitors can get close to the two seal species common in Danish waters – the harbour seal and the grey seal. The Sealarium contains 800,000 litres (210,000 US gal) of seawater which is continually renewed.
