= Mactan Island Aquarium =

Coordinates: 10°17′07″N 123°59′49″E

- Interactive map of Mactan Island Aquarium
- Date opened: October 2008
- Location: Lapu-Lapu, Cebu
- Major exhibits: 30

Mactan Island Aquarium is a public aquarium in Lapu-Lapu, Cebu.

The aquarium museum has been open since October 2008 and has over 30 exhibits showcasing Cebu's aquatic life from snakes to sharks.

The aquarium has recently completed a transfer from Barangay Basak to Barangay Maribago, still on Mactan Island. The new larger site is between White Sands Resort and EGI City by the Sea Condos.
