= Qingdao Aquarium =

Aquarium in Qingdao, China

Coordinates: 36.05686°N 120.33597°E

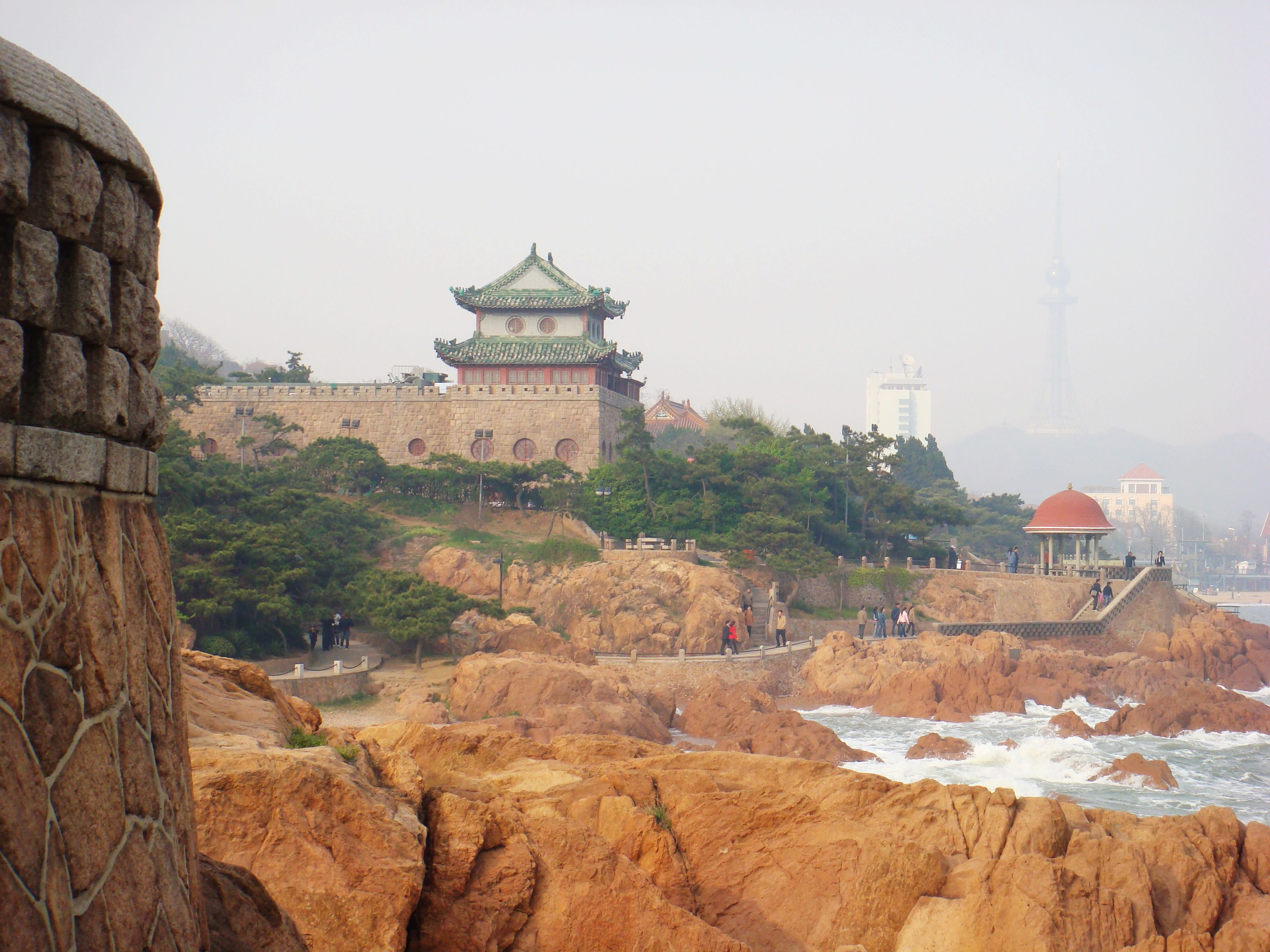
The Qingdao Aquarium seen from the west in 2007.

The Qingdao Aquarium (Chinese: 青岛水族馆; pinyin: Qīngdǎo Shuǐzúguǎn) also known as the Qingdao Underwater World (Chinese: 青岛海底世界; pinyin: Qīngdǎo Hǎidǐ Shìjiè) is the oldest public aquarium in China. It is located in the city of Qingdao, Shandong Province. The aquarium originated from an initiative launched by the educator Cai Yuanpei in 1930 and was first opened to the public on May 8, 1932. As of 2013, the aquarium consists of four main exhibition halls that are connected by tunnels and provides nearly 10,000 square meters of total exhibition area. The Qingdao Aquarium has been listed as a major historical and cultural sites protected by Shandong Province since 2006 (site number 3-267). It is located right on shore of the Yellow Sea's Huiquan Bay (汇泉湾), next to the "No. 1 Bathing Beach" in the Shinan District of Qingdao.

The aquarium, opening from 8:30 am to 5 pm, consists of the major aquarium, the sea animal performance museum, the museum of freshwater animals, and the herbarium of marine organisms.

== See also ==
- Major historical and cultural sites protected by Shandong Province
