= Rayong Aquarium =

- Interactive map of Rayong Aquarium
- 12.6094°N 101.423°E
- Date opened: 1986
- Location: Rayong, Thailand
- Website: www.fisheries.go.th/fisheries/aq/webplace1.php?hidAQCode=00000012

The Rayong Aquarium (Thai: สถานแสดงพันธุ์สัตว์น้ำระยอง) is a public aquarium in the town of Rayong, Rayong Province, Thailand. It is located by the bay of Ban Phe. Owned and operated jointly by the Department of Fisheries of Thailand and the Eastern Marine Fisheries Research and Development Center, the aquarium hosts 43 aquarium tanks with the capacity of 1-4 tons each, an underwater glass tunnel, an outdoor shark and ray pond, a shell museum, and fishing boat exhibitions.

The aquarium keeps various kinds of fish and sea plants, while the centre conducts research on marine biology and behaviors of marine life.
