= Aquaworld Aquarium =

- Interactive map of Aquaworld Aquarium
- 35°19′01.36″N 25°23′21.39″E
- Date opened: 1995
- Location: Hersonissos, Heraklion, Crete, Greece
- Website: www.aquaworld-crete.com

Aquaworld Aquarium is a natural history museum in Hersonissos, Heraklion, Crete, Greece. Founded in 1995, Aquaworld was founded and developed by Scotsman John Bryce McLaren. The majority of the animals on display are either rescued or were unwanted pets which now have a home in this environment.

Aquaworld encourages interest in the rescued creatures within their recreated natural habitat and is open daily from 1 April until 31 October each year. It is one of only three aquariums in Greece.
