= Poema del Mar =

Coordinates: 28.1446°N 15.4283°W

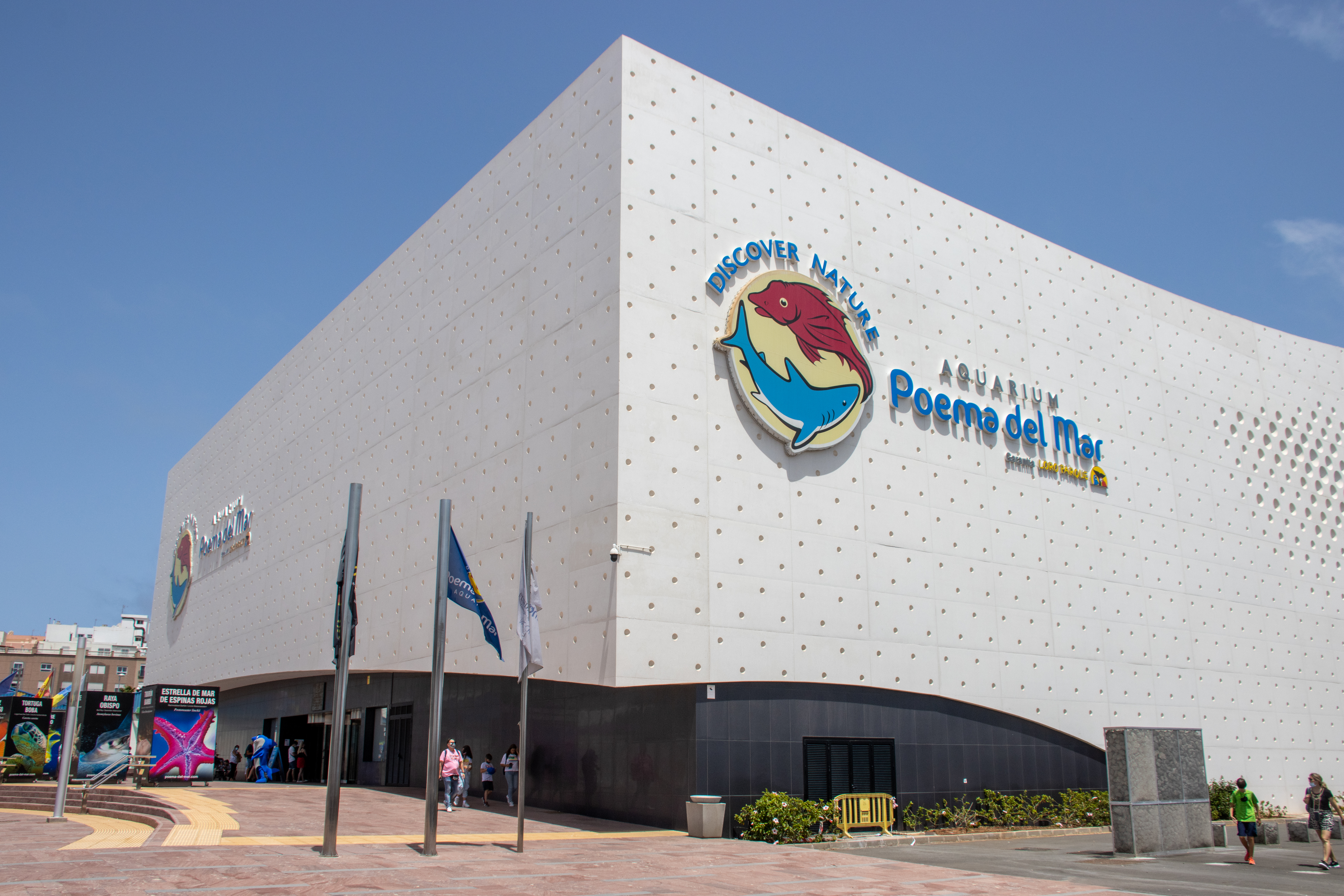
- Interactive map of Poema del Mar
- Location: Las Palmas de Gran Canaria
- Land area: 12,500 m^{2} (135,000 sq ft)
- No. of species: 350
- Website: http://www.poema-del-mar.com/index.php/en

The Poema del Mar (Spanish for "Poem of the Sea") is an aquarium in Las Palmas, Canary Islands, Spain. It was inaugurated on December 17, 2017. The Gran Canaria Town Council and the Government of the Canary Islands have considered it of strategic interest to the region by promoting the islands as an international travel destination. It is owned by the Loro Parque Group.

== Features ==
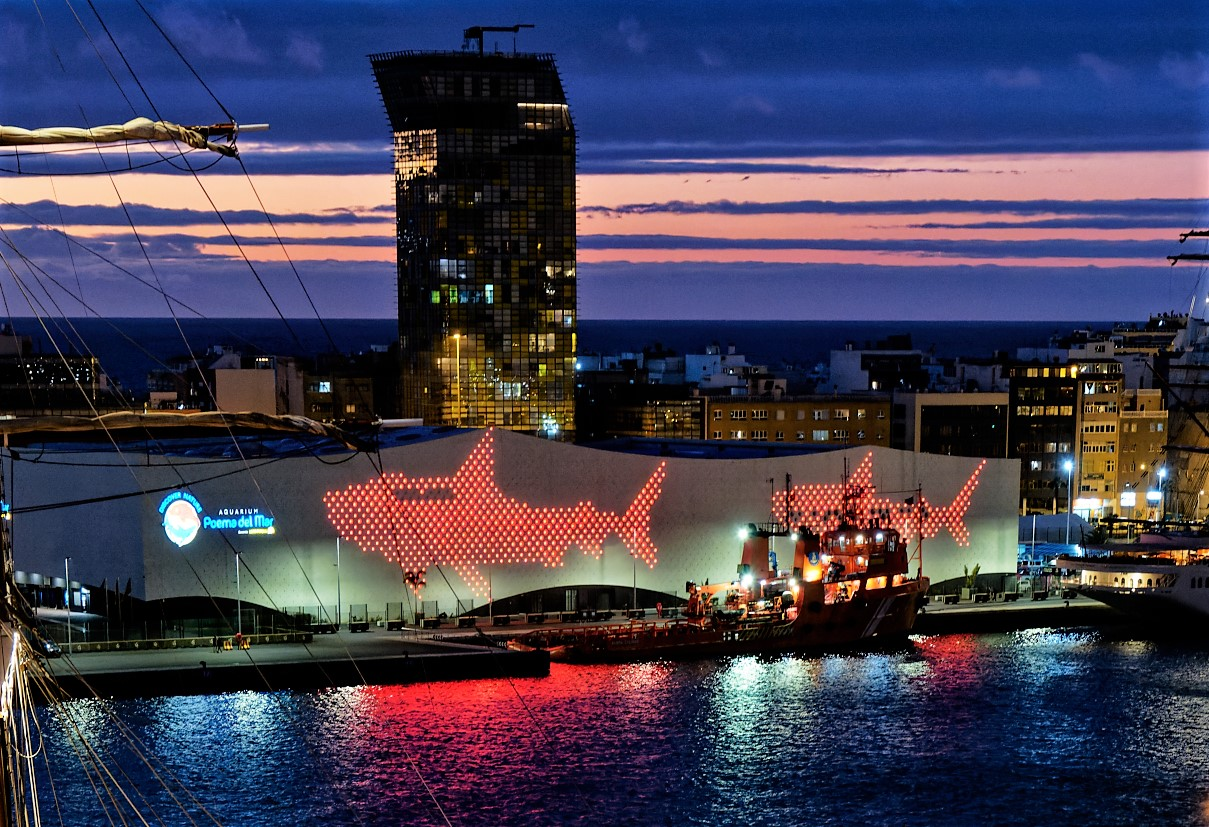
Opening, 2017

Located within the premises of the Port of Light and Las Palmas, it consists of a 12,500 m^{2} building inspired by the designs of Nestor Martín-Fernández de la Torre, whose pictorial work "Poem of the Atlantic" inspires the name of the aquarium.

It consists of three large differentiated zones: surface marine ecosystems, deep marine, and freshwater. There are 35 ecosystems represented in different aquariums totaling 7.5 million liters of water, distributed in three areas:

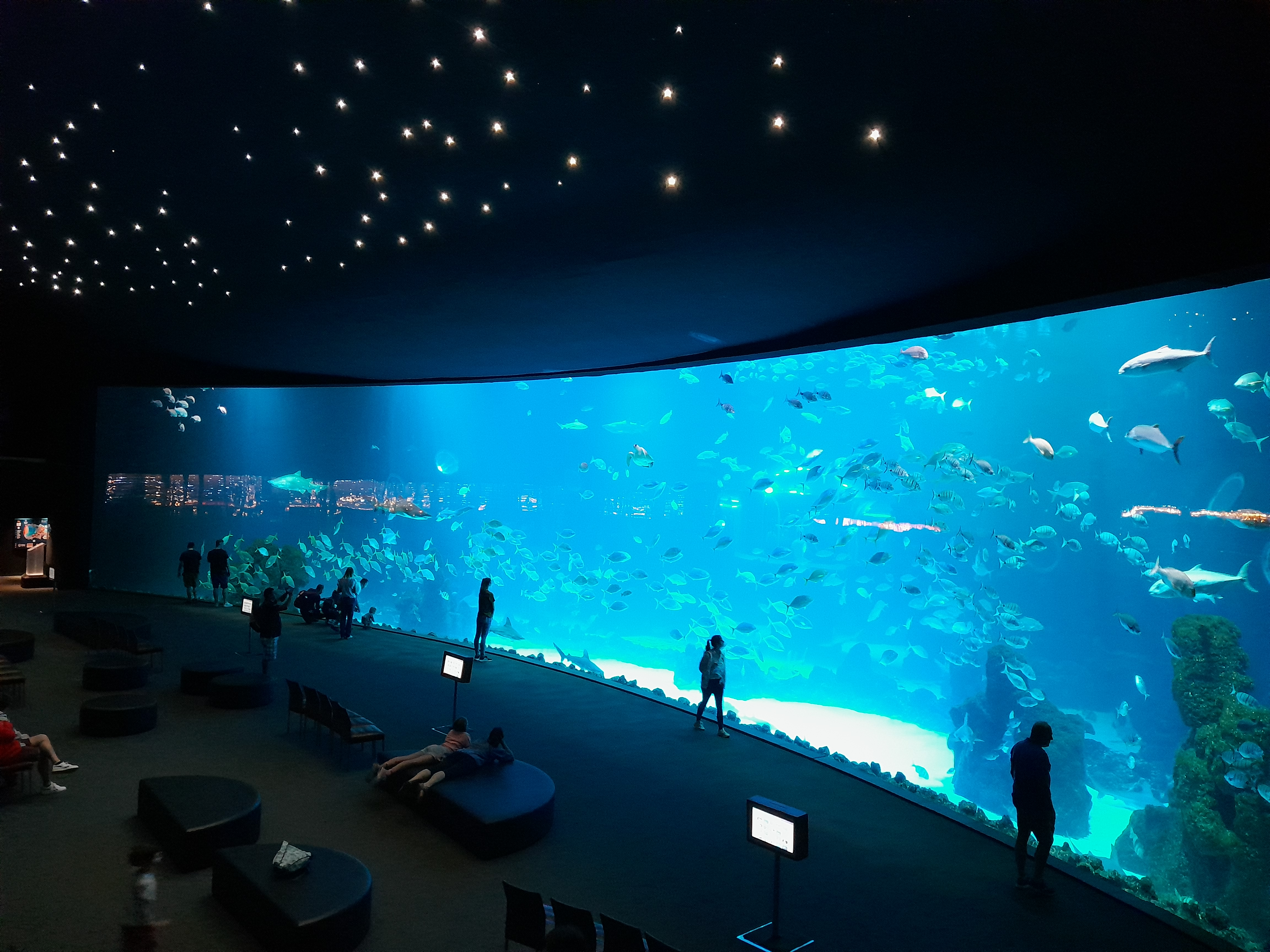
Deep sea exhibition window

- The first zone, The Jungle, reproduces landscapes in homage to the five continents.
- The second zone, Reef, is a walk around a huge cylinder that displays a wide variety of corals and fish.
- In the third zone, Deep Sea, the deepest ocean is reproduced, thanks to the largest curved exhibition window in the world: a 140-ton methacrylate, 36 meters long and seven meters high, making it the largest saltwater aquarium in Europe.

== Commitment to the marine environment ==
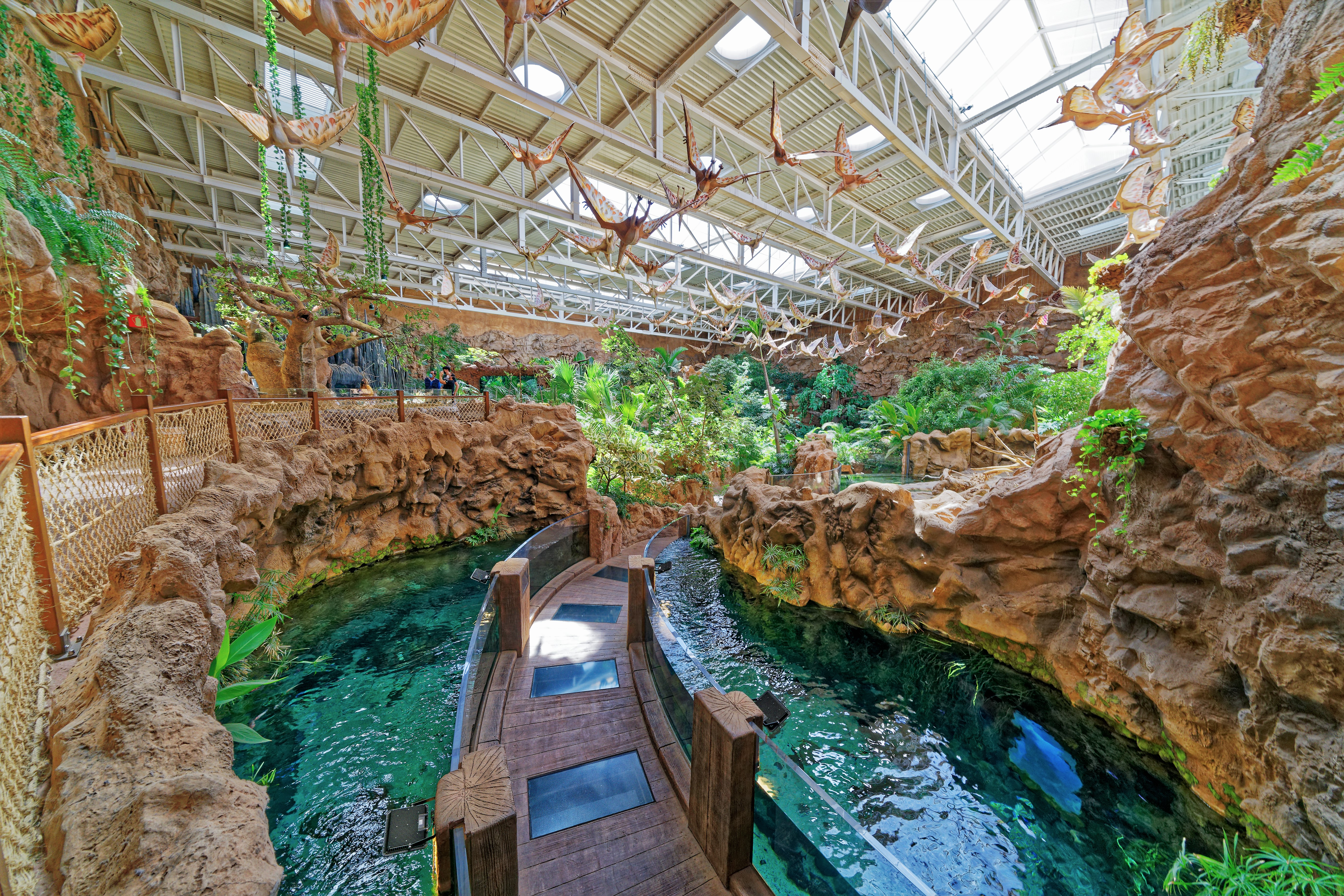
2017

It collaborates with the European Commission and the United Nations Environment Programme to launch a coalition of aquariums that fight against pollution caused by plastics.

It carries out awareness actions through educational workshops, conservation, and protection of vulnerable species, such as the recovery of injured turtles for their subsequent return to the sea.

== Criticism ==
During the 21-day period between political inauguration and full opening, the aquarium had no lighting of its own because it had not yet received the official opening permits, necessary to certify the habitability of the space. The only light ensuring the survival of the animals was the construction light from the street.

The day of its inauguration, there was a difficult transfer of one of the sharks. The operation was managed by company operators and involved lifting the shark with a crane inside a bag with fastenings, after having previously supplied it with oxygen. During the operation, one of the fastenings came loose after the animal thrashed about, at which point it was placed back in its tank. Videos of the incident later circulated on social media.
