= Aquarium Pula =

Aquarium in Pula, Croatia

Coordinates: 44°50′07″N 13°49′59″E

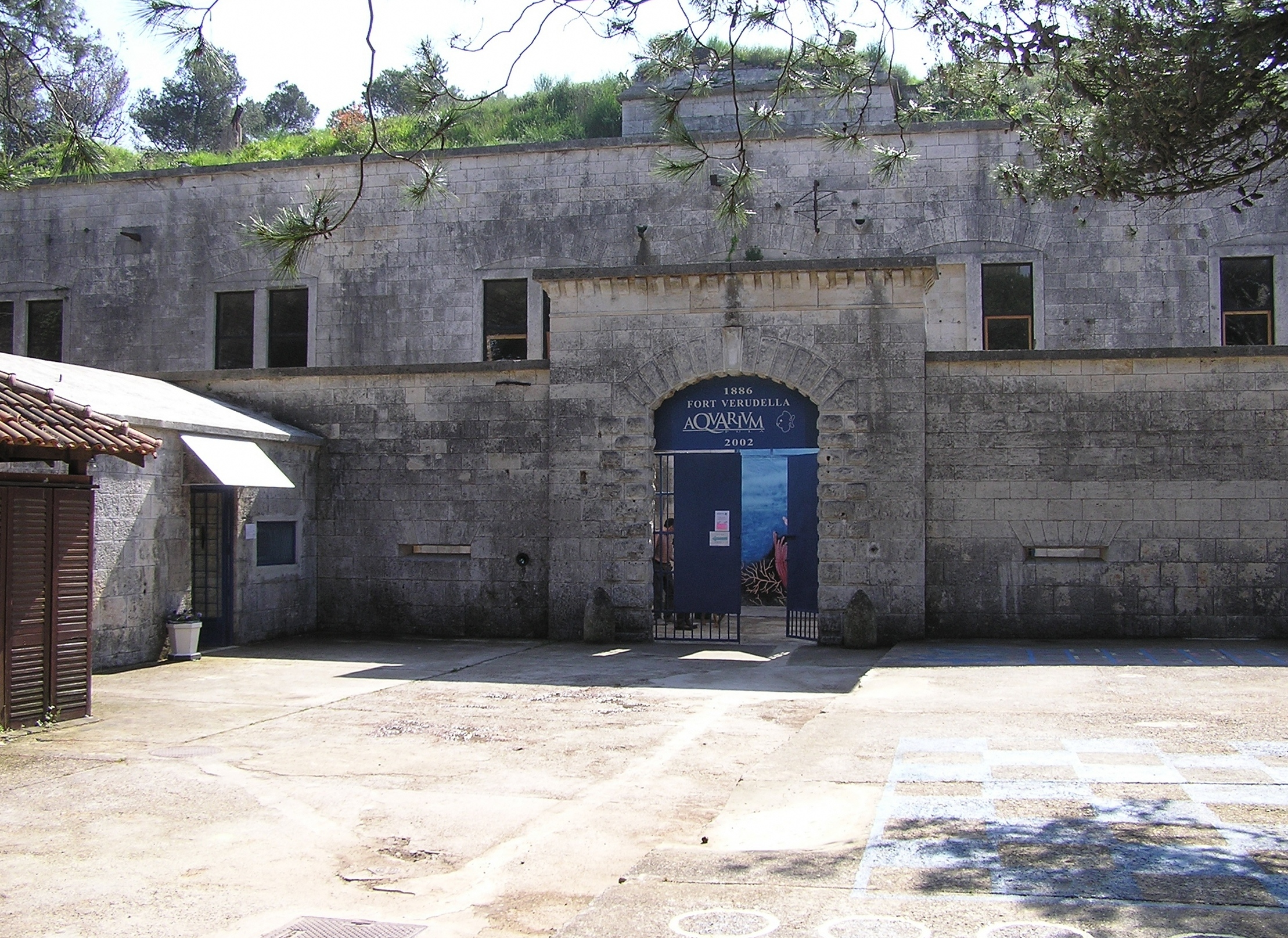
Fort Vedulla, the building of the Pula Aquarium

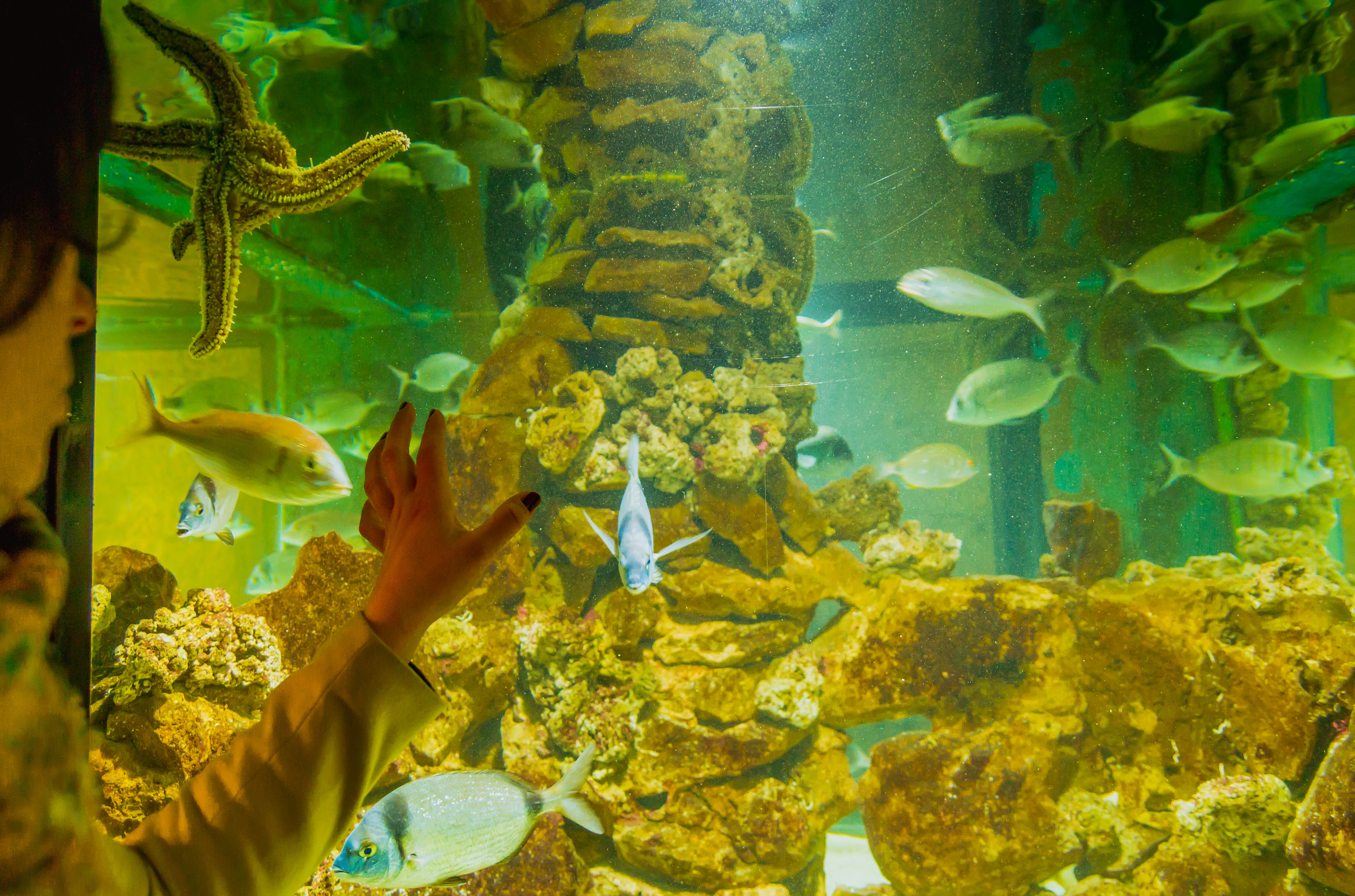
Fish tank in the aquarium

Aquarium Pula is an aquarium in Pula, Croatia. The aquarium has 211 species of animal, including blacktip reef sharks, caimans and a centre for the rehabilitation of turtles. As of the start of 2020, it had rehabilitated 160 loggerhead turtles and returned them to the sea.

== History ==
The aquarium is hosted inside a fort built by Austria-Hungary in 1886. In 1918, the fort was obtained by Italy; it was occupied by Germany in 1943 and then awarded to Yugoslavia two years later. From the 1950s, it was demilitarised and used as a hotel, then abandoned in the late 1980s until being made into the aquarium in 2002.

== Recognition ==
Milena Mičić, doctor of science since 1999, received the award for Entrepreneur of the Year for the conversion of the fortress into an aquarium. In 2020, the aquarium received 150,000 visitors, up from 125,000 in 2019 and 97,000 in 2016. In June 2022, the aquarium received the Friend of the Sea award.
