= Great Aquarium Saint-Malo =

Great Aquarium – Saint-Malo
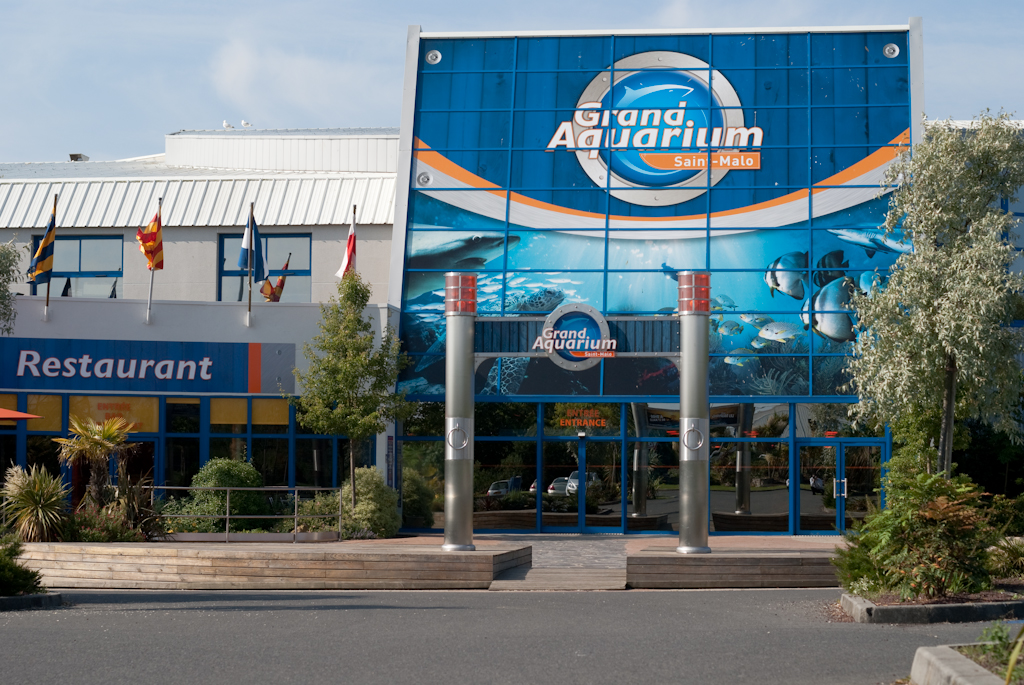
- Aquarium entrance
- Interactive map of Great Aquarium – Saint-Malo
- 48.6195°N 1.9945°W
- Location: Saint-Malo, France
- Floor space: 4,000 m^{2} (43,000 sq ft)
- No. of animals: ~11,000
- No. of species: ~600
- Volume of largest tank: 1,500,000 litres (400,000 US gal)
- Total volume of tanks: 2,500,000 litres (660,000 US gal)
- Annual visitors: 360,000
- Memberships: EAZA
- Owner: Looping Group
- Website: www.aquarium-st-malo.com

The Great Aquarium – Saint-Malo is an aquarium in Saint-Malo, France. It opened in 1996 and now belongs to the group Compagnie des Alpes, which also owns many other parks in France and Europe. The aquarium houses 11,000 marine animals representing 600 species. It covers 4,000 square metres (43,000 sq ft) and holds 2,500,000 litres (660,000 US gal) of water (The largest aquarium, Nautibus attraction excluded, contains 600,000 litres (160,000 US gal)). 360,000 people visit this site each year making it the second most visited tourist site in Brittany.

== History ==
- 1996 – Opening of the aquarium, the project was initiated by Maurice Chicheportiche.
- 1997 - Launch of the 3D movie.
- 1998 - Creation of the touch pool
- 1999 - Acquisition of the Great Aquarium by the Compagnie des Alpes group. Frédéric Charlot is the new director.
- 2000 - The visit is fully redesigned
- 2001 - Creation of the "Nautibus"
- 2002 - Nautibus receives the Themed Entertainment Association Award for its design and the Tourism Trophy of the Ille-et-Vilaine department
- 2003 - Several partners, including the Great Aquarium create the eco-association "Caution! Sea in danger"
- 2004 - Creation of "In Blue" a Sensory attraction
- 2006 - The Great Aquarium celebrates his 10th birthday
- 2007 - New logo and colours

== The visit and the attractions ==
During the visit, you can discover the underwater world in different rooms:

- Cold and temperate seas
- Tropical collection
- Mangrove
- The wreck of the ship where sharks dominate.

Three attractions complete the visit:

- The touch pool that allows you to touch some marine species of the Brittany coast such as rays, bats, sea stars and spiders
- A sharks ring. 7 sharks (4 different species) and 4 sea turtles swim in a basin which contains 600,000 litres (160,000 US gal) of water and completely encircles the room. You can also spend one night in the heart of this ring, surrounded by sharks.
- The Nautibus, a journey in a small submarine, presents 5,000 fishes swimming in a pool of 1,500,000 litres (400,000 US gal) of water.

== Caution! Sea in danger ==
The association was created in 2003 at the initiative of the aquarium with some partners such as the city of Saint-Malo. Caution! Sea in Danger aims to sensitize and educate people about dangers that threaten the sea and the shorelines. Its scope extends throughout the Emerald Coast, and they initiate various operations such as cleaning of natural sites, lessons for children during classrooms or participation at the "Ocean world day" established in 1992 by the United Nations.
