= Baconao =

Baconao Biosphere Reserve
- IUCN category VI (protected area with sustainable use of natural resources)
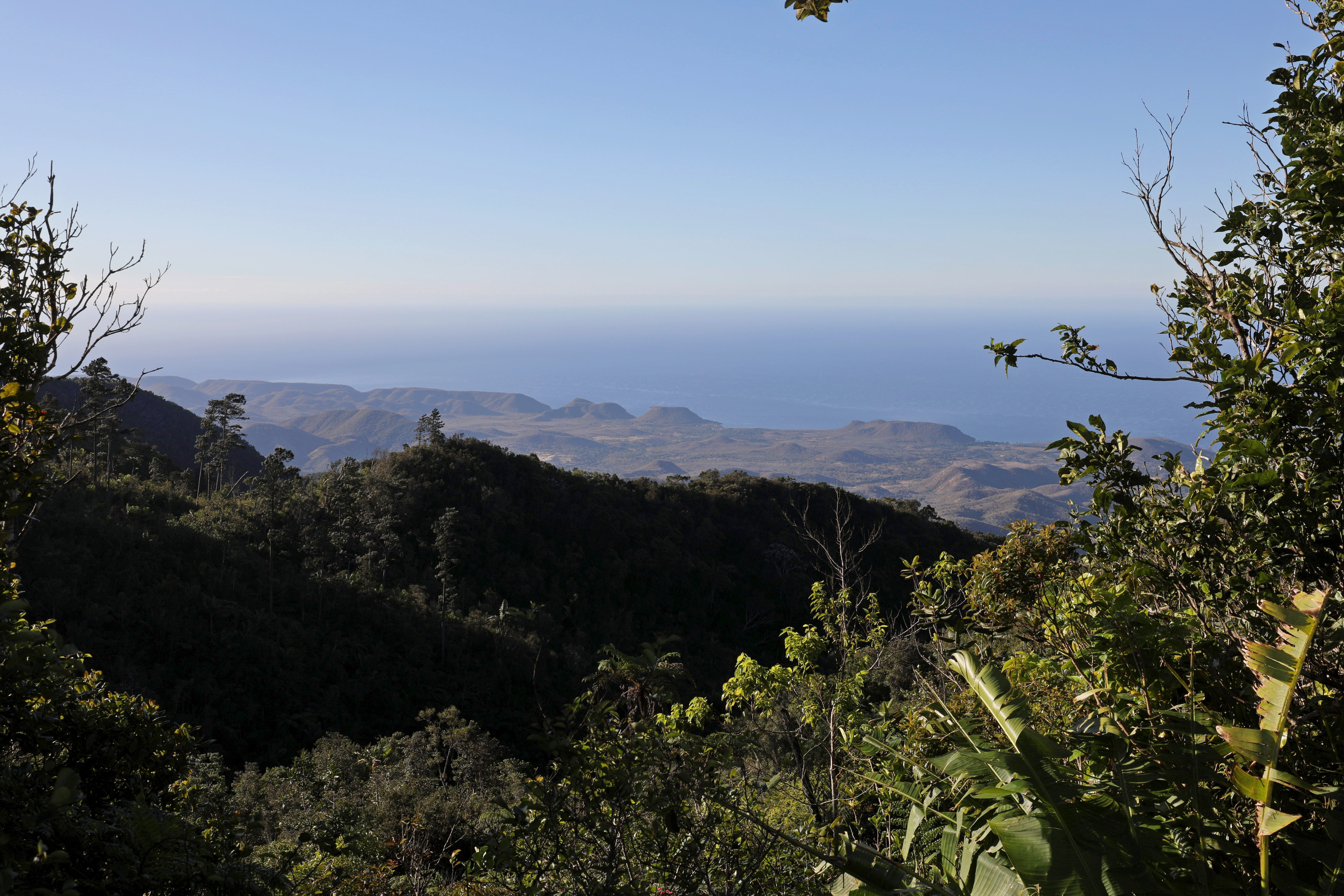

- Location within Cuba
- Location: Cuba
- Nearest city: Santiago de Cuba
- Coordinates: 19°54′7″N 75°27′46″W
- Area: 848.57 km^{2} (327.63 sq mi)
- Established: 1987
- Governing body: El Ministerio de Ciencia, Tecnología y Medio Ambiente (CITMA)

Baconao Park is a large park region, about 60 kilometers away from the city of Santiago de Cuba, with a total surface of 848.57 km^{2} (327.63 sq mi).

== History ==
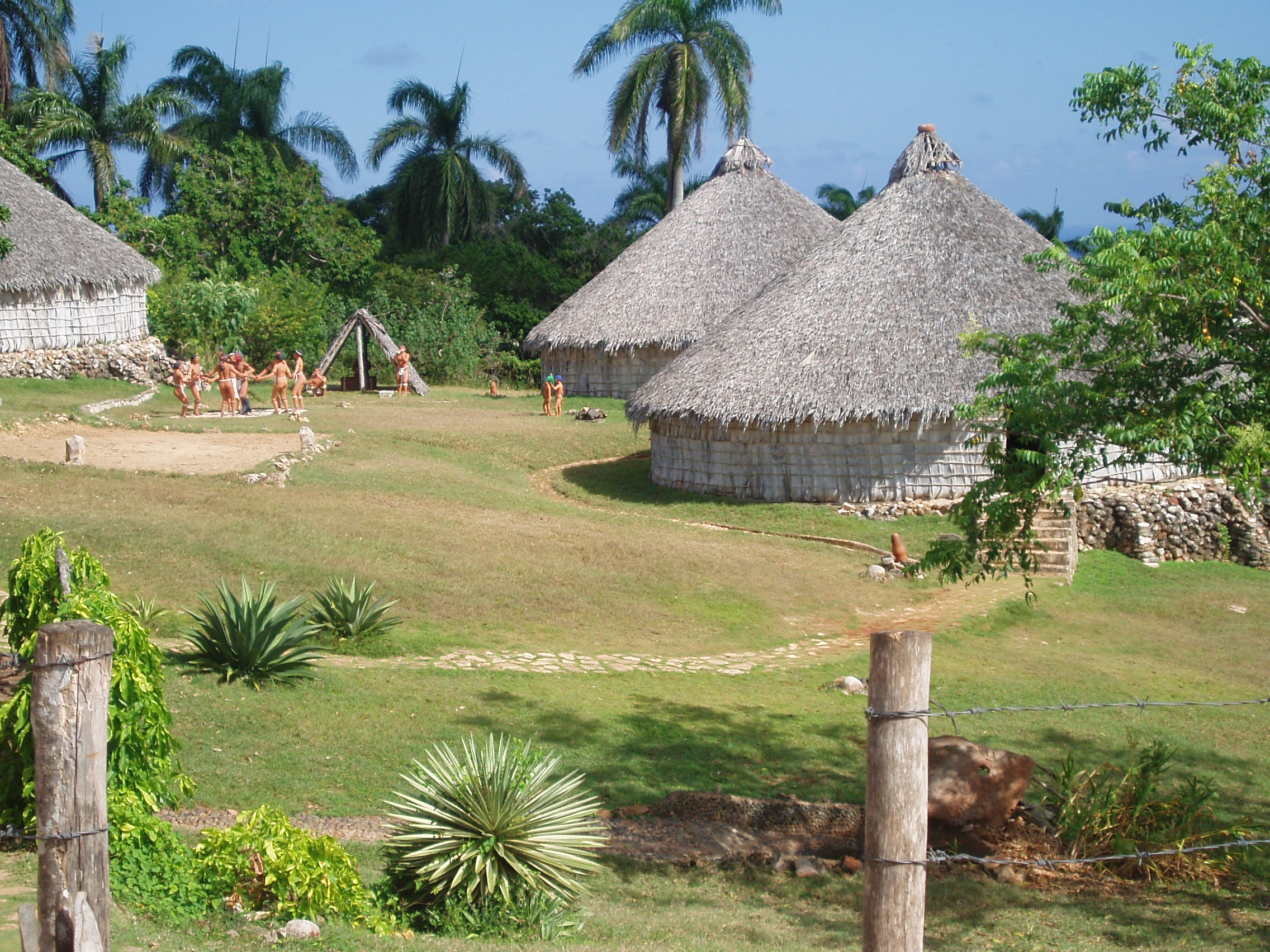
Reconstruction of Taino village

The name Baconao is related to the name of a little native who lived in the south of Cuba during the pre-Columbian period. Legend mentions a magical tree, called bacona, that allowed the child to play music from the lagoon's snails.

This little Cuban was known for his fishing and swimming skills, as well as playing Batos (Cuban original baseball game).

The child used to sit under the bacona tree to play music from his snail. Everybody in the village was fascinated, and thought that the ability to play the music was a gift from the magical tree. Therefore, they began to call the child Baconao.

One day, the young boy left the village for a trip, and never came back. The villagers believed that the child's magic returned to the trees, and as time passed, the whole area got the name Baconao.

In 1987, it was declared a World Heritage Biosphere Reserve by the UNESCO.

== Attractions ==
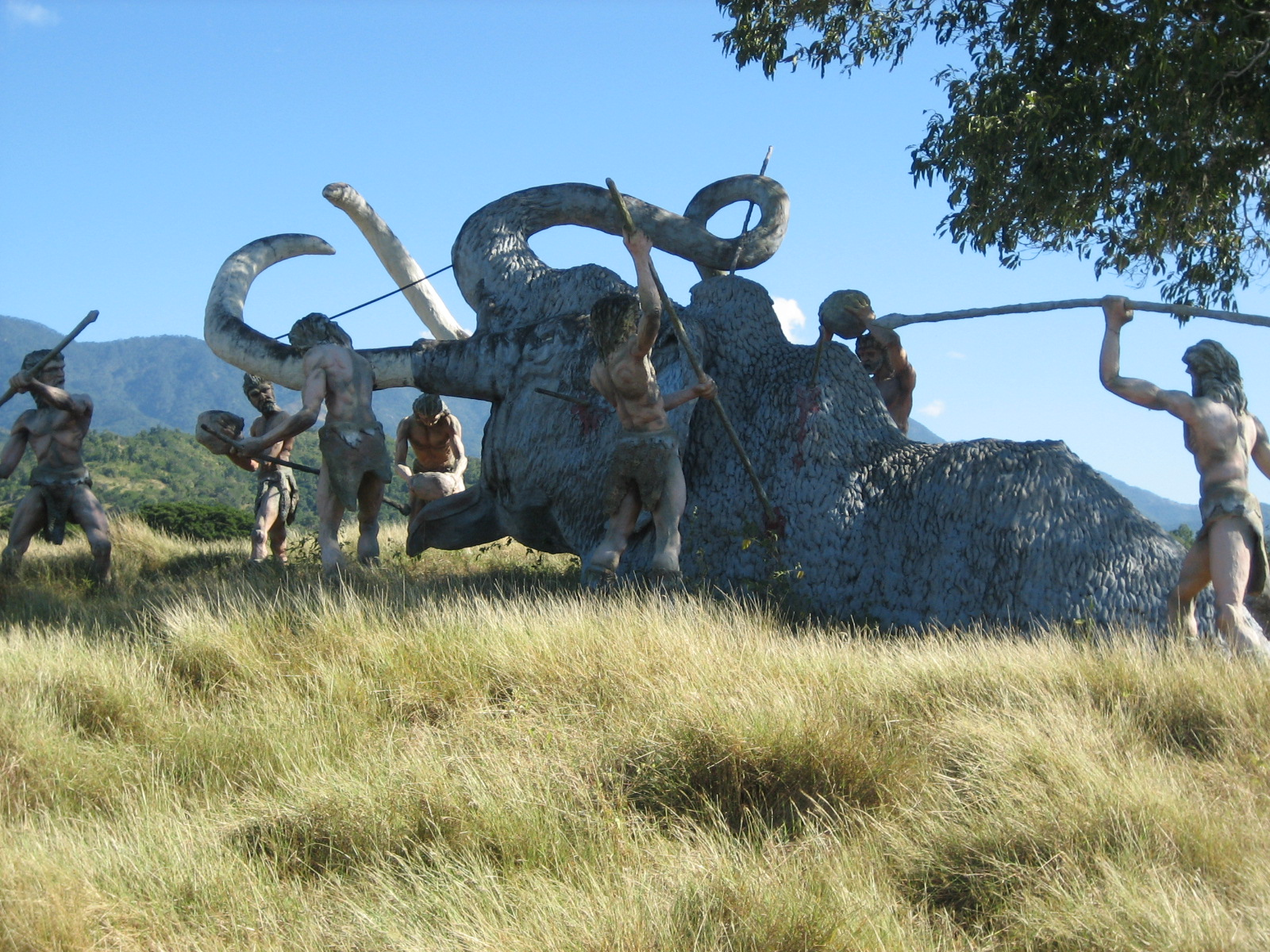
Prehistoric Valley exhibit

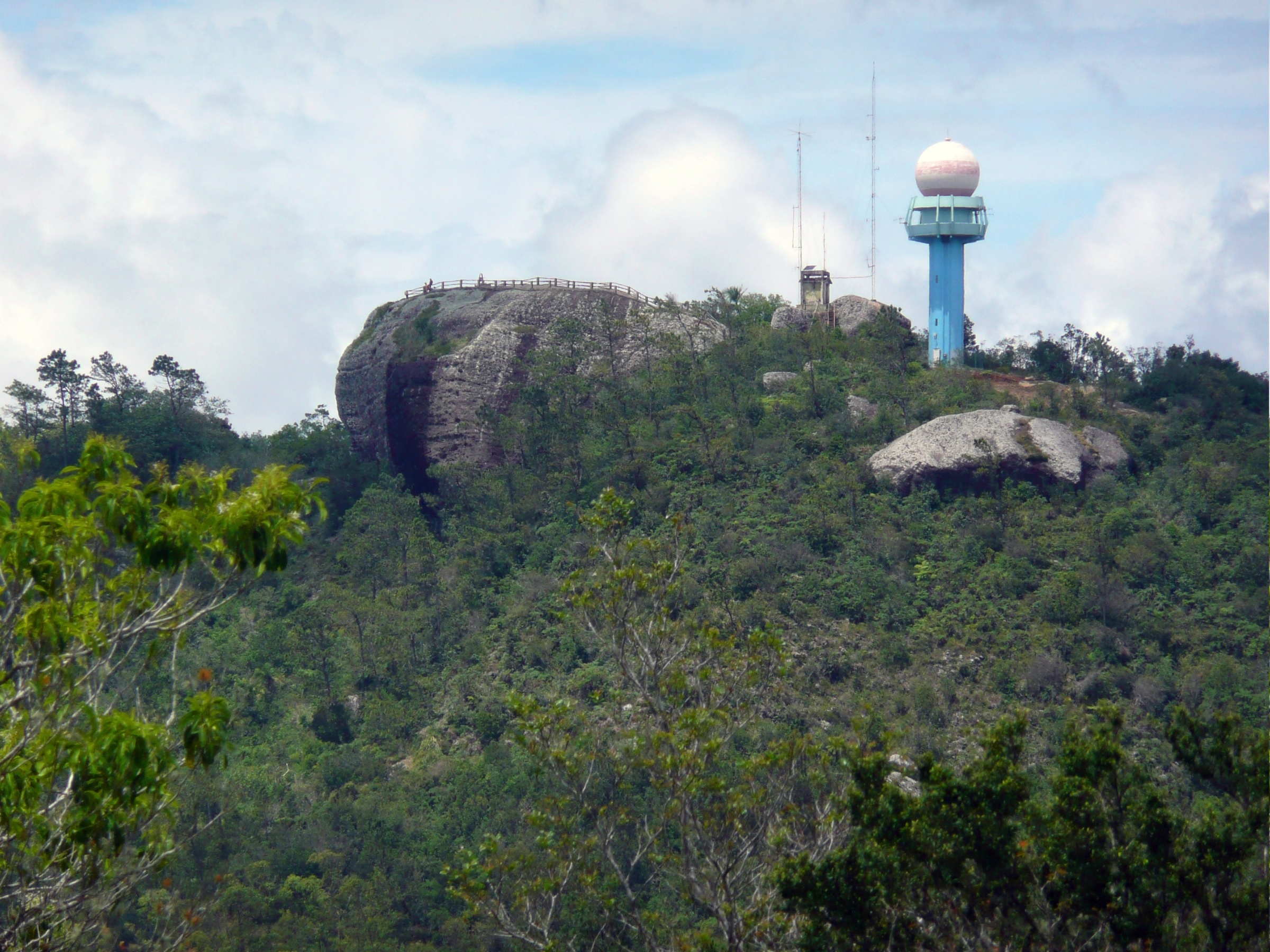
View of Great Rock / Gran Piedra

The park contains a variety of attractions beside wildlife refuges and coffee plantations.

Great Rock (Gran Piedra)

The Great Rock is a large rock of volcanic origin, measuring 51 m (167 ft) long, 25 m (82 ft) high, and 30 m (98 ft) wide. Its estimated weight is more than 63 thousand tons.

It is possible to climb 459 stone steps to the summit of the rock, and stand 1,234 meters above sea level for a panoramic view. It is said that on a dark night one can see the lights of Jamaica.

Prehistoric Valley

In the Valle de la Prehistoria visitors encounter dozens of life-size model dinosaurs sculpted in stone and other prehistoric creatures lurking in lush vegetation.

Farm (Granjita Siboney)

The farm is the place where the attackers of the Moncada Barracks (Cuartel Moncada) led by Fidel Castro, spent the night prior to the attack on 26 July 1953.

Botanical Garden

There is also a 0.45 km^{2} (0.17 sq mi) garden, called Jardin Ave de Paraiso, dating from 1860, that was laid out on a former coffee plantation and features a series of colour-coded gardens with unique scents and displays in each.

Museum of History of Terrestrial Transport

The museum displays over 2,500 small-scale car replicas.

Aquarium

The aquarium is 30 m (98 ft) deep, and has a submarine tunnel, and a Dolphinarium.

Baconao Lagoon

The lagoon has an area of 4 km^{2} (1.5 sq mi). There is also a reproduction of a Taíno Village, and a restaurant specialized in seafood.
