= Parque Alcalde =

Park in Guadalajara, Jalisco, Mexico

- Location within Mexico
- Location: Guadalajara, Jalisco, Mexico
- Coordinates: 20°41′27″N 103°21′2″W

Parque Alcalde is a park in Guadalajara, in the Mexican state of Jalisco.
