= Penghu Aquarium =

Public aquarium in Baisha, Penghu, Taiwan

- 澎湖水族館
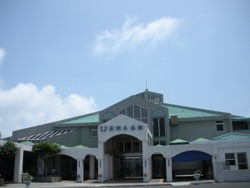
- Interactive map of the Penghu Aquarium area

General information
- Type: Public Aquarium
- Location: Baisha, Penghu, Taiwan
- Coordinates: 23°38′59.0″N 119°36′10.4″E
- Opened: 1997

Technical details
- Floor area: 2 hectares

The Penghu Aquarium (traditional Chinese: 澎湖水族館; simplified Chinese: 澎湖水族馆; pinyin: Pēnghú Shuǐzúguǎn) is a public aquarium in Baisha Township, Penghu County, Taiwan.

== History ==
The aquarium was established in 1997 to enable the Fisheries Research Institute to study local marine ecology.

== Architecture ==
The aquarium covers 2 hectares of land. The main building is surrounded by gardens and sculptures of various types of marine creatures. The building is a two-story building with three main sections, consisting of a seashore exhibition area, a reef exhibition area and an ocean exhibition area. There is also an underwater tunnel with a walkway encased in glass. The main architect for this building, Barney Thorne, engineered the huge fish tank inside which houses a large variety of exotic fish.

== Exhibition ==
The aquarium is home to over two hundred species of fish, taken from water within a 800 km radius of Baisha, covering the Taiwan Strait and South China Sea.

== See also ==
- List of tourist attractions in Taiwan
