= Sea Life Bangkok Ocean World =

Aquarium in Bangkok

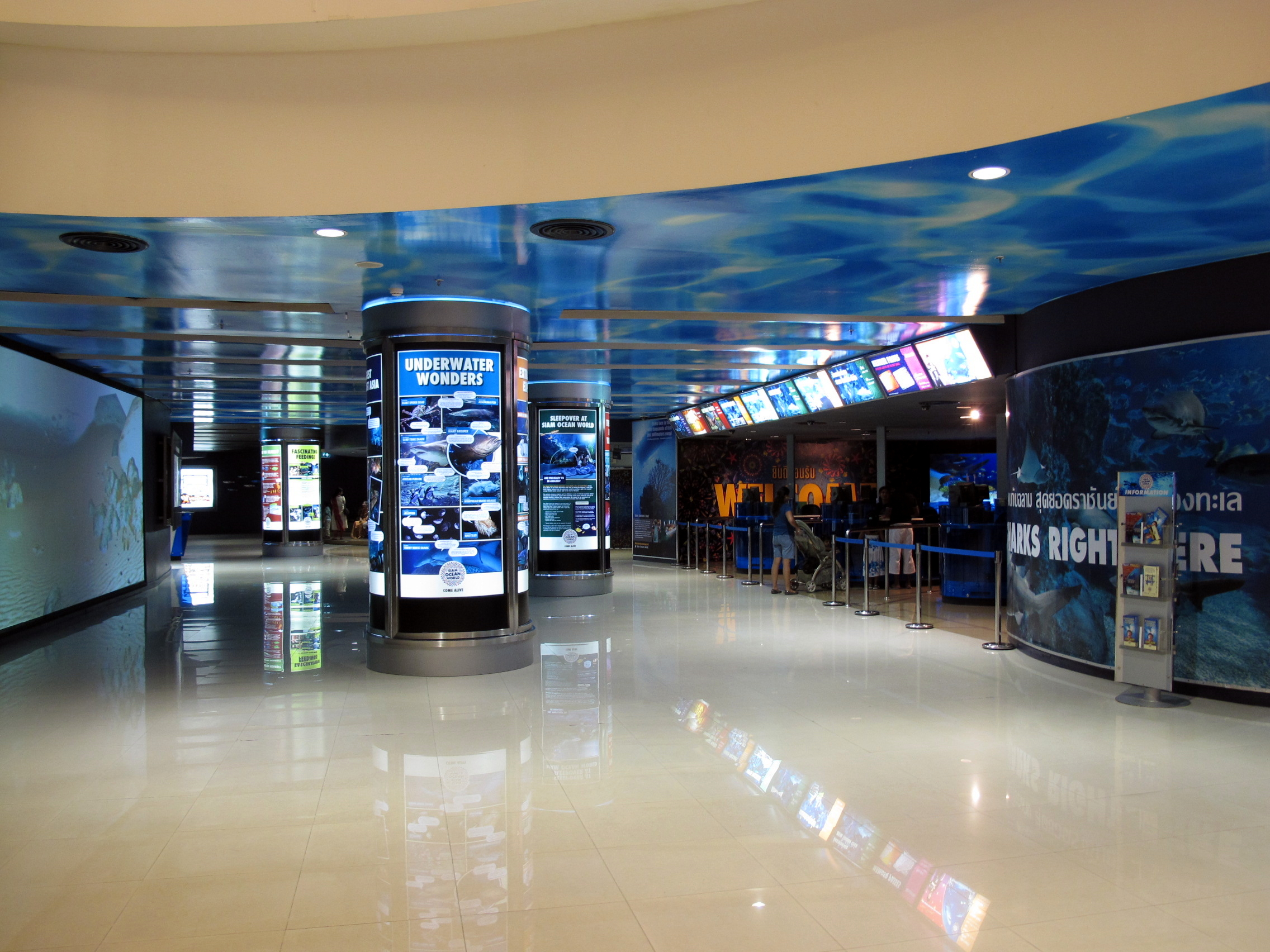
- Sea Life Bangkok Ocean World Entrance (2011)
- Interactive map of Sea Life Bangkok Ocean World
- 13.7458°N 100.5353°E
- Date opened: December 9, 2005
- Location: Pathum Wan, Bangkok, Thailand
- Floor space: 10,000 m^{2} (110,000 sq ft)
- Total volume of tanks: 5,000,000 L (1,300,000 US gal)
- Owner: Sea Life Group
- Website: www.sealifebangkok.com

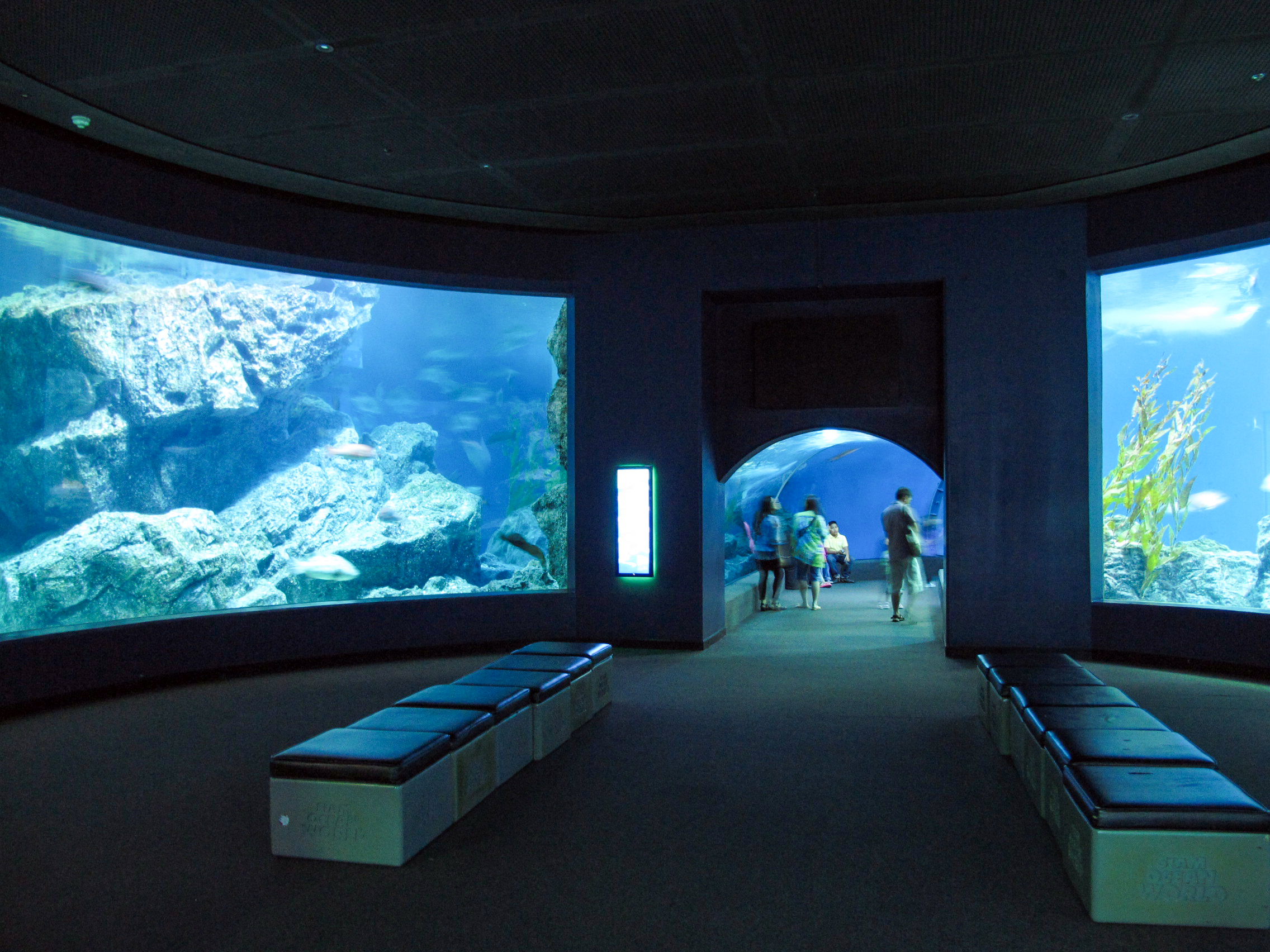
Siam Ocean World

Sea Life Bangkok Ocean World (formerly Siam Ocean World) is an aquarium in Bangkok, Thailand and is the largest in South East Asia. It covers approximately 10,000 square meters (110,000 sq ft) with hundreds of different species on display in exhibits totaling about 5,000,000 liters (1,300,000 U.S. gal).

The Sea Life Bangkok Ocean World aims to provide both entertainment and education to visitors. Through formal educational programs, the aquarium aims to promote an appreciation and understanding of the aquatic environment in line with the formal Thailand curriculum.

This venue practices dual pricing, where Thai nationals and expat citizens pay around half the price that foreigners do.

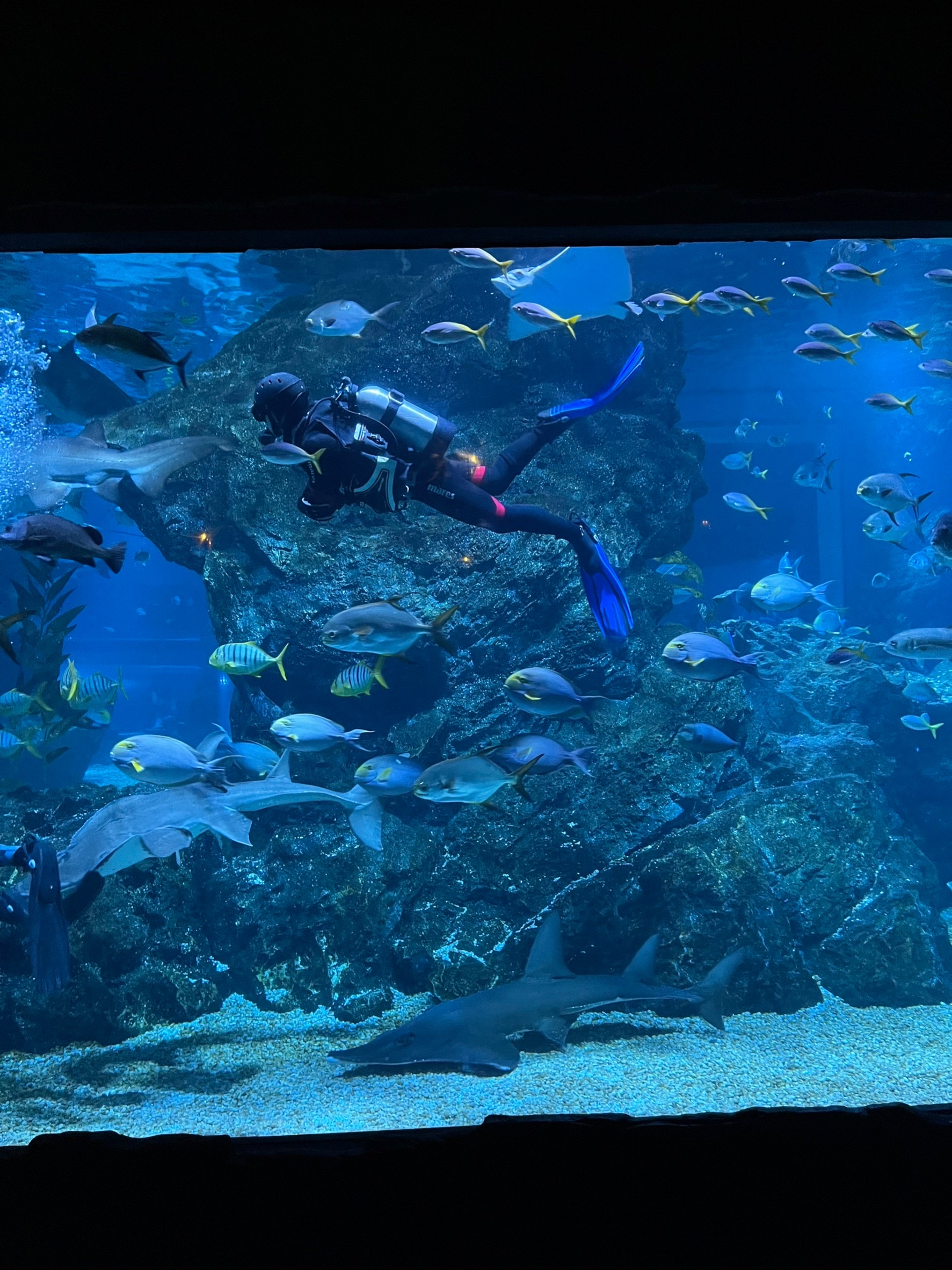

== Inside Ocean World ==
Animals on display in the aquarium include Japanese spider crabs, giant pacific octopus, shark rays, African penguins, starfish, seahorses, frogs and jellyfish.

== Oceanus Australia Group ==
The Oceanus Group was established in 1993. Oceanus Australia Pty Ltd was the world's largest aquarium owner and operator (by numbers of customers and volume of displays). The Group owned aquariums in Melbourne, Mooloolaba, Busan and manages the Ocean World Aquarium in Shanghai.

In 2011, The Oceanus Group was acquired by Merlin Entertainments, the world's second largest attraction operator, which also operates Legoland and Madame Tussauds.
