= Water planet =

Water planet, Planet Water, planet of Water, planets named "Water", may refer to:

== Planetology ==
- Issues concerning planetary habitability
- Ocean world, planetary body containing a significant amount of water
  - Hycean planet, an astronomical body covered in water with a hydrogen atmosphere
- Hydrosphere, planetary water, a planet's water

== Places ==
- Earth, sometimes nicknamed "the Water Planet"

=== Fictional locations ===
- Water (Lexx), a fictional planet in the television series Lexx
- Planet Water (Shadow Raiders), a fictional planet in the animated television series Shadow Raiders
- Water Planet, a fictional planet from the TV show Lost in Space (2018 TV series) which won a 2020 award for special effects in a TV episode
- Water Planet, a fictional planet from the 2010s webcomic Axe Cop
- Water Planet, a fictional location from the 2001 videogame Serious Sam: The First Encounter

== Film ==
- Water Planet, a documentary short film produced by Leonardo DiCaprio
- The Water Planet, former title of the 1984 comedic sci-fi film The Ice Pirates
- Water Planet, a 2016 animated film from Shanghai Hippo Animation

== Literature ==
- Water Planet, 1991 book of poetry by Ralph Fletcher
- The Water Planet: A Celebration of the Wonder of Water, 1988 book by Lyall Watson
- "Navigation 01: The Water Planet" (Japanese: 水の惑星, romanized: Mizu no Wakusei), a chapter from the first volume of the serial manga comic Aqua; see List of Aria chapters
- Planet Water (collection) (Russian: Планета Вода), a 2015 short story anthology about fictional detective Erast Fandorin by Boris Akunin
  - "Planet Water" (short story) (Russian: Планета Вода), a 2015 short story about fictional detective Erast Fandorin by Boris Akunin
- The Planet Water (Ukrainian: Планета Вода; Russian: Планета Вода), a 1983 novel by Valentina Yermolova (1940-2023)

== Television ==
- Water Planet, 2012 Polish TV show
- "The Water Planet", 1970 episode 13 of the documentary TV show The Undersea World of Jacques Cousteau
- "The Water Planet", 1972 episode 5 of animated TV show Josie and the Pussycats in Outer Space; see Josie and the Pussycats (TV series)

== Other uses ==
- Planet Water Foundation; see List of water-related charities
- "The Planet of Water", Hydropolis, Wrocław, Silesia, Poland; a science exhibit in the Hydropolis science museum

== See also ==
- Mercury (planet), called "water star" (水星) in Chinese, Korean, Japanese and Vietnamese
- "Planeta Água" (Portuguese: Water Planet), 1981 song by Guilherme Arantes
- Marine World (disambiguation)
- Sea World (disambiguation)
- Ocean World (disambiguation)
- Water World (disambiguation)
- Waterland (disambiguation)
- Water (disambiguation)
