= Water World =

Water World, Water world, or Waterworld may refer to:

== Film and television ==
- Waterworld, 1995 science fiction film
  - WaterWorld, stunt show featured at many Universal Studios parks around the world based on the 1995 film
- Water World, ITV documentary series presented by Timothy West, about 'the people who live and work on the canals of the Midlands'

== Games ==
- Waterworld (video game), video games based on the film Waterworld
  - Waterworld (Virtual Boy video game), the game adaptation for the Virtual Boy
- Waterworld (pinball), a pinball machine based on the film Waterworld
- Waterworld, third game in the Swordquest series of games by Atari for the Atari 2600

== Music ==
- Waterworld (Binary Star album), first album from Michigan hip hop duo Binary Star
- Waterworld (Leak Bros. album), 2003 album from underground rappers Cage and Tame One
- "Water World", a song by Kidsongs

== Parks ==
- Water World, Colorado, recreational water park in Federal Heights, Colorado
- Water World, the water park section of Waldameer in Erie, Pennsylvania
- Waterworld, Hamilton, water park in Hamilton, New Zealand
- Waterworld California, water park in Concord, California
- Waterworld, Stoke-on-Trent, indoor water park in Festival Park
- WaterWorld Safari, former water park in Phoenix, Arizona, now Six Flags Hurricane Harbor Phoenix
- Water World, Lloret de Mar, water park in Lloret de Mar, Spain
- WaterWorld Themed Waterpark (Ayia Napa), Cyprus

== Science ==
- Ocean world, a hypothetical type of planet completely covered in water
  - Hycean planet, an astronomical body covered in water with a hydrogen atmosphere
- Hydrosphere, a world's water

== Other ==
- Waterworld, Wrexham, building in Wrexham, Wales, UK

== See also ==
- Water park
- Ocean World (disambiguation)
- Water planet (disambiguation)
- Waterland (disambiguation)
- Marine World (disambiguation)
- Sea World (disambiguation)
