= Ocean World =

Ocean World can mean several things:

- Ocean world, an astronomical body possessing a significant amount of water
  - Hycean planet, an astronomical body covered in water with a hydrogen atmosphere
- Oceanworld Manly, a theme park
- "Ocean World" is an episode of The Blue Planet
- Ocean World (water park), a water park in South Korea
- Ocean World, an aquarium in Crescent City, California
- Ocean Worlds Exploration Program at NASA

== See also ==
- Ocean (disambiguation)
- Ocean Park (disambiguation)
- Marine World (disambiguation)
- Sea World (disambiguation)
- Water planet (disambiguation)
- Water World (disambiguation)
- Aqua Planet (disambiguation)
- World Ocean
