= List of largest aquariums =

Large aquariums exhibit a wide variety of species and animals in a large range of tanks. These are typically public aquariums and may also include oceanariums and dolphinariums, designed to showcase a diverse range of marine animals for the public.

== In operation ==
Only aquariums with a total capacity of more than 10 million litres and/or a tank larger than 5 million litres are included in the list. The list is not necessarily complete; aquariums that may meet the criteria but do not have published sources on their capacity may not be reflected in the list.

Image	Aquarium	City	Country	Total capacity	Largest tank	Notes
	Chimelong Spaceship	Hengqin	China	75,350,969 L (16,574,889.18 U.S. gal)	56,450,136 L (12,417,288.86 U.S. gal)	Holder of the Guinness World Record since 2023 for largest aquarium and largest aquarium tank.
	Chimelong Ocean Kingdom	Hengqin	China	48,750,000 L (12,880,000 U.S. gal)	22,700,000 L (5,997,000 U.S. gal)	Holder of the Guinness World Record since 2014 for largest underwater viewing dome. Held the record for largest aquarium between 2014 and 2023.
	S.E.A. Aquarium	Singapore	Singapore	45,200,000 L (11,940,000 U.S. gal)	18,170,000 L (4,800,000 U.S. gal)	Held the Guinness World Record for largest aquarium from 2012 until 2014.
	L'Oceanogràfic	Valencia	Spain	41,600,000 L (10,990,000 U.S. gal)	7,000,000 L (1,849,000 U.S. gal)	
	Georgia Aquarium	Atlanta	United States	41,640,000 L (11,000,000 U.S. gal)	23,850,000 L (6,300,000 U.S. gal)	Held the Guinness World Record for largest aquarium from 2005 until 2012.
	Port of Nagoya Public Aquarium	Nagoya	Japan	27,000,000 L (7,133,000 U.S. gal)	13,400,000 L (3,540,000 U.S. gal)	
	National Museum of Marine Biology and Aquarium	Hengchun	Taiwan	24,142,000 L (6,378,000 U.S. gal)	4,070,000 L (1,075,000 U.S. gal)	
	Moscow Oceanarium	Moscow	Russia	25,000,000 L (6,604,000 U.S. gal)	1,490,000 L (393,600 U.S. gal)	Consist of aquarium exhibitions with total capacity 3,000,000 L, large pool for performances, dolphins and orca enclosures and swimming pools.
	The Seas with Nemo & Friends	Bay Lake, Florida	United States	21,580,000 L (5,700,000 U.S. gal)		The Seas is located in Epcot at Walt Disney World.
	Aqua Planet Jeju	Jeju Island	South Korea	20,000,000 L (5,283,000 U.S. gal)	10,800,000 L (2,853,000 U.S. gal)	
	Atlanterhavsparken	Ålesund	Norway	19,000,000 L (5,019,000 U.S. gal)	4,000,000 L (1,056,000 U.S. gal)	Total volume calculated using combined volume of Atlantic Tank and Seal Bay.
	Shedd Aquarium	Chicago	United States	18,900,000 L (4,993,000 U.S. gal)	7,600,000 L (2,008,000 U.S. gal)	
	Nausicaä Centre National de la Mer	Boulogne-sur-Mer	France	17,000,000 L (4,491,000 U.S. gal)	10,000,000 L (2,642,000 U.S. gal)	
	Cube Oceanarium	Chengdu	China	11,000,000 L (2,906,000 U.S. gal)	10,000,000 L (2,642,000 U.S. gal)	
	Dubai Aquarium and Underwater Zoo	Dubai	United Arab Emirates	10,500,000 L (2,774,000 U.S. gal)	10,000,000 L (2,642,000 U.S. gal)	
	Osaka Aquarium Kaiyukan	Osaka	Japan	10,000,000 L (2,642,000 U.S. gal)	7,500,000 L (1,981,000 U.S. gal)	
	Okinawa Churaumi Aquarium	Okinawa	Japan	9,800,000 L (2,589,000 U.S. gal)	7,500,000 L (1,981,000 U.S. gal)	
	Antalya Aquarium	Antalya	Turkey	7,500,000 L (1,981,000 U.S. gal)	5,000,000 L (1,321,000 U.S. gal)	
	Lisbon Oceanarium	Lisbon	Portugal	7,000,000 L (1,849,000 U.S. gal)	5,000,000 L (1,321,000 U.S. gal)	
	TurkuaZoo	Istanbul	Turkey	7,000,000 L (1,849,000 U.S. gal)	5,000,000 L (1,321,000 U.S. gal)	
	Istanbul Aquarium	Istanbul	Turkey	7,000,000 L (1,849,000 U.S. gal)	?	

== See also ==
- List of aquaria
- List of former zoos and aquariums
- List of dolphinariums
- List of zoos by country
