= Aqua Planet =

Aqua Planet may refer to:

- Ocean world, a type of planet that contains a substantial amount of water in the form of oceans
- Aqua Planet (water park), a water park at the Clark Freeport Zone in Pampanga, Philippines
- Aqua Planet (aquarium), a chain of public aquariums in South Korea

== See also ==
- Ocean World (disambiguation)
