= Federal Heights =

Federal Heights may refer to the following places in the United States:

- Federal Heights, Colorado
- Federal Heights, Salt Lake City, Utah
