= Sea World =

Sea World, Seaworld, SeaWorld may mean:

- Sea World (Australia), a marine theme park in Main Beach, Gold Coast, Australia
  - Sea World Helicopters, a company associated with the theme park that operated the helicopters involved in the 2023 Gold Coast mid-air collision
- Sea World (Shenzhen), a tourist attraction in Shenzhen, China
- Sea World Ancol, a marine aquarium tourist attraction in North Jakarta, Indonesia
- SeaWorld, a U.S. chain of marine theme parks
  - SeaWorld Abu Dhabi
  - SeaWorld Ohio
  - SeaWorld Orlando
  - SeaWorld San Antonio
  - SeaWorld San Diego
- 63 Seaworld, a Korean aquarium
- Deep Sea World, a Scottish aquarium
- Kamogawa Sea World, a marine theme park in Japan
- "The Sea World", a 2012 episode of Best of Luck Nikki (an Indian adaptation of Good Luck Charlie)

== See also ==
- Sea Life, another chain of marine-themed attractions
- Marine World (disambiguation)
- Marineland (disambiguation)
- Water planet (disambiguation)
- Water World (disambiguation)
