= Dubai Aquarium and Underwater Zoo =

Biggest aquarium in the United Arab Emirates

- دبي أكواريوم وحديقة الحيوانات المائية (Arabic)
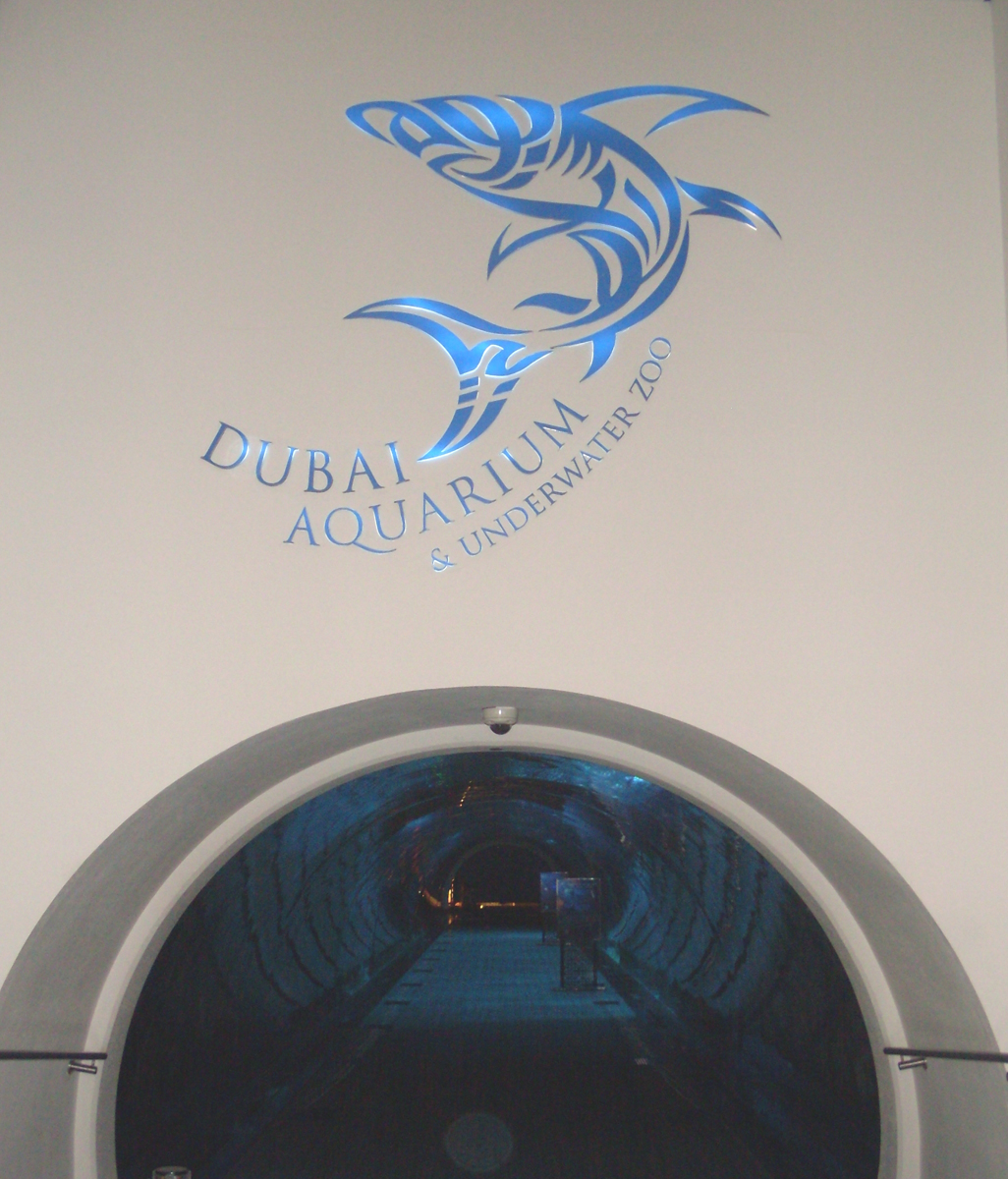

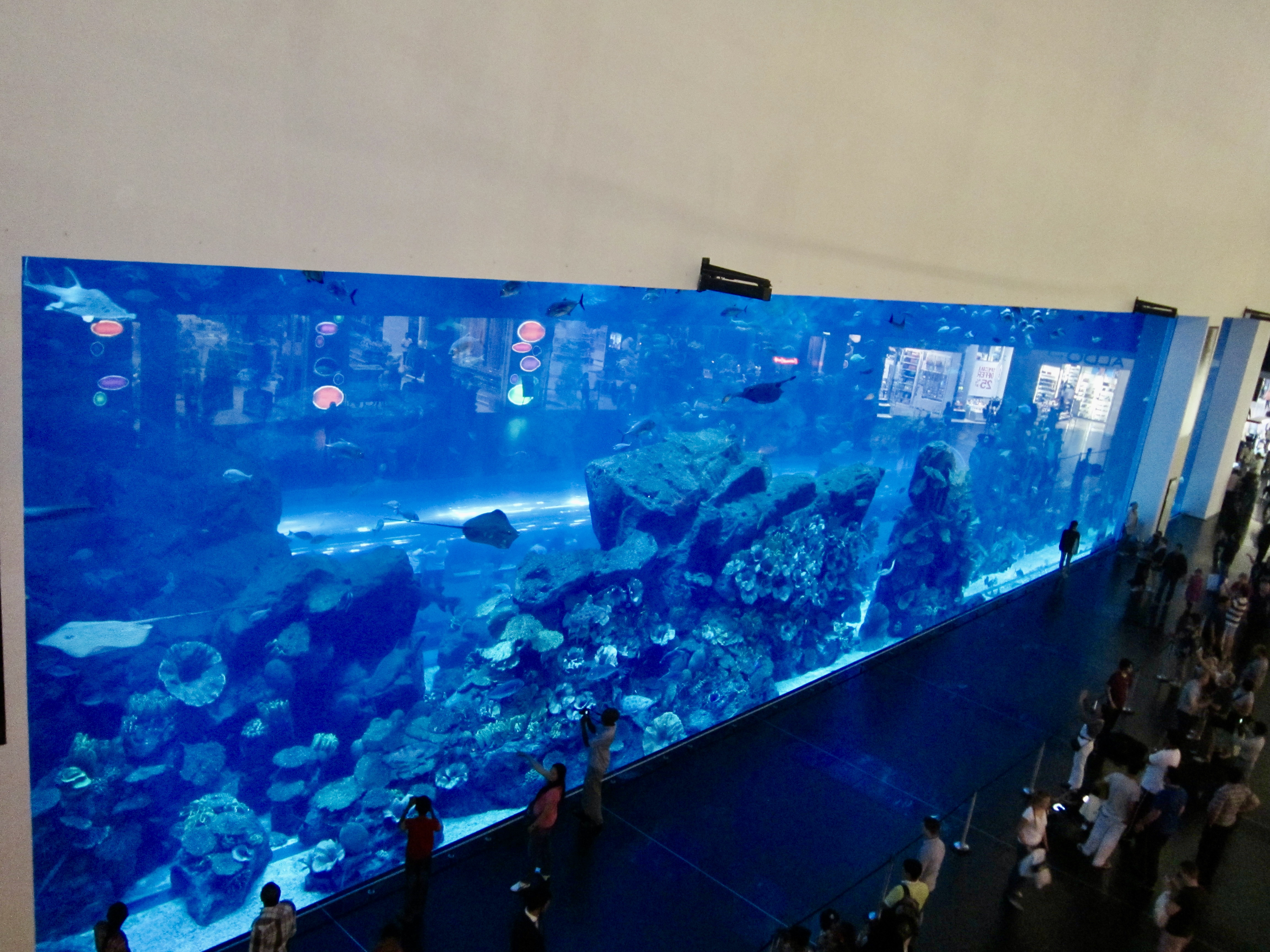
- Interactive map of Dubai Aquarium and Underwater Zoo
- 25°11′51.2″N 55°16′42.3″E
- Date opened: November 4, 2008
- Location: Dubai Mall, Dubai, United Arab Emirates
- Land area: 160 hectares (400 acres)
- No. of animals: 33,000
- No. of species: 300
- Volume of largest tank: 10,000,000 L (2,642,000 U.S. gal)
- Total volume of tanks: 10,500,000 L (2,774,000 U.S. gal)
- Website: www.thedubaiaquarium.com

The Dubai Aquarium and Underwater Zoo (Arabic: دبي أكواريوم وحديقة الحيوانات المائية) is a public aquarium located in the Dubai Mall. It is the biggest aquarium in Dubai and one of the largest in the world. It has the largest glass tank viewing panel at 107 feet wide and 27 feet tall.

== History ==
The aquarium officially opened on November 4, 2008, along with the rest of the mall. It was developed by Emaar Properties, the same developer of the mall. At its time of opening, it was one of the largest aquariums in the world and received the Guinness World Record for largest shopping mall aquarium. Annually, the aquarium has about 5 million visitors.

On February 25, 2010, the tank had a leak and the whole aquarium was evacuated. Six divers accessed the damage and it was said to be caused by a "small crack".

== Exhibits ==
The Dubai Aquarium features over 300 species of 33,000 different animals including 400 sharks and rays. There is also a 48-meter long, 270 degree glass shark tunnel that goes through the tank and is similar to one in the Georgia Aquarium. There are three zones of the aquarium: rainforest, rocky shore, and ocean. The underwater zoo is on the top floor and features crocodiles, the largest one is named "King Croc".

The tank holds 10 million liters of water and spans 107 feet wide. It can be viewed on three different floors of the mall. It holds the world record for largest tank viewing panel in the world.

== Gallery ==
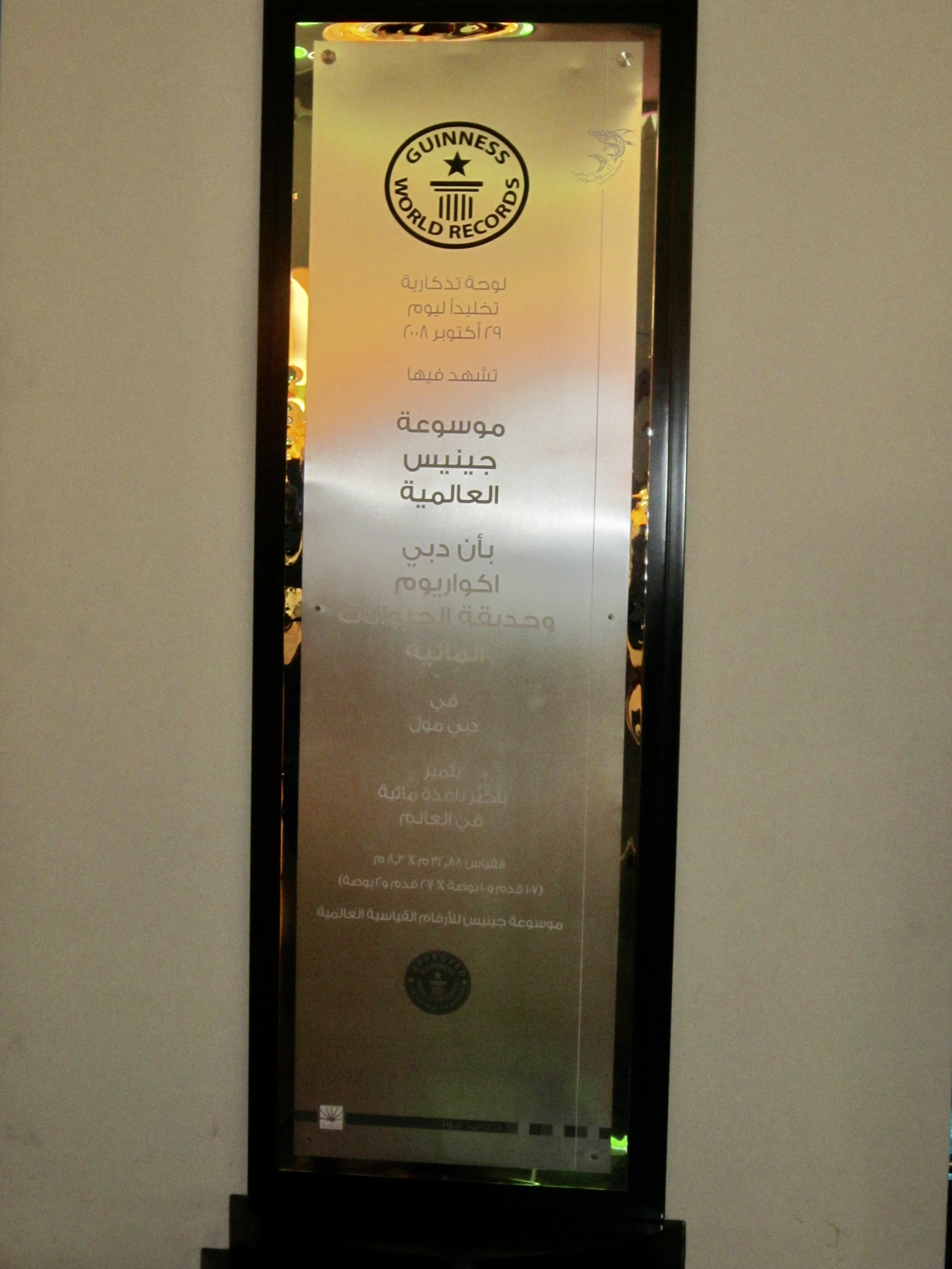
Guinness World Record plaque

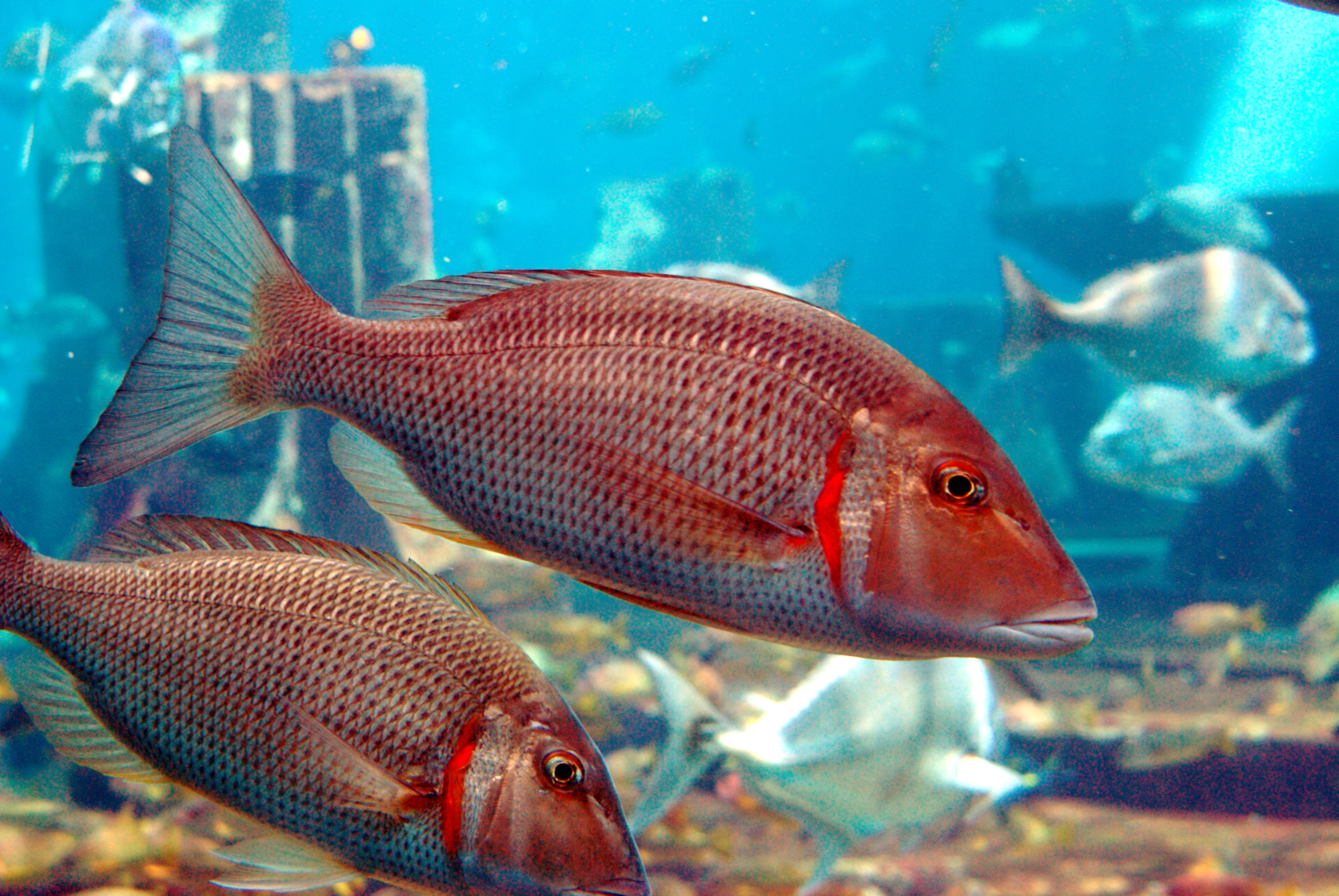

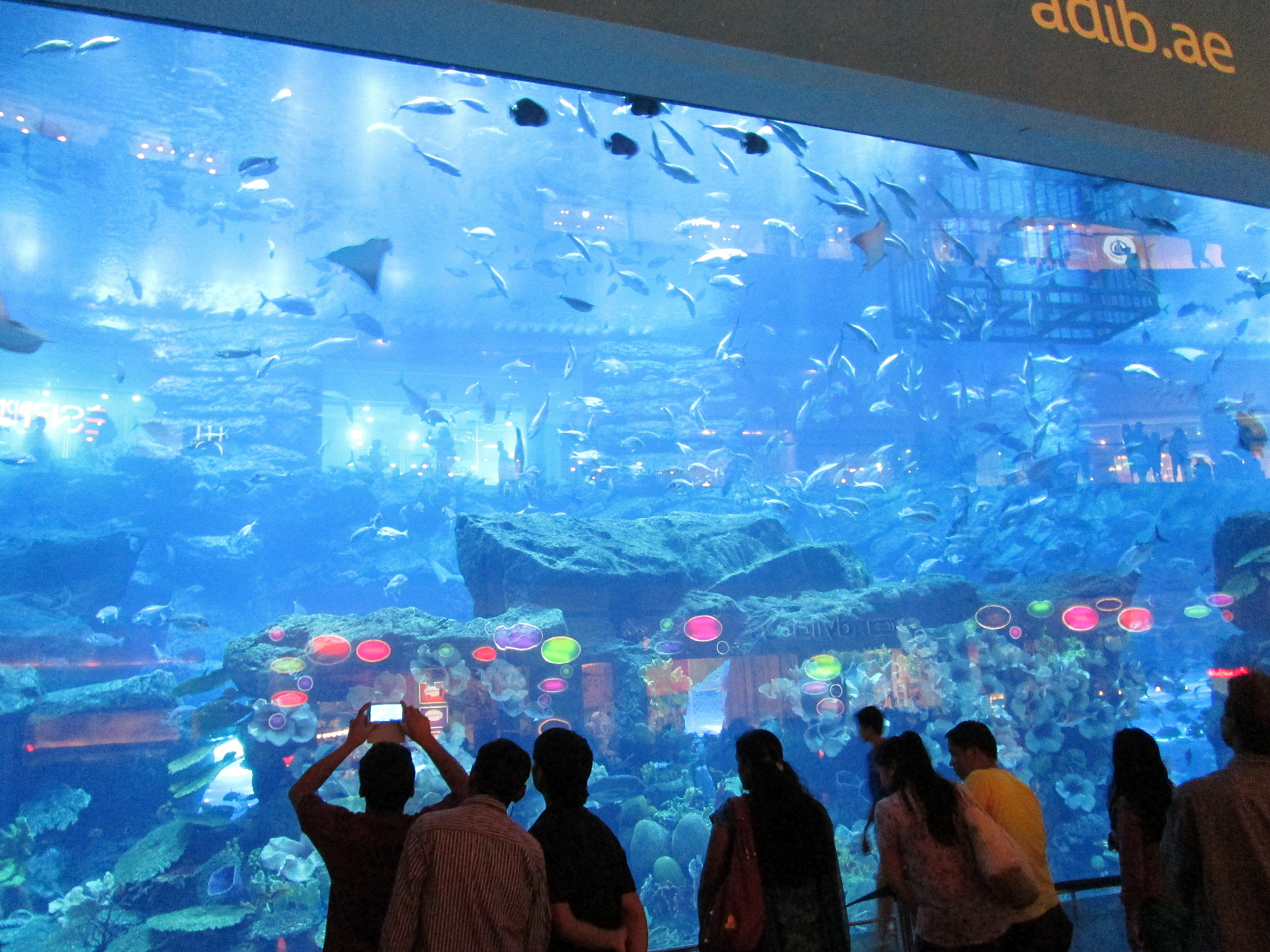

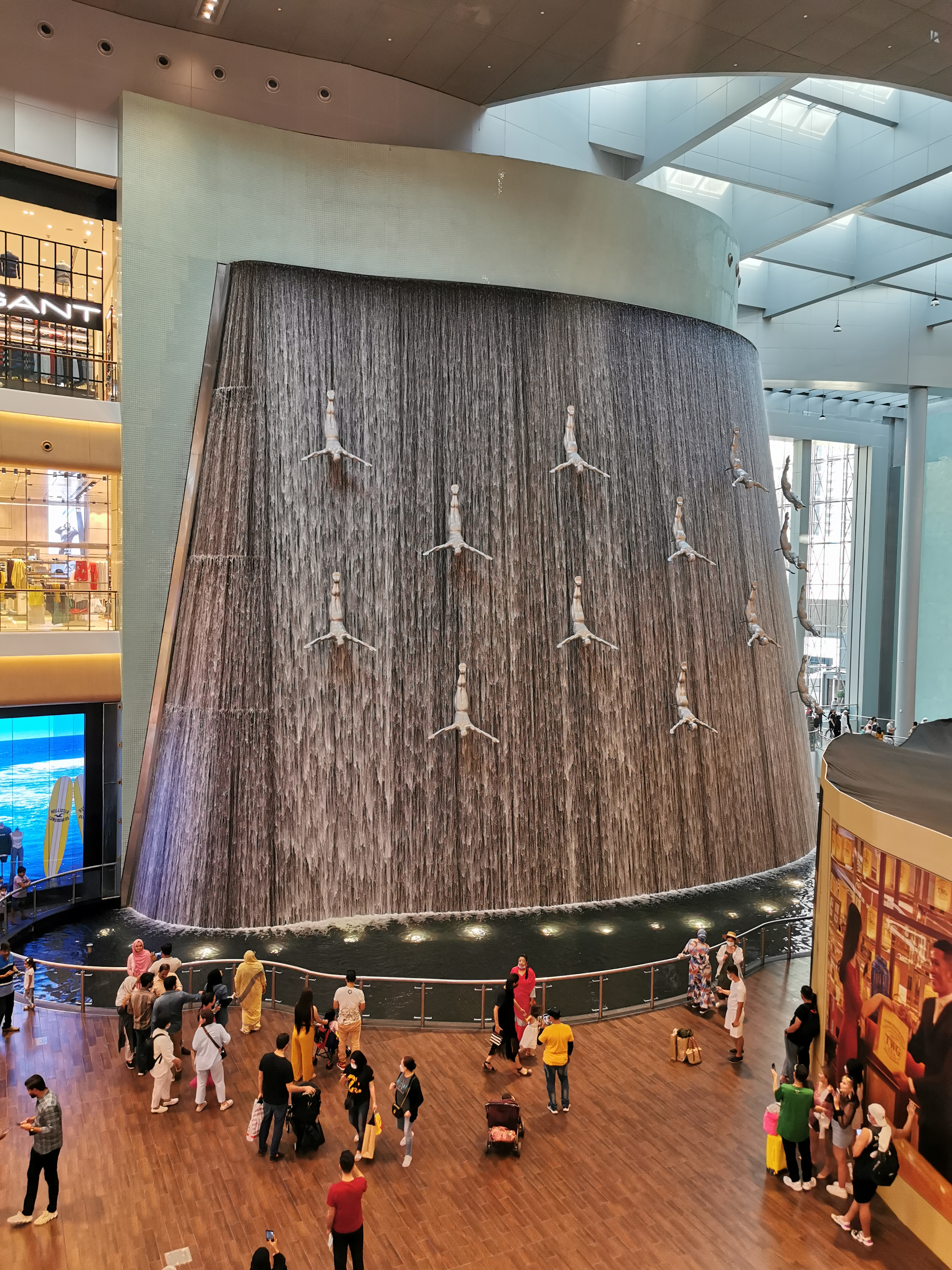
Waterfall

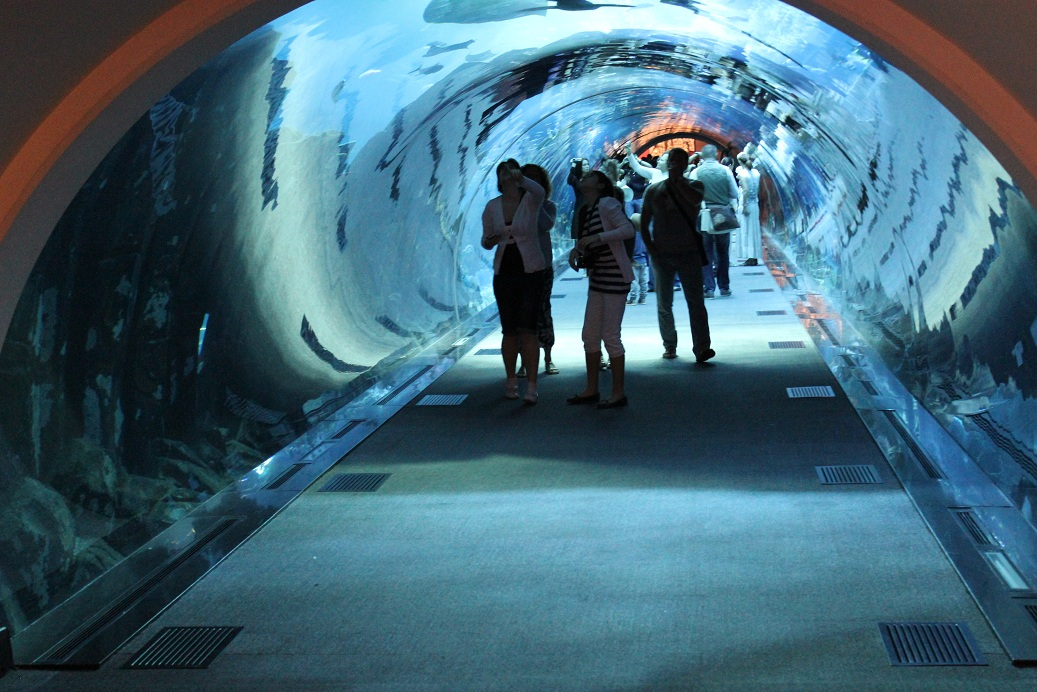
Shark tunnel

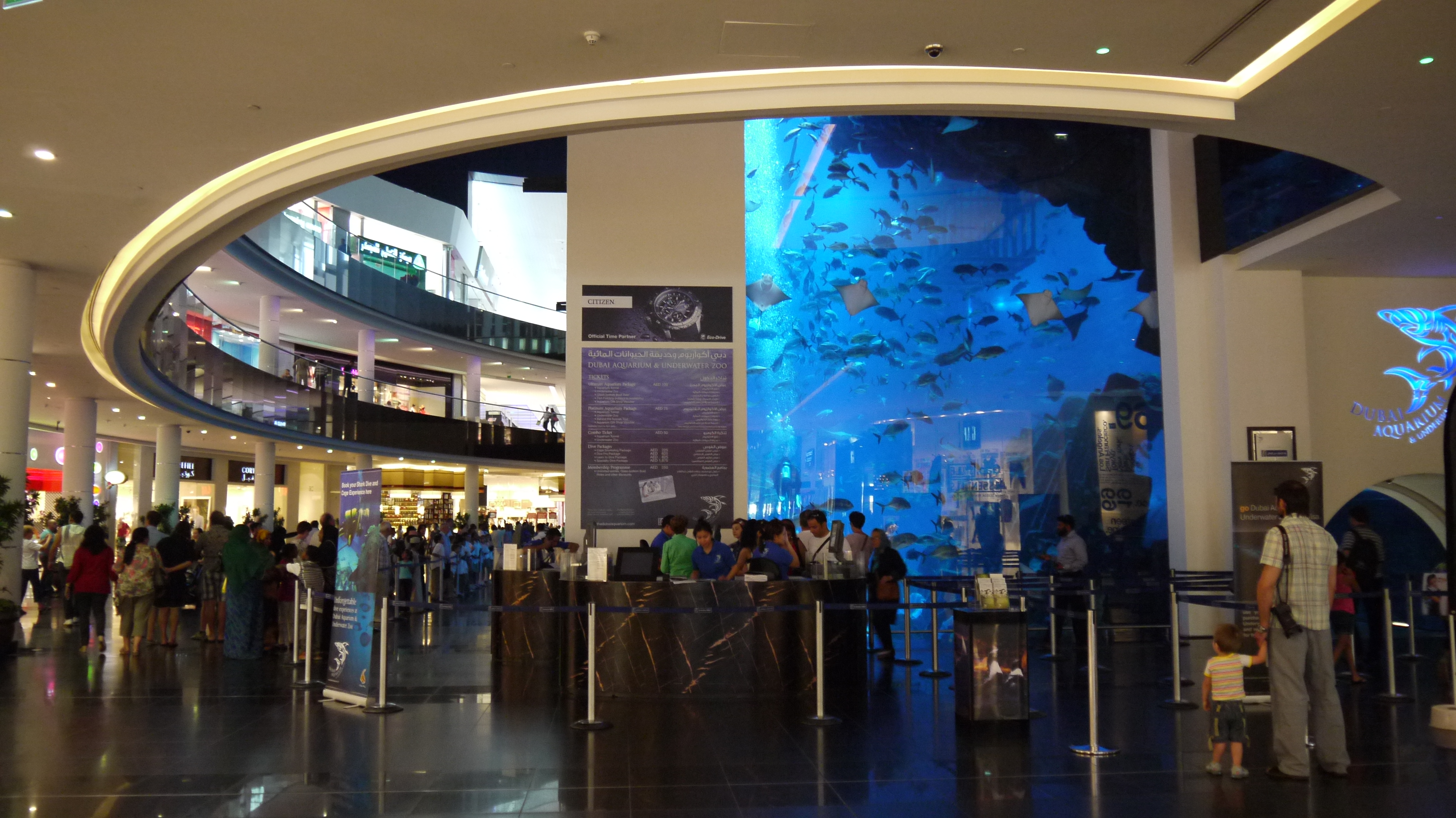
Entrance

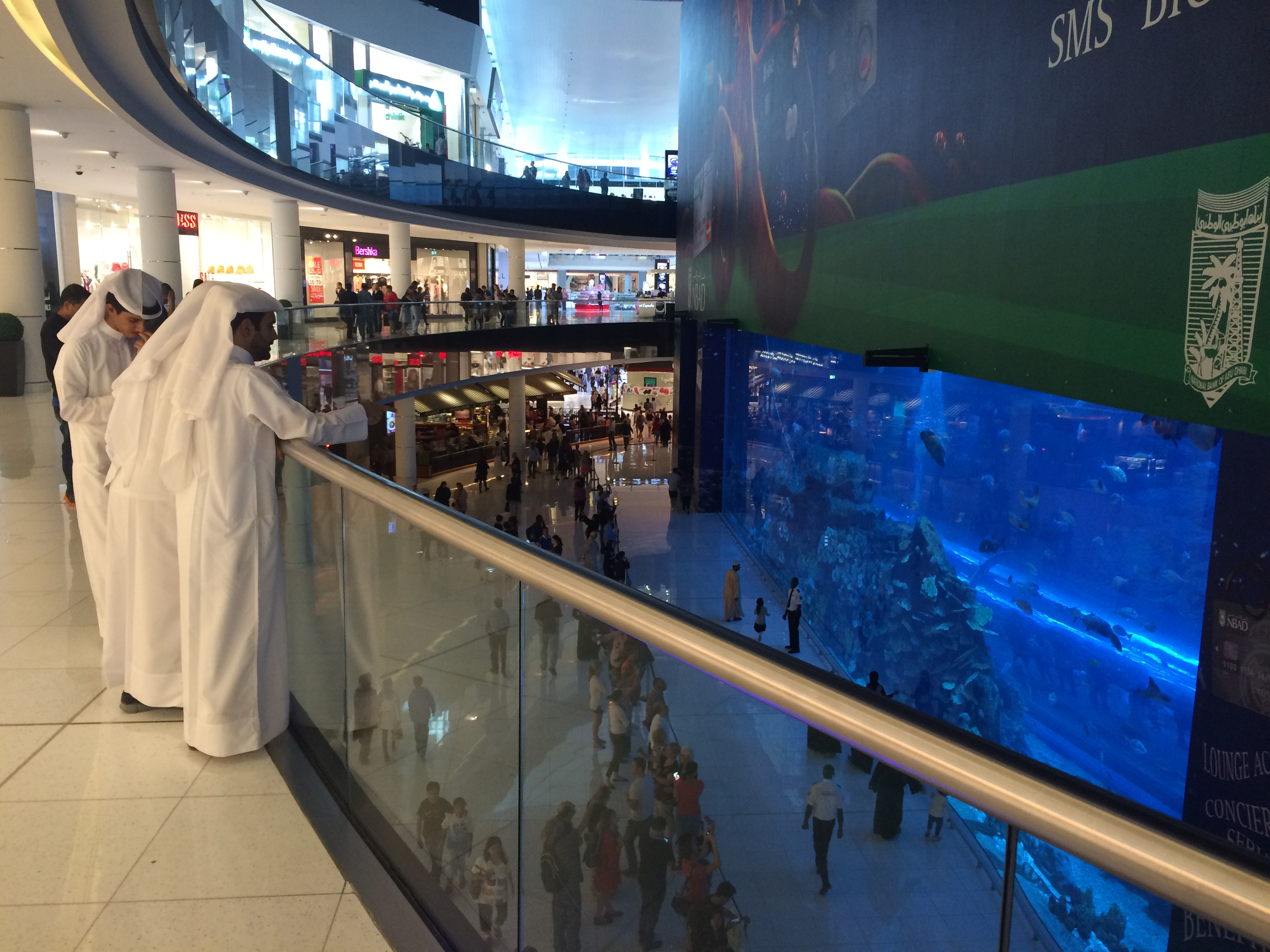
View from balcony

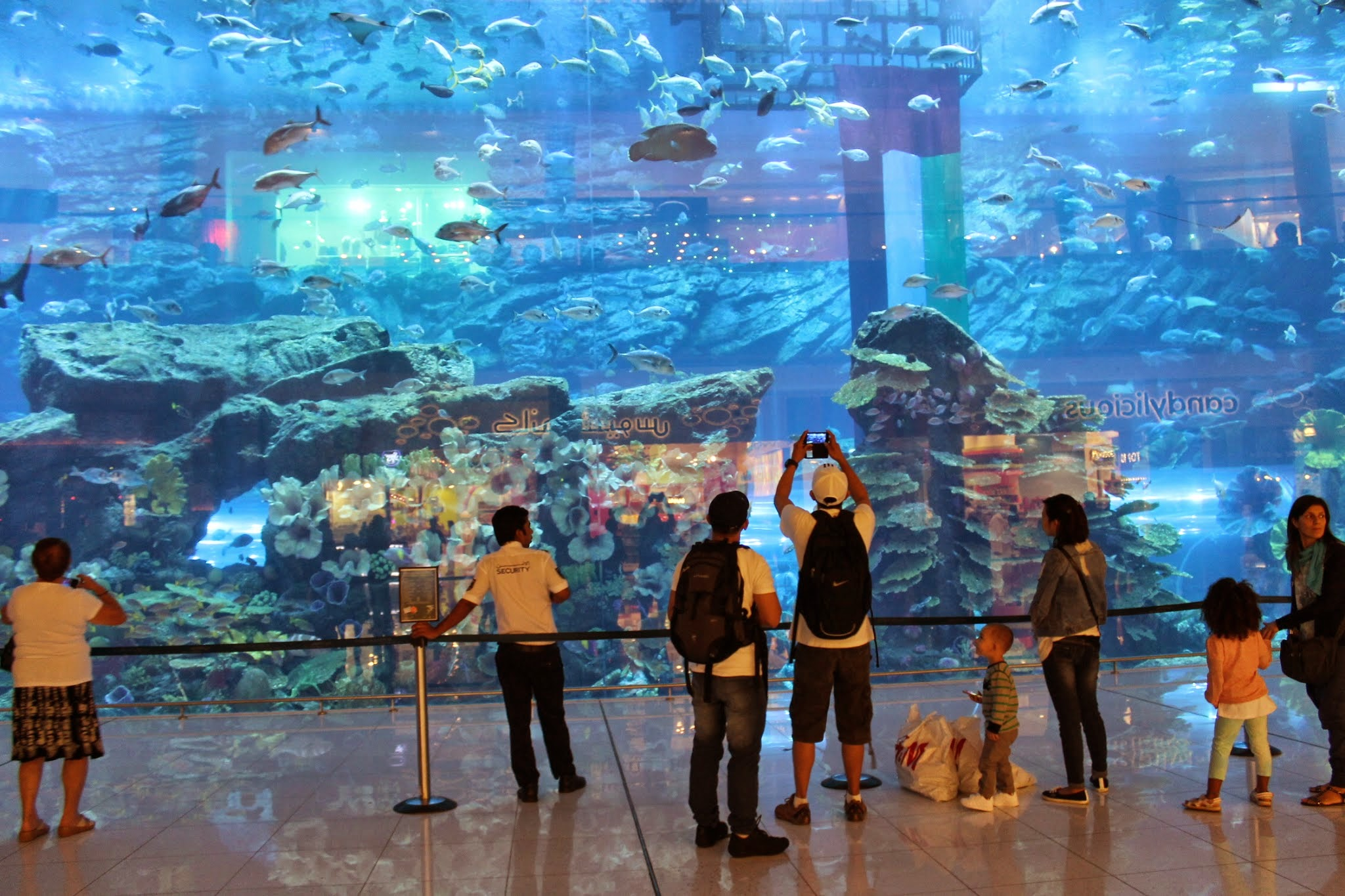

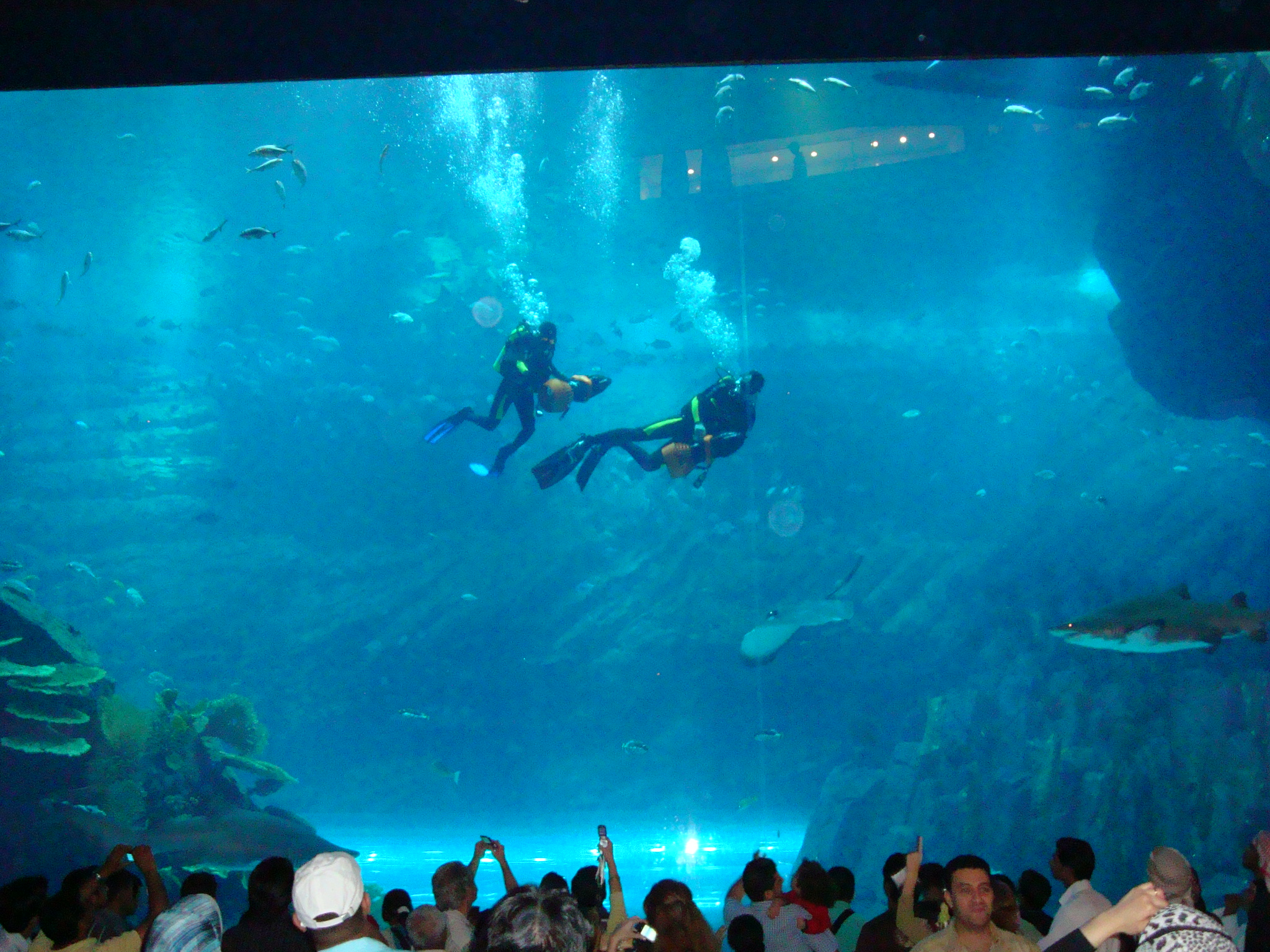
Divers

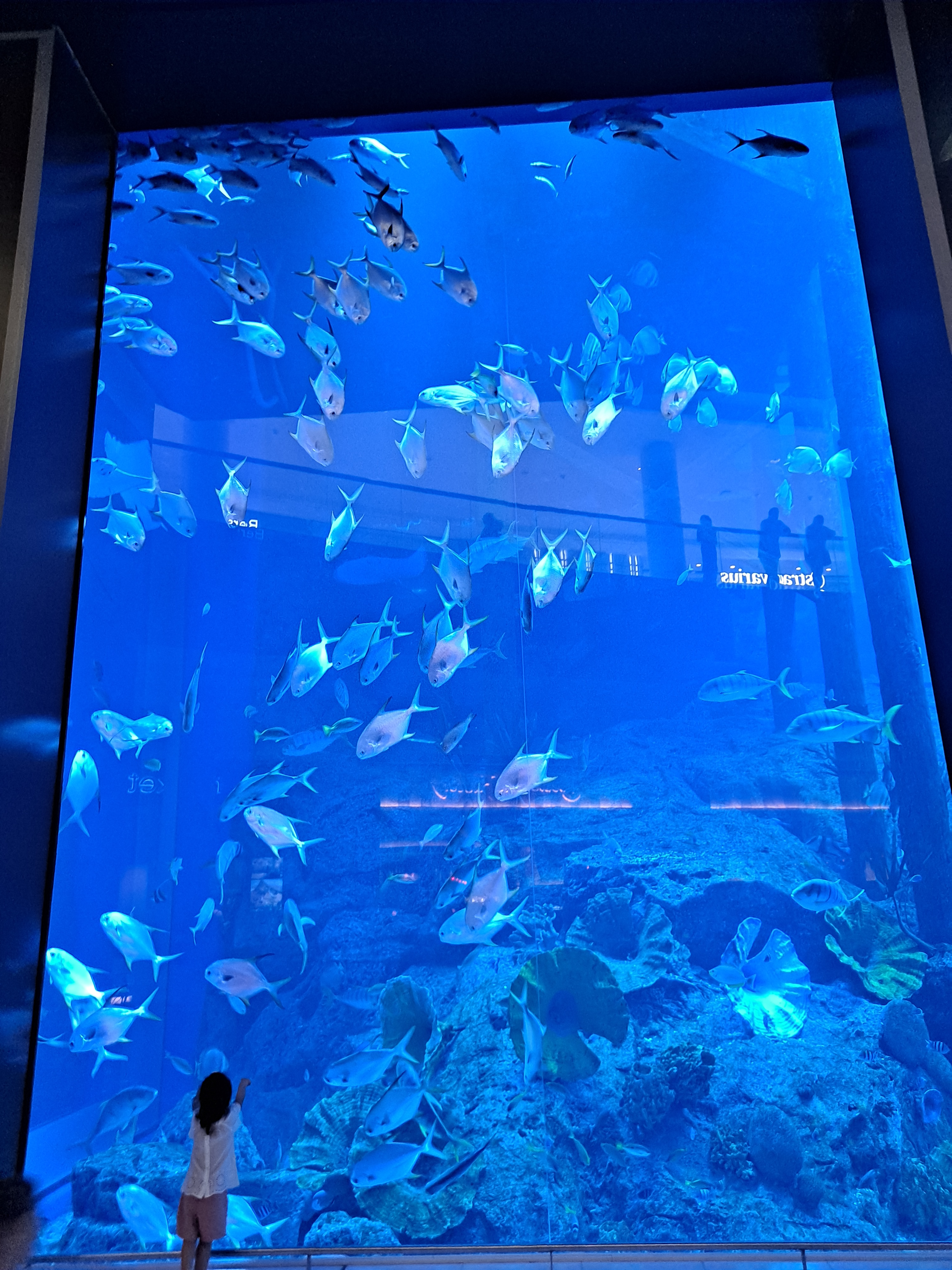

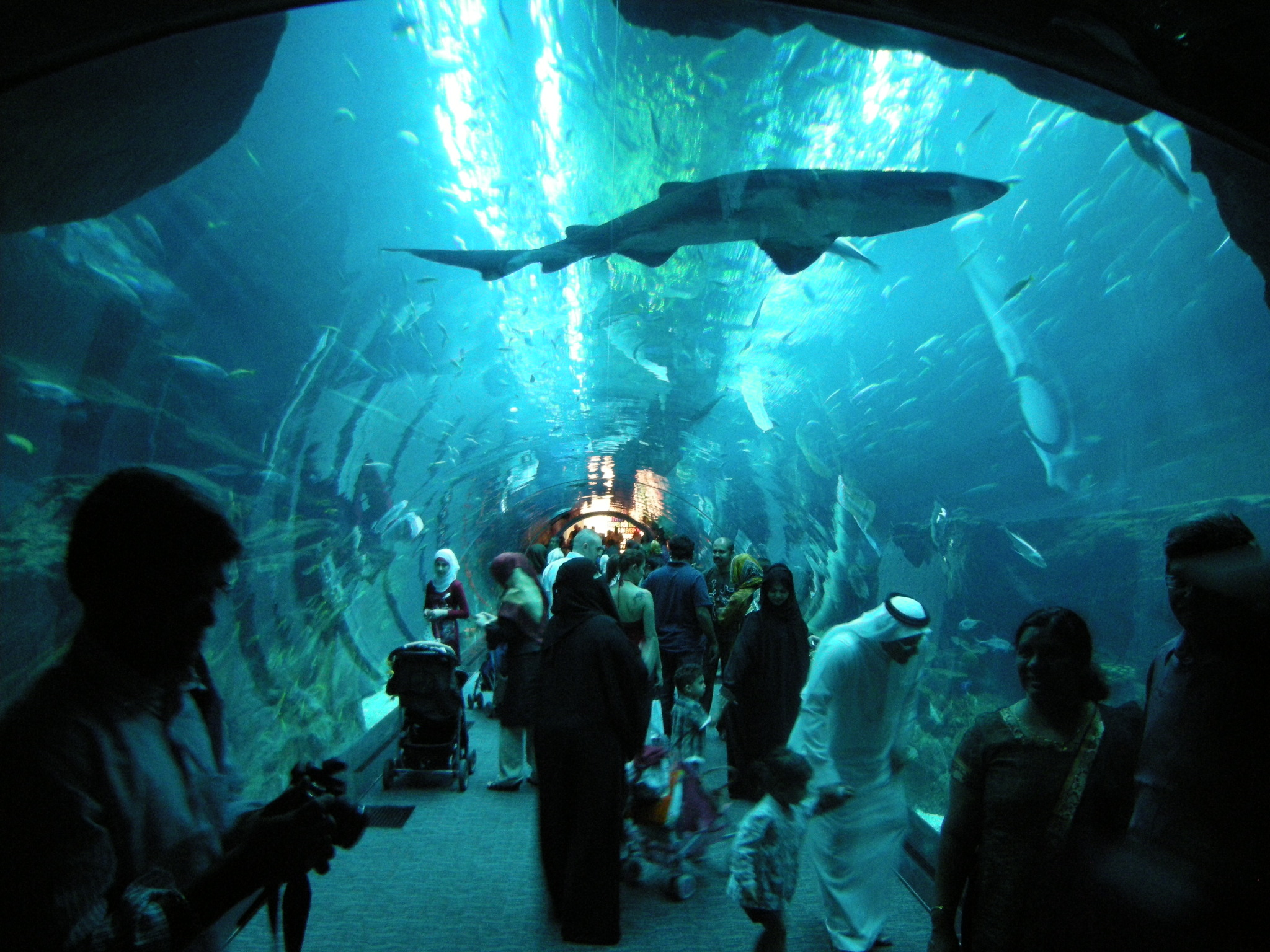
Shark tunnel

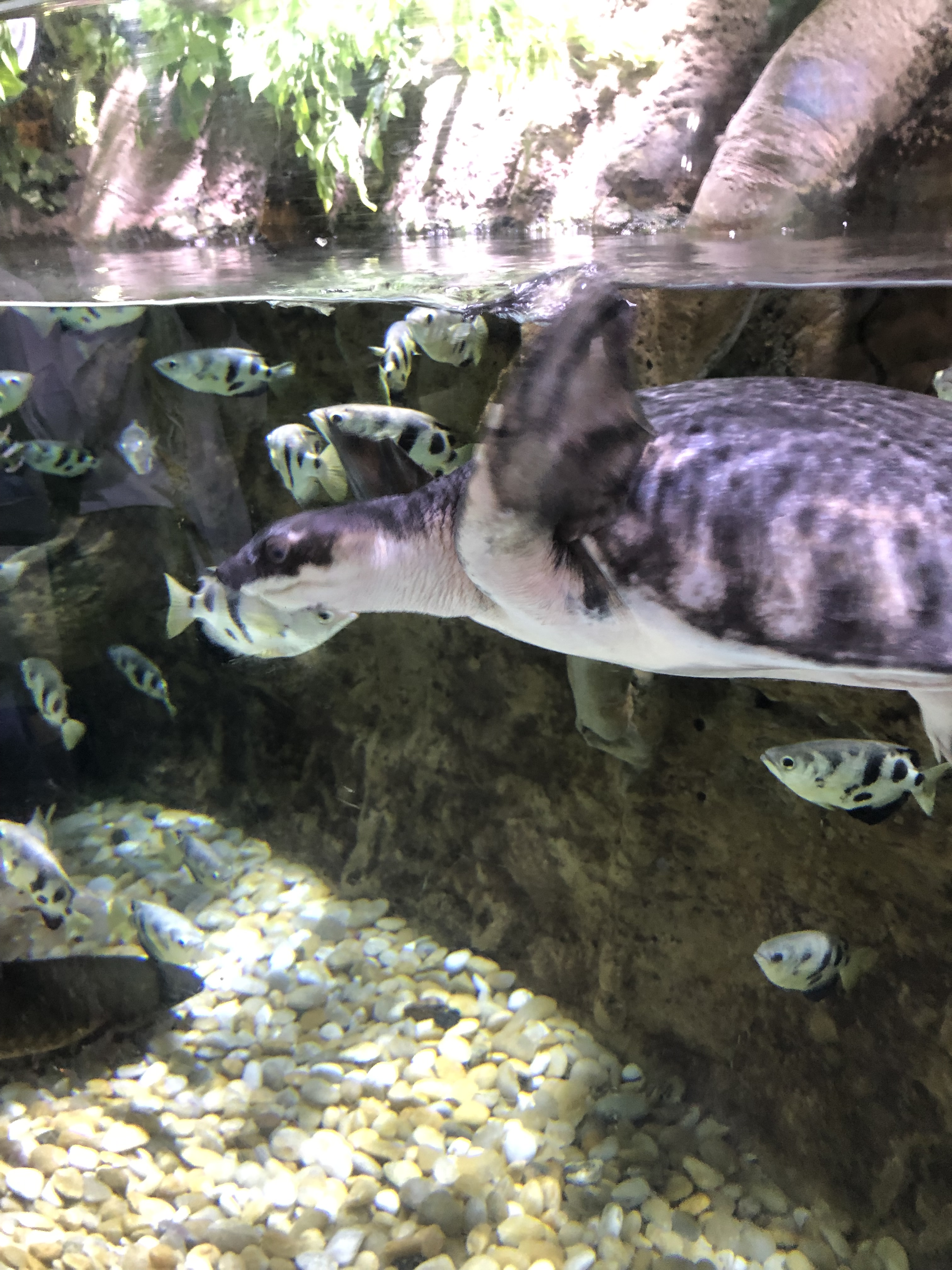
Turtle

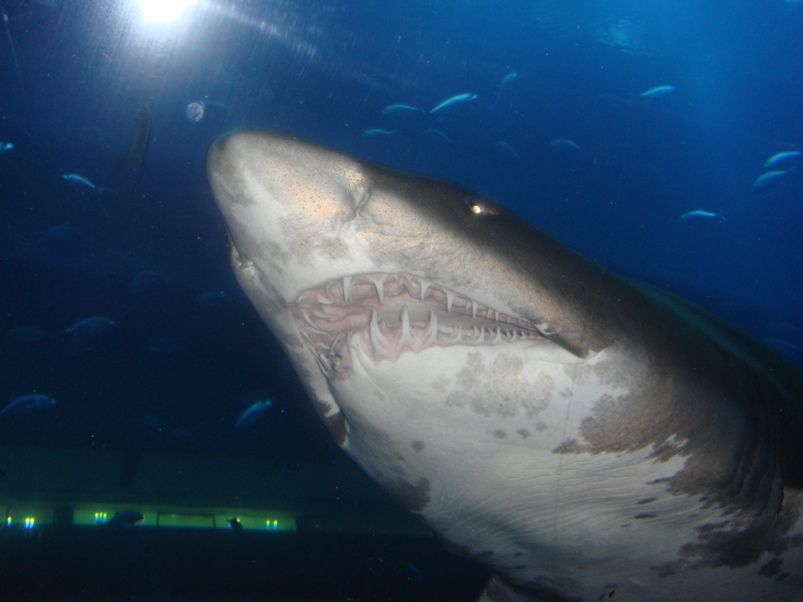
Shark

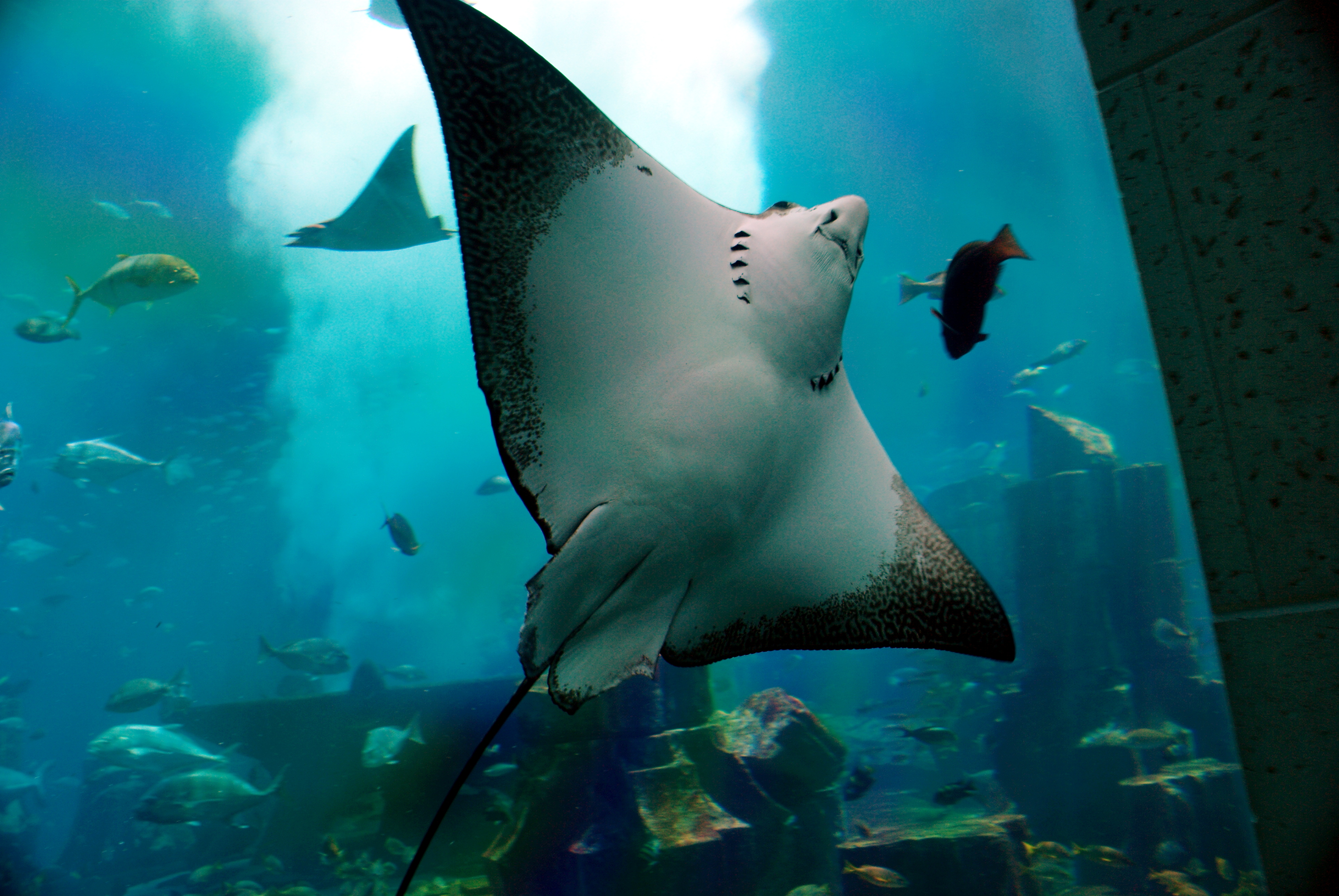
Sting ray

== See also ==
- List of largest aquariums
