= Ocean Parkway =

Ocean Parkway may refer to:

- Ocean Parkway (Brooklyn), a boulevard in the west-central portion of the New York City borough of Brooklyn
  - Ocean Parkway (BMT Brighton Line), an express station on the New York City Subway's BMT Brighton Line
- Ocean Parkway (Long Island), a parkway that traverses Jones Beach Island between Jones Beach State Park and Captree State Park on Long Island, New York

== See also ==
- Ocean Park (disambiguation)
