= Ocean Park =

Ocean Park may refer to:

== Places ==
=== Settlements ===
==== United States ====
- Ocean Park, Santa Monica, California
- Ocean Park, Maine
  - Ocean Park Historic Buildings
- Ocean Park, Oregon, adjacent to Beverly Beach
- Ocean Park (Santurce), San Juan, Puerto Rico
  - Ocean Park Beach
- Ocean Park, Washington

==== Other countries ====
- Ocean Park, Surrey, British Columbia, Canada
- Ocean Park, Uruguay

=== Oceanaria and amusement parks ===
- Ocean Park Aquarium, Shark Bay, Western Australia
- Ocean Park Hong Kong
- Manila Ocean Park, Philippines
- Cebu City Ocean Park, Philippines
- Ocean Park, an amusement park in BSD City, Indonesia

=== Railway stations ===
- Ocean Park station, a metro station near Ocean Park Hong Kong
- Ocean Park station (Staten Island Railway), New York, US

== Other uses ==
- Ocean Park (horse) (foaled 2008), a New Zealand Thoroughbred racehorse

== See also ==
- Ocean Parkway (disambiguation)
- Ocean World (disambiguation)
- Marine park
