= Farm House II =

2014 Chinese animated family adventure comedy film

- Directed by: Kerr Xu
- Production companies: Shanghai Hippo Animation; Hunan TV Aniworld Satellite TV tudou.com
- Release date: October 1, 2014 (China)
- Running time: 80 minutes
- Country: China
- Box office: ¥17.01 million (China)

Farm House II (Chinese: 81号农场之疯狂的麦咭) is a 2014 Chinese animated family adventure comedy film directed by Kerr Xu. It was released on October 1 in China.

== Voice cast ==
- Shen Dawei
- Feng Junhua
- Cu Cu
- Liu Yuxuan
- Yang Menglu
- Xia Lei
- Xie Tiantian
- Su Xin
- Ni Kang
- Wang Yuhang
- Yang Ou
- Hai Fang

== Box office ==
By October 7, the film had earned ¥17.01 million at the Chinese box office.
