= Marineland =

Marineland may refer to:

- Marineland of Antibes, an oceanarium in Antibes, France; closed in 2025
- Marineland of Canada, an oceanarium and amusement park in Niagara Falls, Ontario, closed in 2024
- Marineland Catalunya, a water park in Spain
- Marineland of Florida, an oceanarium in Florida
  - Marineland, Florida, the community where the oceanarium is located
- Marineland Mallorca, a dolphinarium in Spain
- Marineland of New Zealand, an oceanarium in Napier, New Zealand; closed in 2008
- Marineland of South Australia, an oceanarium in West Beach, South Australia; closed 1988
- Marineland of the Pacific, an oceanarium on the Palos Verdes Peninsula, California; closed 1987

== See also ==
- Marine World (disambiguation)
- Waterland (disambiguation)
