= Jungle Master =

2013 Chinese animated film

- Chinese theatrical poster.
- Directed by: Kerr Xu
- Written by: Steve Kramer
- Story by: Kerr Xu; Yman Jie
- Produced by: Kerr Xu; Michael Kuan; Lu Hua; Bill J. Gottlieb (English)
- Starring: Li Chuanying; Yuling Jiang; Yang Menglu; Gao Qichang; Xiaobing Wang; Zhang Xin; Anqi Zhang; Li Zhengxiang; English Cast: Victoria Justice; David Spade; Josh Peck; Jon Lovitz; Christopher Lloyd; Jane Lynch
- Edited by: Kerr Xu
- Music by: Sam Chem
- Production company: Shanghai Hippo Animation
- Distributed by: grindstone entertainment group
- Release date: January 19, 2013
- Running time: 90 minutes
- Country: China
- Language: Mandarin
- Box office: $800,000

Jungle Master (Chinese: 绿林大冒险) is a 2013 Chinese computer-animated film directed by Kerr Xu. The English dub was written by Steve Kramer and features the voices of Victoria Justice, David Spade, Josh Peck, Jon Lovitz, Christopher Lloyd, and Jane Lynch.

In 2016, there was a sequel to the film titled Jungle Master 2: Candy Planet.

== Plot ==
When a girl named Rainie runs away from home after her mom Ilene forgot about her 12th birthday, she is accidentally transported from the big city to an enchanted jungle planet where she meets a Lumore named Blue. With the help of Blue's adoptive grandfather Dr. Sedgewick and their newfound friends Mulla and Tulla, they embark on an epic adventure to help Blue become the leader he is destined to be and save the rainforest from Ilene and Dr. Sedgwick's villainous boss named Boss Cain.

== Cast ==
- Li Chuanying
- Yuling Jiang
- Yang Menglu
- Gao Qichang
- Xiaobing Wang
- Zhang Xin
- Anqi Zhang
- Li Zhengxiang

=== English cast ===
- Victoria Justice as Rainie, a 12-year-old girl who is accidentally transported to the jungle planet.
- David Spade as Boss Cain, a crooked businessman who wants to use the material from the jungle planet to preserve the Earth.
- Josh Peck as Blue, a Lumore who Rainie befriends.
- Jon Lovitz as Mulla, a Lumore who helps Blue through his rite of passage.
- Christopher Lloyd as Dr. Sedgwick, a scientist operating on the jungle planet who adopts Blue.
- Jane Lynch as Ilene, the workaholic mother of Rainie.
- Michael McConnohie as Dr. Wells, one of the scientists that works for Boss Cain.
- Shondalia White as Tulla, a Lumore who is a friend of Mulla and helps Blue through his rite of passage.
- Jason Sarayba as Justin, a friend of Ilene.

Additional voices by Bill J. Gottlieb, Wes Hubbard, Steve Kramer, and Michelle Ruff.

== Sequel ==
The film later had a sequel in 2016 called Jungle Master 2: Candy Planet. While Shondalia White is the only cast member to reprise her role, the English dub has different voice actors like Cherami Leigh voicing Rainie, Robbie Daymond voicing Blue, Derek Stephen Prince voicing Mulla, Dorothy Elias-Fahn voicing Ilene, and new characters voiced by Cam Clarke, Sandy Fox, Bob Glouberman, Michael P. Greco, Todd Haberkorn, and Doug Stone.
