= Shanghai Hippo Animation =

Chinese animation film studio

- Type: Private
- Industry: Animation
- Genre: Family animation
- Founded: 2003
- Founder: Kerr Xu
- Headquarters: Shanghai, China
- Key people: Kerr Xu (CEO and producer)
- Products: Animen; Jungle Master; Farm House
- Owner: Kerr Xu
- Parent: SJS Computer Science and Technology

Shanghai Hippo Animation Co., Ltd. (Chinese: 上海河马动画设计股份有限公司) is the largest computer animation film studio in China. Founded in Shanghai in 2003, Hippo Animation specializes in the creation of original content, as well as software development and the development of CG animation technologies. The company has also built a nationwide distribution infrastructure. The studio's first animated feature film, Animen, was released in China in 2010, and internationally in 2011. Since this release, the studio has released four animated films in theaters across China and internationally.

== History ==
Kerr Xu founded Hippo Animation in 2003 with five people and ¥35,000. The company was issued a Certificate of Video Production by the People's Republic of China State Administration of Radio, Film and Television, and is supported by the Shanghai government.

As of October 2014, the studio's growing workforce is approaching 1,000 employees, and the studio has the capacity to produce 4-5 films annually.

Xu also is the founder and CEO of Hippo's parent company, SJS Computer Science and Technology, a solutions and tool development company for CG film making. SJS's proprietary patents and plug-ins for commercial CGI platforms, including Autodesk Maya and Nuke, are used in-house at Hippo. Animators at Hippo are able to complete 6–7 seconds of quality facial animation per day, versus the industry standard of 1–2 seconds per day.

In 2013, Hippo struck feature film co-production deals with two Australian companies, announcing that almost $90 million worth of animated films will be produced in Western Australia as part of the deal, including plans to launch a $50 million China-Australia co-production film fund. One of the partnerships saw Australia's VUE Group, including VFX supervisor Gyuri Kiss (Matrix Reloaded, Watchmen), collaborate on Farmhouse II and Kung Fu Style. In 2014, Xu announced plans to build the Asian Hollywood, complete with a training facility for Chinese students, in Western Australia.

Hippo has also licensed its content to Netflix, the first deal of its kind between Netflix and a Chinese studio.

== Key personnel ==
- Kerr Xu, founder, CEO, and General Manager. Xu is the son of top aerospace engineers in China. After gaining extensive experience in the business management, investment, and entrepreneurial sectors in the US, where he founded successful startup companies in industries ranging from medical equipment to IT, Xu returned to China, where he became the investment controller for the Fosun International prior to starting Hippo. Xu has been referred to as the Walt Disney of China.
- Yang Wen Yan, Company President, appointed May, 2014. Yang is the former president of Toonmax Media, a part of Shanghai Media Group, and broadcaster to 60 million children across China. She is also a venture capital investor in film and TV, with expertise in movie merchandising and distribution.

== Filmography ==
Film	Year	Format	Territories
Animen	2010	2D & 3D	China, USA, Russia, Turkey, Thailand
Animen 2	2012	2D & 3D	China
Jungle Master	2013	2D & 3D	China, USA, South Korea
Farm House	2013	2D & 3D	China, USA
Farm House II	2014	2D & 3D	China, Australia, ongoing international release
Kung Fu Style	2015	2D & 3D	China, Australia, ongoing international release
Water Planet	2016	2D & 3D	In production for worldwide release

== Gaming and interactive cinema ==
In 2013, Hippo was invited by the Publicity Ministry of the Shanghai Municipal Committee to attend the 9th China (Shenzhen) International Cultural Industry Fair, and exhibit its simulation game system, intelligent cinema experience, and interactive movie technologies. These technologies were also exhibited at the Second Shanghai Pudong Cultural Creative Industry Exhibition.

== Community engagement ==
In partnership with the Parinama Cultural Development Foundation, a non-profit organization based in Shanghai, Hippo has organized free screenings of 3D films across hundreds of schools, villages, orphanages, and remote areas throughout China. Over the past two years, approximately 40,000 children have had their first 3D film experience.

== Awards ==
- Kerr Xu has been honored by the national government of China with two of the highest official awards China bestows upon citizens for their contributions and achievements, being named as one of the “Top One Thousand Talents in China” and one of the “Top One Hundred Talented Entrepreneurs of Shanghai.”
- MOCA honorable mention in the 5th Chinese Original Mobile Phone Animation Game competition (2011).
- AniMen - Silver Award at the 2012 Xingyun Awards. This is the only international prize for Chinese-language sci-fi writers and movie makers.
- Jungle Master - Silver Golden Dolphins award at the 2013 Xiamen International Animation Festival.
