= Aqua Planet Jeju =

Hanwha Aqua Planet Jeju
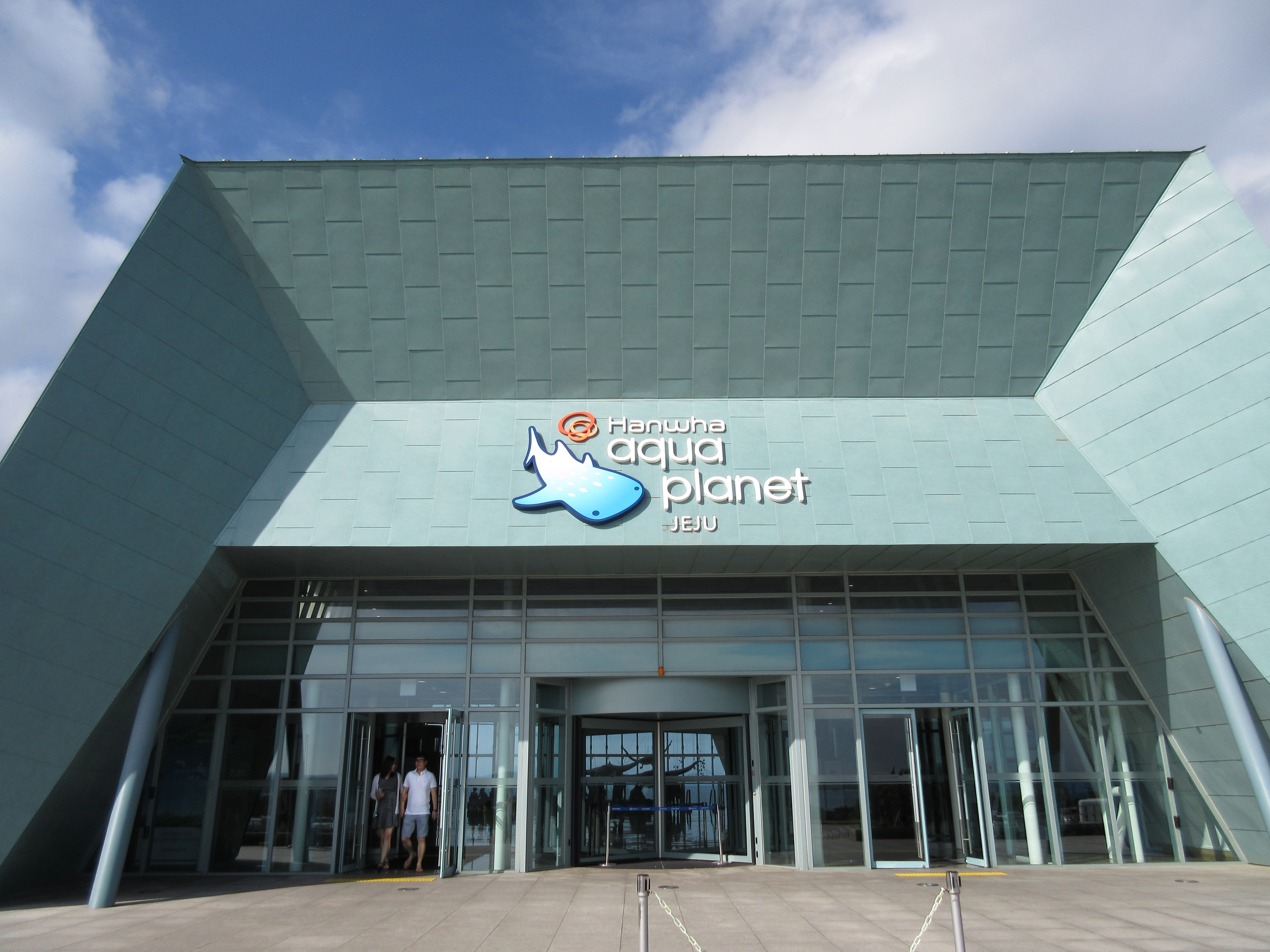
- Entrance
- Interactive map of Hanwha Aqua Planet Jeju
- 33.4328°N 126.9278°E
- Date opened: 2012
- Location: Jeju Province, South Korea
- Floor space: 25,600 m^{2} (276,000 sq ft)
- No. of animals: 48,000
- No. of species: 500
- Volume of largest tank: 5,300,000 litres (1,400,000 US gal)
- Total volume of tanks: 10,800,000 litres (2,853,000 US gal)
- Management: Hanwha Group
- Website: www.aquaplanet.co.kr/jeju/index.do

Hanwha Aqua Planet Jeju (Korean: 아쿠아 플라넷 제주) is an aquarium that opened in 2012 in the Jeju Province, South Korea. It is an aquarium operated by Aqua Planet and is the largest public aquarium in South Korea.

== Exhibits ==
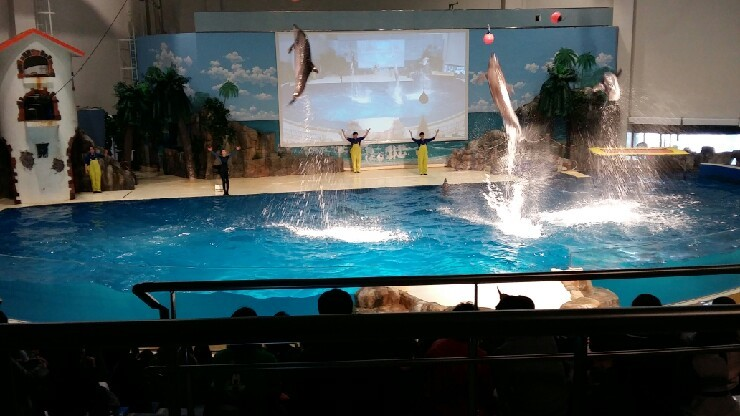
Dolphin Performance in Ocean arena

Aqua Planet Jeju, It consists of three marine-themed halls, consisting of an "ocean arena" (performance hall) and a "marine science" (science museum) and "aquarium". The main tank, The Sea of Jeju, has a water volume of 5,300 m^{3} (1,400,000 US gal) and is the largest tank in South Korea. Large sharks and rays such as Sand Tiger and Giant guitarfish are bred in the aquarium. There is also a tunnel inside the aquarium. The main creatures are penguins, seals, sea lions, walruses, arapaima gigas, various fishes, sand tiger sharks, giant groupers.

In addition, the public aquarium carries out regular beach cleaning and underwater purification work, and has established South Korea's first specialized medical center for marine life, and is engaged in many activities for the conservation of marine life. In addition, Aqua Planet Jeju has educational programs such as a diving experience program in the main tank and an ecological briefing session for otters and penguins.

Aqua Planet Jeju has started a special exhibition of Minions for about a year from July 31, 2020.

=== Shows ===
The aquarium has a large dolphin and walrus show. Many shows are held in Ocean arena and are hosted by the Eastern European Synchronized Swimming Team.

=== Controversies ===
Initially, two whale sharks and one manta ray were captivity in the main tank. However, it received a lot of criticism from animal rights groups because one whale shark and one manta ray died. An official at Aqua Planet Jeju explained that "the cause of death of fish is chronic renal failure and there is no cure", but public opinion moved to release the remaining whale shark, so it was tagged and released.

== See also ==
- Aqua Planet
- Aqua Planet 63
- Hanwha Group
