= List of Aria chapters =

Aqua and Aria is a utopian science fantasy manga written and illustrated by Kozue Amano. The series is set in the 24th century on a terraformed Mars, and follows a young woman named Akari as she trains as an apprentice gondolier. Aqua was originally published by Enix in its Monthly Stencil magazine in 2001 and collected in two tankōbon volumes. When the series moved to Mag Garden's Comic Blade magazine in February 2002, the title changed to Aria. Mag Garden later re-released the two volumes of Aqua with additional material and new covers. Serialization completed in February 2008. In all, the 70 serialized chapters of Aqua and Aria were collected in 14 tankōbon volumes released between 3 October 2003 to 10 March 2008 in the Mag Garden editions. Each volume, called a "voyage", contains five chapters called "navigations", covering a season of the Aqua year.

The series has been adapted by Hal Film Maker as a 54-episode anime television series, with a first season broadcast in 2005 on TV Tokyo Network, a second season in 2006, an OVA released September 2007, and a third season in 2008 that ended around the same time as the manga serialization. A new OVA, called Aria the Avvenire, was released in the 10th anniversary Blu-Ray Box sets of the anime series between 24 December 2015 and 24 June 2016.

In English, Aria (but not Aqua) was originally licensed by ADV Manga, who dropped the license after publishing three volumes. The North American license for Aqua and Aria was picked up by Tokyopop, which began releasing the series, starting with the first volume of Aqua on 9 October 2007. The series has been licensed in France by Kami, in Germany by Tokyopop Germany, in Italy by Star Comics, in Indonesia by M&C Comics, in South Korea by Bookbox, in Spain by Editorial Ivrea, in Taiwan by Tong Li Comics, and in Thailand by Bongkoch Comics.

In 2017, Tokyopop released a collector's edition of the Aqua and Aria chapters as Aria: The Masterpiece in seven volumes. They also plan to reprint the series in 2021 given enough advance orders.

== Chapters and volumes ==
=== Aqua ===
No.	Original release date	Original ISBN	English release date	English ISBN
1	27 July 2001 (Enix); 3 October 2003 (Mag Garden)	978-4-7575-0504-9 (Enix); 978-4-901926-89-8 (Mag Garden)	9 October 2007	978-1-4278-0312-2
"Navigation 01: The Water Planet" (水の惑星, "Mizu no Wakusei"); "Navigation 02: The Guide on the Water" (水先案内人, "Mizusaki Annainin"); "Navigation 03: The City Submerged" (水没の街, "Suibotsu no Machi"); "Navigation 04: The Kingdom of Cats" (猫の王国, "Neko no Ōkoku"); "Navigation 05: The Hill of Hope" (希望の丘, "Kibō no Oka")
Akari Mizunashi lands at Neo-Venezia spaceport on Aqua (formerly called Mars) to become an undine, or gondolier tour-guide. She is met by a Martian cat who takes her luggage into a postman's gondola. She stays with them through the day, enjoying the quiet pace of life compared to Manhome (formerly Earth) and practicing her rowing, until the postman drops her off at Aria Company, her new employer. She meets her mentor, Alicia, and learns the cat is the company president. The next day, Akari is told she learned to row gondolas backwards. As she practices the correct way, she meets Aika, a trainee from a rival gondoliering company, who agrees to become friends to have an excuse for seeing Alicia more often, and that afternoon they train together. During the annual floods at the start of summer, when tours and training stop, Akari is caught outdoors in a rain shower and meets Aika by coincidence. Akari ends up sleeping in Aika's company dorm room, and wakes in the night see the flooded piazza outside the window brightly lit by Aqua's two moons. While practicing their rowing, Aika and Akari follow President Aria down a channel they'd never noticed before, ending up in a labyrinthine flooded warehouse they can't get out of until President Aria shows them the way. As they leave, Akari sees dozens of cats behind them, including Cait Sith, the legendary king of Aqua's cats. On the morning after Aika is promoted to journeyman (Single), Alicia packs a picnic and has Akari row them along a crowded canal to a hill overlooking the city. Along the way, other rowers wish Akari luck, and upon arrival Alicia removes one of Akari's gloves, promoting her to Single for having successfully passed the canal test.
2	27 March 2002 (Enix); 3 October 2003 (Mag Garden)	978-4-7575-0647-3 (Enix); 978-4-901926-90-4 (Mag Garden)	12 February 2008	978-1-4278-0313-9
"Navigation 06: My First Customer" (初めてのお客様, "Hajimete no Okyakusama"); "Navigation 07: It's Hard Being President!" (社長はツライよ, "Shachō wa Tsurai yo"); "Navigation 08: Night-light Bells" (夜光鈴, "Yakō Rin"); "Navigation 09: Enter the Hero!" (ヒーロー見参, "Hīrō Kenzan"); "Navigation 10: Fireworks" (花火, "Hanabi"); "Bonus Navigation: Colds and Pudding" (風邪とプリン, "Kaze to Purin")
Six months after her arrival on Aqua, Akari is hired by her first customer, Akatsuki, a trainee salamander (climate controller) visiting the surface, because she is cheaper than a full undine (Prima). Although she is too slow while rowing correctly, Akatsuki insists as a fellow trainee that Akari not relinquish the gondola to Alicia, and Akari turns the gondola around to row backwards and so arrives at his cable-car stop on time. During Aria Company's annual cleaning day, President Aria is eager to help Alicia and Akari but ends up getting in the way; depressed, he runs away but returns home in time for dinner. In San Marco Square Akari buys a windchime with a noctilucent clapper, a summer specialty of Aqua, and hangs it on Aira Company's balcony. The glow lasts for a month and when it dies, the clapper drops off into the sea, leaving behind a rare crystal. President Aria dresses up as a cat superhero from his favorite anime and works hard at performing a heroic deed: returning a young girl's lost doll. At the end of summer, Alicia, Akari, and Aika take the cable-car to Akatsuki's floating climate control station, where he gives them a tour. When evening comes they watch a fireworks display together, which Akari never experienced on Manhome, and she adds this to her "treasure chest" of memories of Aqua. In a bonus chapter set much later, Akari and Alice bring Aika pudding when she is laid up with a cold.

=== Aria ===
No.	Original release date	Original ISBN	English release date	English ISBN
01	10 October 2002	978-4-901926-12-6	1 April 2004 (ADV); 8 January 2008 (Tokyopop)	978-1-4139-0040-8 (ADV); 978-1-4278-0510-2 (Tokyopop)
"Navigation 01: Neo-Venezia" (ネオ·ヴェネツィア, "Neo Venetsia"); "Navigation 02: Gondola Hauling" (陸揚げ, "Rikuage"); "Navigation 03: Bridge of Sighs" (ため息橋, "Tameikibashi"); "Navigation 04: Sun Shower" (お天気雨, "Otenki Ame"); "Navigation 05: Vogare Longa" (ヴォガ·ロンガ, "Voga Ronga")
Twelve months after her arrival on Aqua, Akari meets a tourist separated from his daughter and son-in-law and helps look for them. When he complains about the inconvenience of Neo-Venezia compared to Manhome, she says she enjoys the slow pace of life, which includes eating freshly baked potatoes, a food no longer cooked on Manhome. They watch the autumn leaves fall, and when they find his daughter he tells Akari she is a "wonderful undine". When Aika helps clean Aria Company's gondolas, she is annoyed by Akari's slowness as she stops to look at rainbows in a water spray or an oily puddle, but eventually relaxes. When the trainees later admire Alicia's rowing, Aika says they both will also become great undines because they love gondolas. Akari meets Akatsuki waiting for someone who is already late, and to pass the time gives him a tour as "a friend" of central Neo-Venezia. She tells the story of the original Bridge of Sighs but says she sighs instead at their city's beauty. When Akatsuki's older brother finally shows up, he says that anyone who can keep Akatsuki occupied for several hours must be a good undine. Alicia and Akari visit an island with a reproduction of a Japanese Inari shrine to view the fall foliage. After they get separated during a sunshower, Akari meets a wedding procession of fox spirits and offers them her inarizushi, and they leave her alone. Before the annual long-distance gondola race, Aika tells Akari the rumor it is a secret test for becoming a full undine, but during the race itself Akari has too much fun rowing to rush and decides to become an undine at her own pace. When she finally reaches the finish, Alicia tells them the rumor is a myth.
02	10 March 2003	978-4-901926-36-2	1 July 2004 (ADV); 13 May 2008 (Tokyopop)	978-1-4139-0071-2 (ADV); 978-1-4278-0511-9 (Tokyopop)
"Navigation 06: Snow Bug" (雪虫, "Yuki Mushi"); "Navigation 07: Utopia" (桃源郷, "Tōgenkyō"); "Special Navigation: A Day in the Life of the President" (社長の日常, "Shachō no Nichijō"); "Navigation 08: Voices of the Stars" (星の謳, "Hoshi no Utagoe"); "Navigation 09: Auguri Di Buon Anno" (アウグーリオ·ボナーノ, "Augūrio Bonāno"); "Navigation 10: Carnival" (謝肉祭, "Shanikusai")
At the start of her first winter on Aqua, Akari meets her first Snow Bugs (hand-sized flying woolly aphids) while collecting firewood with Alicia. One returns with her to the city, staying with her as the weather turns colder before leaving for its winter home in the forest just before the first snowfall. Aika hears Akari has never been to a hot spring and suggests they visit one on their next day off. Alicia invites herself along, and when Akari feels guilty for not practicing, tells her trainee that rejuvenating the spirit is as important to an undine as gondola practice. A series of single-page comics depict episodes in President Aria's daily life. Akari and Aika meet Al, a novice gnome (regulator of Aqua's gravity) visiting the surface on a shopping trip, and offer to help him return underground with his purchases. Al shows them his workplace, and Akari compares the sound of the gravity-augmenting machinery to Aqua "singing with the voice of a star". At the New Year's Eve celebration in San Marco Plaza, Akari learns that Neo-Venezia has adopted the Italian New Year's customs of eating beans and throwing away something that has been used. As she tosses her undine cap in the air at midnight, Akari regrets leaving the old year, with all its new experiences, but vows to do her best in the new one. During the Carnival, Akari and Aika catch a glimpse of Casanova, the mysterious masked master of ceremonies, but get separated while chasing him. Akari is invited to join Casanova's masked procession, and in the end he gives her a jasmine flower before revealing he is Cait Sith and President Aria is one of his attendants.
03	10 July 2003	978-4-901926-71-3	1 November 2004 (ADV); 9 September 2008 (Tokyopop)	978-1-4139-0089-7 (ADV); 978-1-4278-0512-6 (Tokyopop)
"Navigation 11: The First Gale of Spring" (春一番, "Haru Ichiban"); "Navigation 12: Under Cherry Blossoms in Full Bloom" (満開の森の桜の下, "Mankai no Mori no Sakura no Shita"); "Navigation 13: Town Treasure" (街の宝物, "Machi no Takaramono"); "Navigation 14: Three Major Fairies" (水の3大妖精, "Mizu no 3 Dai Yōsei"); "Navigation 15: Festa del Bocolo" (ボッコロの日, "Bokkoro no Hi")
A year after Akari's arrival on Aqua, she and Aika meet Alice, an apprentice undine (Pair) with impressive rowing skills. Used to jealousy from older undines, Alice bluntly refuses their company and accepts Aika's challenge to a race. Akari speeds ahead by rowing backwards but, distracted by picking the first flowers of spring, finishes last. When Akari asks whether rowing is fun, Alice agrees with a smile. Alicia takes Akari on a picnic to look for spring, but while following an old railway line she chooses the wrong fork. They find an abandoned rail-car beneath a large blooming cherry tree, and while they admire it Alicia tells a story about the importance of mistakes in serendipity. Akari, Aika, and Alice find in a borrowed gondola a map that sends them on a treasure hunt. The final clue leads them to a beautiful hilltop view of Neo-Venezia, and they return the clues where they found them so others can find this treasure for themselves. Aika runs away to Aria Company after a fight with her strict mentor, Akira, who follows her, and the trainees learn that their mentors have been friends and rivals since childhood. Akira sets Akari and Aika to a gondola race to determine where Aika will stay, but partway through Aika stops because she plans to return, as she respects Akira for being the only Himeya employee to stand up to her as heir to the company. On Feste del Bocolo—a day when men give a single red rose to the women he loves—Akatsuki calls Akari for help carrying the baskets of roses he wishes to give Alicia. Because he's nervous of approaching Alicia, he practices presenting them to Akari. Alicia sees this and wishes the two well in their relationship.
04	10 February 2004	978-4-86127-016-1	1 December 2008	978-1-4278-0513-3
"Navigation 16: Neverland" (ネバーランド, "Nebārando"); "Navigation 17: Traveling Water" (逃げ水, "Nigemizu"); "Navigation 18: Flying Fish in the Sky" (空を泳ぐ魚, "Sora o Oyogu Sakana"); "Navigation 19: The Legendary Major Fairy" (伝説の大妖精(グランドマザー), "Gurandomazā"); "Navigation 20: The Redentore" (レデントーレ, "Redentōre")
At the start of her second summer on Aqua, Akari receives a mysterious invitation that directs her to a hidden bay, where she meets Aika and Alice following similar invitations. There they find Alicia and Akira, who sent the invitations at President Aria's instruction, and together they spend a relaxing day swimming in the ocean, which Akari could not do back on Manhome. While shopping for a noctilucent windchime on a day hot enough for mirages to appear on the ocean, Akari feels dizzy and sees the market as empty of people. She follows President Aria to a cool cafe that serves only ice-cold milk because it is a refuge for the city's cats, where humans don't belong. Cait Sith gives her a cat-shaped windchime, and when she leaves, the cafe turns into a boarded up building and the people return. Akari meets Woody, a sylph (airborne deliveryman) with a bad sense of direction who has lost his map. She offers to guide him to his destination, and he takes her on a wild "swim" through the streets culminating in a view of Neo-Venezia from the sky. Akari, Aika, and Alice visit "Grandma" Akino, once the best undine of Neo-Venezia and founder of Aria Company, now in retirement in the countryside. When Aika asks for advice, Grandma has the trainees help with domestic chores, which Aika interprets as tests that will make them better undines. That night, Grandma reveals that the secret to becoming a good undine is to enjoy every moment. Akari, Aika, and Alice are assigned a charter boat for Redentore, the end-of-summer thanksgiving festival, as a live exercise in hospitality. The evening is successful, and their guests thank them for bringing them together.
05	10 August 2004	978-4-86127-062-8	3 November 2009	978-1-4278-0514-0
"Navigation 21: Mailman-san" (郵便屋さん, "Yūbin'ya-san"); "Navigation 22: Canzone" (舟謳(カンツォーネ), "Kantsōne"); "Navigation 23: The Night of the Meteor Showers" (流星群の夜, "Ryūseigun no Yoru"); "Navigation 24: Margherita" (マルガリータ, "Marugarīta"); "Navigation 25: Shadow Chasing" (影追い, "Kage Oi")
At the start of Akari's second autumn on Aqua, Mr. Postman borrows Akari and her gondola for a day while his is repaired. After rowing him through the city collecting the mail, she realizes that while letters are less convenient than e-mail, they have a hand-made charm much like Neo-Venezia, and he tells her she has adapted to Neo-Venezia's lifestyle. When Akari stays with Alice one night, she meets Athena, Alice's roommate and mentor, and third of the Three Water Fairies. Because Athena is clumsy and spacy, Alice describes her as useless as her own left hand, but Akari sees Athena assist Alice in small ways that Alice doesn't notice and tells Alice that left hands can be useful. The next day at school, Alice notices her left hand supporting what her right hand does, and when she returns to her room she thanks Athena for singing to lift up her spirits. When Akari learns there will be a meteor shower one night, Aika invites Al along to watch them. Aika takes them to the rooftop of a Himeya branch office, but when Akari leaves her alone with Al, she finds herself getting flustered. When Akira trains Aika, Akari, and Alice, she is critical of their performances. For the last exercise of the day, she uses the rising tide to trap their gondola behind some low-lying bridges, and only after several failures do the three trainees find a route out through a flooded basement. While waiting for Alicia get out of a meeting, Akari spends the day in a cafe with a man who calls himself a "master at enjoying San Marco Square". When Alicia's meeting ends, she tells Akari the man is the cafe's owner, and when they part, he calls Akari a "master of happiness".
06	11 January 2005	978-4-86127-110-6	28 December 2010	978-1-4278-0515-7
"Navigation 26: Orange Days" (オレンジな日々, "Orenji na Hibi"); "Navigation 27: Venetian Glass" (ヴェネツィアンガラス, "Venetsian Garasu"); "Navigation 28: Snow White" (スノーホワイト, "Sunō Howaito"); "Navigation 29: Lost Child" (迷子, "Maigo"); "Navigation 30: Night on the Galactic Railroad" (銀河鉄道の夜, "Ginga Tetsudō no Yoru"); "Special Navigation: Parallel World" (パラレルワールド, "Parareru Wārudo")
On a winter day, Alicia tells the three trainees how she, Akira, and Athena started practicing together as journeymen, like their students do now. Alice realizes her trio will also break up when they become full undines, and Athena and Alicia tell her it's important to enjoy the present rather than regret what has been—or will be—lost. When Akari transports glassware in her gondola, the apprentice glassmaker supervising the cargo complains about criticisms of his master's work as "fake" because the long tradition of Venetian glassmaking was broken before being revived on Neo-Venezia. Akari tells him she doesn't believe anything is fake, and while Neo-Venezia may not be the real Venice, it is still a living city, one she treasures for itself. When Akari asks Alicia what she wanted to be when she grew up, Alicia rolls a couple large snowballs with the help of strangers before answering she wanted to become someone who made people have fun. Alice finds an abandoned kitten and names it Maa after its unusual meow. Because pets are forbidden in company dorms, she hides Maa in her wardrobe for a week. When Maa is discovered, Athena rescues it and arranges to have it adopted as the company's new president. Late one night, Akari hears a distant train and imagines it's the train from Night on the Galactic Railroad. The next night, President Aria gives her a ticket and takes her to the railroad tracks, and when a train arrives, several cats are waiting to get on. Before Akari can board, she notices a kitten has lost its ticket and gives it hers, and as the train departs Akari sees the conductor is Cait Sith. In a bonus chapter, President Aria is transported to a parallel world where all the characters are of the opposite sex.
07	10 September 2005	978-4-86127-194-6	—	—
"Navigation 31: The Goddess of Spring" (春の女神, "Haru no Megami"); "Navigation 32: Blackout" (停電, "Teiden"); "Navigation 33: Mirror" (鏡, "Kagami"); "Navigation 34: Vaporetto" (ヴァポレット); "Navigation 35: Hair, Hairpin, and Me" (髪とヘヤピンと私, "Kami to Heyapin to Watashi"); "Special Navigation: Artificial Human" (人造人間, "Jinzō Ningen")
At a barbecue party to celebrate the start of spring, Aika's new hairstyle accidentally catches fire. After Akari and Alice help trim her hair, Aika admits she had grown it longer to be like Alicia. Akira tells her it is impossible to impersonate someone, and she should aim to be a unique undine. The next day, Aika cuts her hair very short to express her "confident new self". When Akari gives a tour as undine, her client notices a lovely garden she didn't know about, to Akari's despair. During a planned blackout that night, because Akari is afraid of the dark, Alicia spends the night in her room, where they discover how beautiful the bright starlight is, and Akari concludes that there will always be beautiful things to still be discovered. When Aika and Akari visit Alice in her room at Orange Planet, Athena invites them to stay the night. During the evening, Athena sees Alice deals better with her friends than her peers, whom Alice sees as jealous, and tells Alice people mirror your attitudes toward them. After watching Maa make great efforts to climb onto a bed, Alice decides to try socializing more. To find out why Akari knows so many locals even though she's an immigrant, Aika and Alice secretly follow her as she runs errands. After watching her chat with other passengers on a vaporetto ferry, they conclude it's because she's naturally nice to everyone and so brings people together. After Aika buys cute new hairpins, she spends the day distracted by the urge to show off her new hairstyle to Al, though the thought of doing so embarrasses her. With Akari and Alice's encouragement, she visits Al, who likes the change. A bonus chapter depicts Akatsuki at six years old, when he believed he was an artificial human.
08	10 January 2006	978-4-86127-224-0	—	—
"Navigation 36: Gondola" (ゴンドラ, "Gondora"); "Navigation 37: Amnesia" (記憶喪失, "Kioku Sōshitsu"); "Special Navigation: A Girl's Heart" (女心, "Onna Kokoro"); "Navigation 38: Cemetery Island" (墓地の島, "Bochi no Shima"); "Navigation 39: Secret Place" (秘密の場所, "Himitsu no Basho"); "Navigation 40: Bonfire" (送り火, "Okuribi")
At the start of summer, Akari learns her training gondola is too worn-out and must be sold as a freight hauler. Akari takes it on a tour of places where she has special memories it was involved in, and that night thanks it and says farewell. During a fight with Alice, Athena trips and is knocked out, and when she wakes cannot remember anyone. With Akari and Alicia's help, Athena's memories slowly return—except her memory of Alice. When Alice starts crying, Alicia makes Athena reveal she'd been faking amnesia to find out what Alice feels about her. In a bonus chapter, during the president cats' annual physical, Alice learns that Maa is female. Aika tells Akari a Manhome ghost story about the spirit of an executed Venetian woman who trapped gondoliers. That night, a lady in black asks Akari for a ride to Isola di San Michele, and on arrival drags Akari into the cemetery, saying she'll keep her forever. Cait Sith appears behind her and she vanishes, and then Akari wakes up outside Aria Company holding a flower petal from the cemetery. The next day, Alice explains the ghost story was invented on Aqua—which makes it even more scary. One afternoon Akatsuki sees Akari on a balcony of St Mark's Basilica and finds the inconspicuous staircase up to her secret place, where she visits a bust looking out over the Piazza at the sea. After Akatsuki promises to keep the place just their secret, Aika and Alice interrupt them, having found the staircase door he left open. At an end-of-summer ceremony where worn-out boats are burnt in the Piazza, after the bonfire goes out, Alice tells Akari she misses summer, and Woody reminds her there's things to do in the autumn as well.
09	10 July 2006	978-4-86127-282-0	—	—
"Navigation 41: Palina" (パリーナ, "Palīna"); "Navigation 42: My Rule" (自分ルール, "Jibun Rūru"); "Navigation 43: Childhood Friend" (幼なじみ, "Osananajimi"); "Navigation 44: Prima Donna" (プリマ·ドンナ, "Purima Donna"); "Navigation 45: Moon Viewing" (お月見, "Otsukimi"); "Special Navigation: Aquamarine" (アクアマリン, "Akuamarin")
At the start of autumn, when Akari notices that Aria Company's distinctive palina (pole for hitching boats) is rotting away, Alicia asks her to make a replacement. Akari designs and paints one based on the company uniform, and as they admire it Alicia tells her the old palina had been made by Grandma Akino's first employee, and that Akari's palina will represent her presence to future Aria Company undines. When Alice sets herself a challenge to walk home from school by stepping only on shadows, she asks Athena to not help her. After Athena says she's an ally of Alice, like an ally character in a video game, Alice accepts her offered shadow to help her walk across an open space. While eating lunch together, Al tells Akari a story (shown in a flashback) about Akatsuki when he was a boy, competing at playground games with two unknown kids. In the present, Alicia reveals the two kids were Akira and herself. Akari admires how the lives of the others circle around and meet again, making her feel like an outsider, but Akira reassures her that she's a part of their community. When Aika is upset by overhearing some Himeya Primas badmouthing Akira, Akira tells her and Akari that backbiting is inevitable in the competitive world of undines, and that you need to not take the good things in life for granted instead of focusing the one bad event that seems to overshadow them. Akari introduces her friends to Japanese Tsukimi customs, but when Al runs late Aika goes off to search for him. After finding him, they fall into a dry well, and while waiting for Maa bring help, they talk about Aqua's two moons, gravitation, and attraction; after Akari and Alice rescue them, as they walk back to Aria Company, Al takes Aika's hand. In a bonus chapter, the busy Akino, Himeya Company's top Prima for 14 years, meets a cat who stares out over the ocean. On a rainy night, she shelters him with her umbrella until dawn, and decides to start living life at his pace by founding Aria Company with him.
10	30 March 2007	978-4-86127-370-4	—	—
"Navigation 46: Birthday" (誕生日, "Tanjōbi"); "Navigation 47: Epiphany" (エピファニア, "Epifania"); "Navigation 48: Traghetto" (トラゲット, "Toragetto"); "Navigation 49: The Four Seasons" (春夏秋冬, "Shunka Shūtō"); "Navigation 50: Extra Lessons" (課外授業, "Kagai Jugyō"); "Special Navigation: Horoscope" (星占い, "Boshi Uranai")
At the start of winter, Akira and Athena visit Aria Company to give Alicia a birthday present, but the latter is too busy with customers. Akari asks Akira if she will supervise her gondola practice, and after searching for Alicia for a few hours, they finally meet her and give her the present. After Alice tells Akari, Aika, and Athena that she is too grown up to believe in La Befana (the Italian equivalent of Santa Claus), they dress up as La Befana and her helpers for Epiphany and give Alice a night as a Bubble Princess. Athena tells Alice that as an adult, you can make anything enjoyable if you put your heart into it. When Akari works on the traghetto ferry for the first time, she learns one of the three Singles she's teamed with, Anzu, recently failed her Prima exam again. At the end of the day, the three praise Akari's rowing ability, and when Anzu says that she keeps taking the exam force herself to improve, she inspires the others to work hard towards taking the exam themselves. On New Year's Eve, when Akari describes the four seasons of Aqua to her pen pal, Alicia describes Akari as pure white and so able to reflect the entire palette of the world. When Alice learns that Alicia has never scolded Akari, she stalks Alicia to find out why. After a week, she asks Alicia directly, who says she believes that criticizing people makes them fear mistakes, and so she prefers encouragement over correction. When Akatsuki finds Akari watching her horoscope on a public television, she explains she uses horoscopes as a way of looking at her day differently.
11	3 October 2007	978-4-86127-401-5	—	—
"Navigation 51: Clover" (クローバー, "Kurōbā"); "Navigation 52: Marriage with the Sea" (海との結婚, "Umi to no Kekkon"); "Navigation 53: Cait Sith" (ケット·シー, "Ketto Shī"); "Navigation 54: A Day Off" (休日, "Kyūjitsu"); "Navigation 55: Twilight" (黄昏時, "Tasogare Doki")
At the start of spring, after watching Alice row and Akari make friends easily, Aika wonders how Akira had felt about being grouped with such natural talents as Athena and Alicia. Akira says that it was hard, then tells a story of meeting Aika as a little girl, who made her a four-leaf clover by adding a rose petal, leading Akira to start making up for lack of talent in other ways. Akatsuki invites Alicia to help chose a ring for the quadrennial "Marriage of the Sea" ceremony, but as Alicia already has a ring she misunderstands it as being for Akari. With Akari's help, he buys and gives Akari a rose ring, which she uses in the ceremony. After Alice notes that Akari's five meetings with Cait Sith each took place at one of the Seven Wonders of Neo-Venecia, Akari visits a sixth wonder, a paving said to bring misfortune. As she steps on it, at Orange Planet Athena tells Alice that meeting Cait Sith is itself the seventh wonder. Akari disappears and finds herself falling through the air high above Neo-Venezia with Cait Sith. He tells her without words that because she is becoming an adult this is the last time they can meet, then gives her an aquamarine necklace, after which Akari wakes up in her gondola. On her first day off after a busy spring tourist season, Akari sleeps in, then spends the day drifting in her gondola. The day after Alice graduates from middle school, Athena gives her the Single's test. While negotiating the last canal lock, Alice admits that singing is her weakness as an undine, to which Athena tells her that if she does not enjoy the song, then no one else will. At the Hill of Hope, Athena has Alice sing a canzone, after which she promotes Alice directly to Prima, the first undine to ever do so, and gives her the title Orange Princess.
12	10 March 2008	978-4-86127-482-4	—	—
"Navigation 56: Lifelike Doll" (生き人形, "Iki Ningyō"); "Navigation 57: The Rose's Name" (薔薇の名前, "Bara no Namae"); "Special Navigation: The Three Girls" (3人娘, "3-nin Musume"); "Navigation 58: Distant Blue" (遙かなる蒼, "Haruka Naru Ao"); "Navigation 59: The Future" (未来, "Mirai"); "Navigation 60: Fairies of the Water" (水の妖精, "Mizu no Yōsei")
At the start of summer, Akari meets a man with two dolls, one smiling and one frowning, which he claims reflects human nature. After hearing Singles gossip about Alice's promotion to Prima ahead of Aika, Akira worries about how Aika is taking it. Aika assures her she is motivated by the competition, and Akira sets Aika's Prima exam for a month later. As a Prima, Alice has little time to see her friends and cannot think of an excuse to call them, even though she misses them. When they pay a surprise visit to her dorm with a pizza, Akari tells her that being a friend is reason enough. At practice one morning, Aika tells Akari they can no longer practice together because she has been promoted to Prima with the title Rosen Queen, and will be managing a new Himeya Company branch office. Alicia sets Akari's Prima exam for the next day, during which she directs Akari down a very narrow, difficult channel. Akari successfully negotiates it and is promoted to Prima with the title Aquamarine. Alicia immediately announces her retirement to get married and work for the Gondola Association. The next several days are busy as Alicia hands the running of Aria Company over to Akari. When Akari finally breaks down crying, Alicia admits that Akari could have been promoted long before but Alicia had delayed the exam to postpone leaving her. At the end of summer, Mr. Mailman hires Akari for a tour, during which he says she is a great undine because she is a master of bringing happiness. In the morning, Akari sees Aria Company filled with memories of Alicia and her friends but, remembering Alicia's advice to stay in the moment instead of stuck in memories, she opens the reception-area shutter to let in the new day. Akari tells her correspondent what has happened to the other characters, ending with an invitation to visit Neo-Venezia and meet her. In the final pages, a new pair, Ai, starts her first morning at Aria Company.

== See also ==
- List of Aria episodes
- List of Aria soundtracks
