= Federal Heights, Colorado =

Home rule city in Adams County, Colorado, United States

- Home rule city
- City of Federal Heights
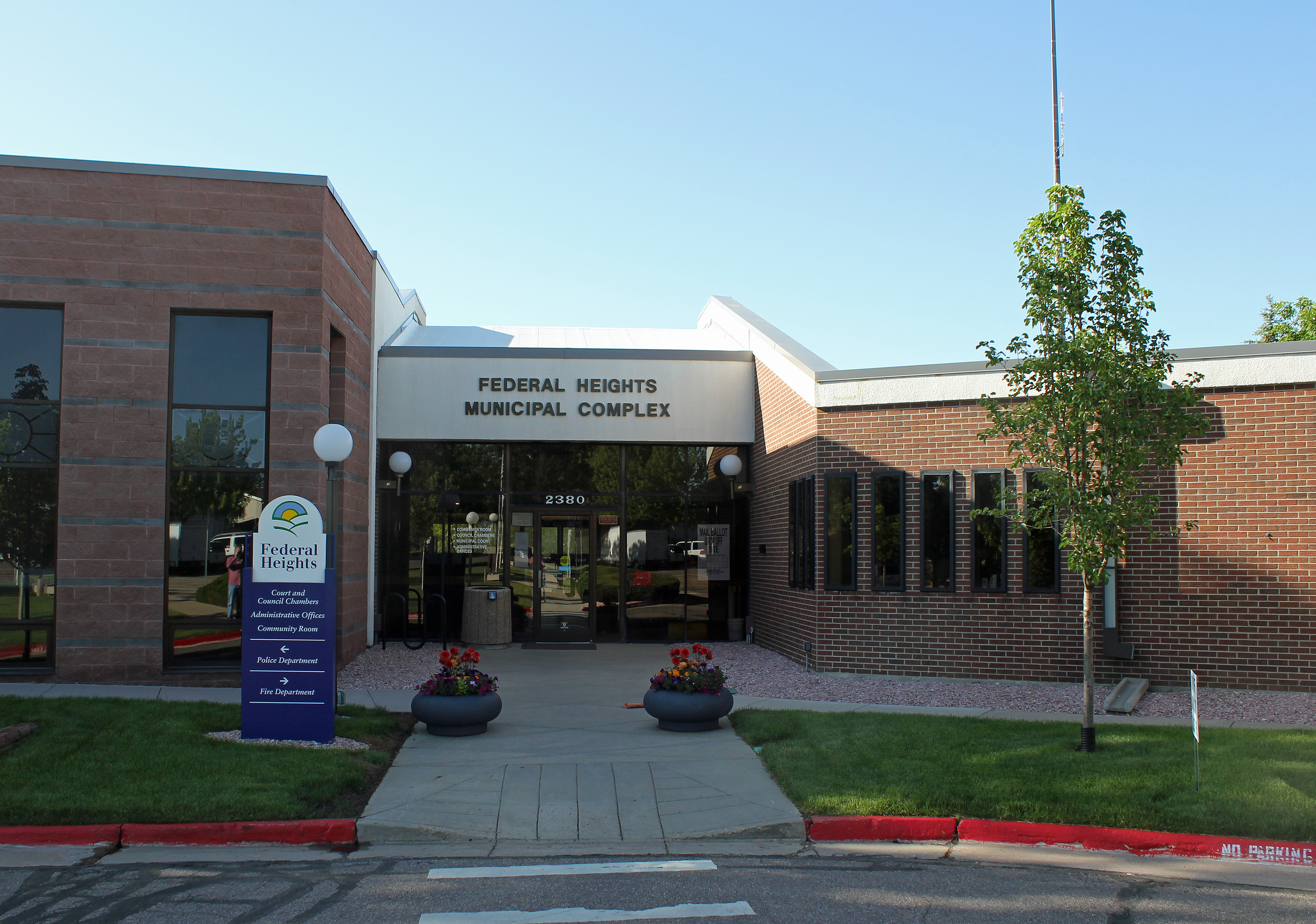
- Federal Heights Municipal Complex.

- Flag
- Motto: "Rising to Great Heights"
- Location of the City of Federal Heights in Adams County, Colorado
- Coordinates: 39°51′54″N 105°00′56″W
- Country: United States
- State: Colorado
- County: Adams
- Incorporated: June 6, 1940

Government
  - Type: home rule city
  - Mayor: Linda S. Montoya
  - Mayor Pro Tem: Doris Peterson

Area
  - Home rule city: 1.778 sq mi (4.604 km^{2})
  - Land: 1.776 sq mi (4.599 km^{2})
  - Water: 0.0019 sq mi (0.005 km^{2})
- Elevation: 5,302 ft (1,616 m)

Population (2020)
  - Home rule city: 14,382
  - Density: 8,099/sq mi (3,127/km^{2})
  - Metro: 2,963,821 (19th)
  - CSA: 3,623,560 (17th)
  - Front Range: 5,055,344
- Time zone: UTC−07:00 (MST)
  - Summer (DST): UTC−06:00 (MDT)
- ZIP codes: 80221, 80234, 80260
- Area codes: 303/720/983
- GNIS town ID: 2410493
- FIPS code: 08-26270
- Website: www.fedheights.org

The City of Federal Heights is a home rule city located in western Adams County, Colorado, United States. The city population was 14,382 at the 2020 United States census, a +25.42% increase since the 2010 United States census. Federal Heights is a part of the Denver-Aurora-Centennial, CO Metropolitan Statistical Area and the Front Range Urban Corridor. The current mayor is Linda S. Montoya, who was elected to a second four-year term in 2023.

== History ==
The Town of Federal Heights was incorporated on May 19, 1940. The community was named for its location on Federal Boulevard.

== Geography ==
Federal Heights is located in western Adams County.

At the 2020 United States census, the town had a total area of 1,138 acres (4.604 km^{2}) including 1.2 acres (0.005 km^{2}) of water.

== Demographics ==
Historical population
Census	Pop.	Note	%±
1950	173		—
1960	391		126.0%
1970	1,502		284.1%
1980	7,838		421.8%
1990	9,342		19.2%
2000	12,065		29.1%
2010	11,467		−5.0%
2020	14,382		25.4%
U.S. Decennial Census

=== 2020 census ===
As of the 2020 census, Federal Heights had a population of 14,382. The median age was 32.3 years. 27.3% of residents were under the age of 18 and 10.7% of residents were 65 years of age or older. For every 100 females there were 103.2 males, and for every 100 females age 18 and over there were 100.3 males age 18 and over.

100.0% of residents lived in urban areas, while 0.0% lived in rural areas.

There were 5,254 households in Federal Heights, of which 37.5% had children under the age of 18 living in them. Of all households, 35.7% were married-couple households, 25.7% were households with a male householder and no spouse or partner present, and 30.1% were households with a female householder and no spouse or partner present. About 26.8% of all households were made up of individuals and 10.0% had someone living alone who was 65 years of age or older.

There were 5,574 housing units, of which 5.7% were vacant. The homeowner vacancy rate was 1.5% and the rental vacancy rate was 9.5%.

Racial composition as of the 2020 census
Race	Number	Percent
White	5,990	41.6%
Black or African American	199	1.4%
American Indian and Alaska Native	264	1.8%
Asian	533	3.7%
Native Hawaiian and Other Pacific Islander	14	0.1%
Some other race	4,129	28.7%
Two or more races	3,253	22.6%
Hispanic or Latino (of any race)	8,874	61.7%

=== 2000 census ===
At the 2000 census there were 12,065 people, 5,125 households, and 3,023 families living in the city. The population density was 6,721.0 inhabitants per square mile (2,595.0/km^{2}). There were 5,311 housing units at an average density of 2,958.6 units per square mile (1,142.3 units/km^{2}). The racial makeup of the city was 80.03% White, 1.46% African American, 1.38% Native American, 6.09% Asian, 0.18% Pacific Islander, 7.80% from other races, and 3.06% from two or more races. Hispanic or Latino of any race were 22.62%.

Of the 5,125 households, 28.7% had children under the age of 18 living with them, 39.7% were married couples living together, 13.8% had a female householder with no husband present, and 41.0% were non-families. 31.4% of households were one person and 9.9% were one person aged 65 or older. The average household size was 2.35 and the average family size was 2.97.

The age distribution was 24.9% under the age of 18, 12.8% from 18 to 24, 31.6% from 25 to 44, 18.2% from 45 to 64, and 12.5% 65 or older. The median age was 31 years. For every 100 females, there were 95.0 males. For every 100 females age 18 and over, there were 91.4 males.

The median household income was $33,750 and the median family income was $38,468. Males had a median income of $31,054 versus $25,195 for females. The per capita income for the city was $16,801. About 9.2% of families and 11.2% of the population were below the poverty line, including 16.5% of those under age 18 and 3.7% of those age 65 or over.

== Attractions ==
Federal Heights is the home of a major family water park named Water World.

== See also ==
- Front Range Urban Corridor
