= Aqua Planet 63 =

Hanwha Aqua Planet 63
- Interactive map of Hanwha Aqua Planet 63
- 37°31′11.24″N 126°56′25.11″E
- Date opened: 1985
- Date closed: June 30, 2024
- Location: Yeouido, Seoul, South Korea
- Floor space: 5,630 m^{2} (60,600 sq ft)
- No. of animals: 20,000+
- No. of species: 400+
- Annual visitors: 1,000,000
- Management: Hanwha Group
- Website: 63 Seaworld Home

Hanwha Aqua Planet 63 (Korean: 아쿠아플라넷 63) was an aquarium that opened in 1985 in the 63 Building, Yeouido, Seoul, South Korea. It was the first public aquarium in the country. The 63 Building was the tallest building in Korea when it was built, and is still an iconic building in Seoul. The aquarium hosted about 1,000,000 visitors each year.

== History ==
The aquarium was opened in 1985, occupying 5,630 square metres (60,600 ft^{2}) of the three basement levels in the 63 Building (the third basement is an equipment level and not open to the public). Its mission was to "be a center of education for those interested in learning more about marine life," and it reproduced ocean habitats from around the world. The harbor seal show opened in 1990, and was showing daily. In 2016, Seaworld 63 was renovated and re-opened, and named as Aqua Planet 63. On June 24, 2024, Aqua Planet 63 permanently closed.

== Animals ==
Aqua Planet 63 was home to 20,000+ animals representing 400+ species, including king penguin, jackass penguin, pirarucu, piranha, Oriental small-clawed otter, harbor seal, and sea lion.

== Exhibits ==
The aquarium included 80 tanks, 54 of which are available for public viewing, with the rest being used for breeding rare sea creatures.

Migratory Tank

The track shape tank contained 200 m^{2} (2,200 sq ft) of water, and was home to migratory species that were constantly circling the tank. The tank was 2.1 metres (6 ft 11 in) high and 42 metres (138 ft) around, and was made with 11-centimetre (4.3 in) thick acrylic.

== Shows ==
Harbor seal

There were four harbor seals and two of them were playing a show four times a day. Quite similar to the sea lion show from many other aquariums.

Sea lion

A South American sea lion and a California sea lion were playing shows three times a day. The show was like a musical where most of the performance is done by trainers.

== See also ==
- Aqua Planet (aquarium)
- Aqua Planet Jeju
- Hanwha Group
