= Water World, Colorado =

Water park in Federal Heights, Colorado

Water World
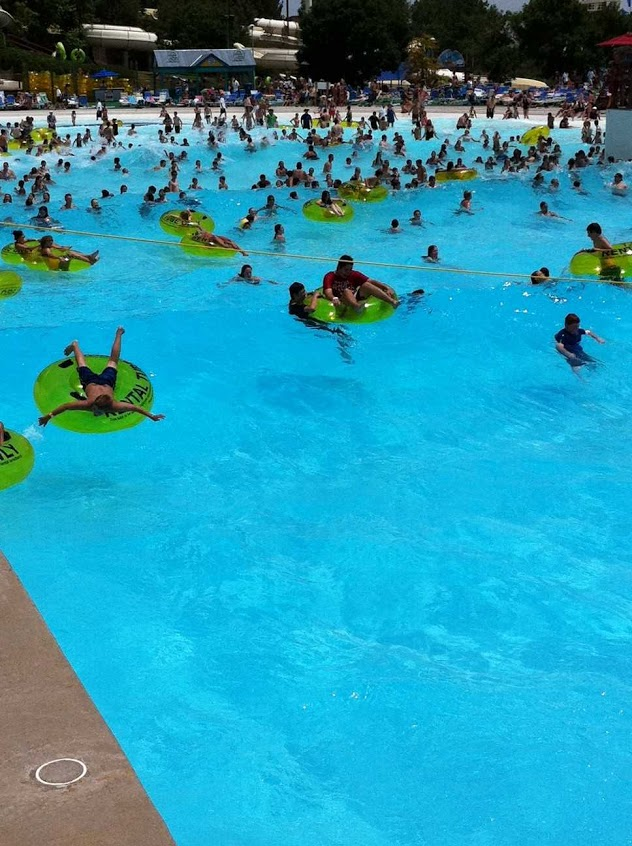
- Thunder Bay wave pool
- Interactive map of Water World
- Slogan: Summer's Best Memories
- Location: Federal Heights, Colorado, United States
- Coordinates: 39°51′25.13″N 105°0′38.95″W
- Owner: Hyland Hills Park and Recreation District
- Opened: 1979
- Operating season: Summer (Memorial Day weekend through Labor Day)
- Area: 70 acres (28 ha)
- Water slides: 31 water slides
- Website: http://www.waterworldcolorado.com/

Water World (also known as Hyland Hills Water World or Water World Colorado) is a water park that is owned and operated by the Hyland Hills Park and Recreation District and located in Federal Heights, Colorado, roughly 10 miles (16 km) north of downtown Denver, Colorado. The park first opened in August 1979 with the first two waterslides in the state of Colorado, the Bonzai Pipeline. Water World is open from Memorial Day through Labor Day, weather permitting.

The park occupies 70 acres (28 ha), making it one of America's largest water theme parks. In 2021, Amusement Today awarded Water World as the 5th best water park in the industry on their Golden Ticket Awards. As of the 2025 season, the park has 50 attractions including a multitude of water slides, a lazy river, inflatable tube rides, multi-guest inflatable raft rides, two wave pools, and a gondola, which offers access to and from the top of the park.

== Water attractions ==
The park has several unique water attractions.

Water World's most famous attraction is Voyage to the Center of the Earth, which opened in 1993 and received the Innovation Award from the World Waterpark Association. Riders ride in small circular multi-passenger inflatable rafts and travel through an artificial cavern. It is themed to a newly discovered cave that reportedly has creatures from the prehistoric era still inhabiting it. It includes steep downward spirals, sudden drop offs, and various dinosaurs, including an animatronic Tyrannosaurus encounter at the end of the ride. The ride is unusual for a water park attraction in its thematic emphasis, and in that it can take in excess of 5 minutes to complete, making it one of the longest rides at any water park. Since then, the ride has had three cosmetic upgrades, the most recent in the 2025 season. The Ride has a throughput capacity of over 1,000 guests per hour.

Water World has three wave pools: Turtle Bay, a very small wave pool for toddlers; Cowabunga Beach, a small wave pool; and Thunder Bay, a large pool which holds 1,100,000 US gallons (4,200,000 L; 920,000 imp gal) of water. Thunder Bay features a large Pepsi advertisement on the pool floor. Thunder Bay also sports a new engine that generates multiple wave types. The only wave cycle available for guests simulates medium ocean waves creating crashing waves and strong currents in certain areas of the pool. Thunder Bay has a maximum depth of 8 feet (2.4 m), Cowabunga Beach has a maximum depth of about 5 feet (1.5 m), and Turtle Bay has a maximum depth of 3 feet (0.91 m). Both have multiple points of emergency shut-offs used to immediately cut engine power from the wave rooms for added guest safety.

Other notable attractions include Glacier Run, an 8-lane head first mat slide with several steep drops; The Revolution, a 4-person cloverleaf tube ride that leads down into a tube bowl; Storm, a 4-person tube dark slide; and Sunset Racer, a racing slide that features eight side by side lanes and a timed open air finish.

In 1993, Water World installed The Fun House Express (now Alpine Springs Express) gondola connecting the lower and upper parts of the park. The fixed grip gondola, manufactured by Yan, was relocated to Water World from Circus Circus in Las Vegas, where it was lightly used. In 2021, Water World repainted and rethemed the gondola cars and terminal as part of the Alpine Springs renovation.

In 2012, Water World announced the Mile High Flyer, a hydro-magnetic water coaster which launches riders up and down five unique hills taking only 45 seconds to complete.

In 2017, Water World changed the former Captain Jack's wave pool into a smaller wave pool - Cowabunga Beach. This made room for Turtle Bay Kids Wave Pool directly next to Cowabunga Beach. Cowabunga Beach now acts as a Boogieboarding attraction during most hours through the day, but is open to as a play pool typically between 11:30 AM to 1:30 PM.

In 2021, Water World renovated the Big Top area to a re-imagined and Colorado-themed Alpine Springs area. The area features Colorado landmarks throughout the entire area and includes the water coasters Mile High Flyer, a ProSlide HydroMagnetic Rocket and Roaring Forks, a ProSlide Dueling RocketBlast with FlyingSaucer elements, as well as the tube bowl ride Centennial Basin, a CannonBowl 40, tube ride Foothills Falls, mat slide Sunset Racer, body slides Peaks Speed Slides, and a family area that includes a children's pool, lazy river, and slides.

In 2025, Water World announced that they'll be retiring Calypso Cove and all of its attractions in order to make way for new attractions opening in 2026. The Calypso Cove attractions were built in the early 1980s and included the Screamin' Mimi, a ride where guests ride board-type vehicles down a roller coaster like track, reaching speeds of 30 miles per hour (48 km/h) before landing in a pool and bouncing across the water.

In 2026, Water World opened Summit Canyon, an outdoors adventure-themed area that features a kids' play pool with slides and spray features named Critter Cove, an over-water obstacle course and leisure pool called Creekside Crossing and Emerald Lake, respectively, an additional pool with three in-water basketball hoops dubbed Puddle Dunker, two new body slides and two new tube rides, including Colorado's first HIVE waterslide, called Marmot Mayhem, a Proslide SwitchBACK, named Runoff Rapids, a TurboTWISTER speed slide called Columbine Cascade, and Denver's first drop-capsule ride, named Aspen Falls. Summit Canyon opened to the public on July 16th, 2026, though the area had been experienced through preview soft-openings in the days beforehand.

== Special events ==
Water World has hosted an Annual Belly Flop Competition since 1996 and an Annual Bow Wow Beach Doggie Day, in which dogs can swim and play in the park after it closes to humans for the season. A portion of Doggie Day ticket sales are donated to the Adams County Riverdale Animal Shelter.

Water World has also been a host location for the World's Largest Swimming Lesson (WLSL), organized by the World Waterpark Association, since its inception in 2010.

== Awards ==
- 1993 World Waterpark Association Innovation Award for Voyage to the Center of the Earth
- 2008 Travel Channel list of the top 10 water parks in the United States.
- 2013 USA Today readers voted Water World one of the top 10 water parks in America.
- 2021 Golden Ticket Award for being one of the best water parks in the industry. The awards are handed out based on surveys given to experienced and well-traveled amusement and water park enthusiasts from around the world.
- 2024 Newsweek readers voted Water World #2 Best Outdoor Water Park in America
- 2025 USA Today readers voted Water World #2 Best Outdoor Water Park in America. Mile High Flyer was ranked #3 Best Water Coaster, Voyage to the Center of the Earth was voted #3 Best Water Slide, and the Lazy River was voted #5 Best Lazy River.
- 2026 World Waterpark Association Leading Edge Award for Summit Canyon

== Certified Autism Center ==
Water World was certified as a Certified Autism Center in 2020 by the International Board of Credentialing and Continuing Education Standards. For more than 20 years, this board has been a leader in cognitive disorder training and certification, serving various sectors globally. Their programs are known for integrating evidence-based content with the perspectives of autistic individuals, and they offer various resources, ongoing support, and renewal requirements to promote continuous learning and long-term impact.

Water World's certification requires specialized training focused on enhancing communication and engagement with guests who have sensory needs and their families. The park also provides sensory guides to help guests plan their visits and a sensory room, which offers a quiet place in the park for anyone who is experiencing sensory overload or needs a calm place to relax and recharge.

== Food and beverage ==
Water World offers several food and beverage locations throughout the park. Many serve boardwalk favorites including hamburgers, pizza, chicken fingers, and french fries, though Water World also offers Bayside Barbeque and Walliver's Burrito Co. Certain locations offer alcohol beverages including frozen cocktails and draft beer. Dippin' Dots are also available.

Water World is known for its Colossus Funnel Cake, which offers soft serve ice cream between two funnel cakes topped with whipped cream and choice of toppings.

The park also permits guests to bring in their own food.

== Attendance ==
Water World's annual attendance figures are published by the Hyland Hills Park and Recreation District in their Annual Financial Reports. The park's attendance was impacted significantly by the COVID-19 pandemic, resulting in a full closure for the 2020 season.

Water World has hosted over 15 million visitors since opening in 1979.

Water World Annual Attendance (2011–2024)
Year	Attendance	Ref.
2011	559,377	
2012	537,824	
2013	494,458	
2014	459,691	
2015	443,816	
2016	434,024	
2017	388,843	
2018	405,807	
2019	375,222	
2020	Closed (Note: The facility was closed for the entire 2020 season due to the COVID-19 pandemic.)	
2021	394,919	
2022	407,626	
2023	382,931	
2024	456,378	

== Former attractions ==
- Space Bowls – two body bowls that were removed to make way for Roaring Forks.
- Captain Jack's Wave Pool – replaced by Cowabunga Beach and Turtle Bay
- White Lightning – replaced by Glacier Run
- Tandemonium – replaced by Warp Speed
- Fun H2ouse – circus fun house attraction that was renovated into Centennial Basin, and Roaring Forks.
- Tortuga run – Slow tubing trail renovated into Summit Canyon.
- Screaming Mimi – Cart ride into water renovated into Summit Canyon.
- Wally World – Children's play area renovated into Summit Canyon.

== Pop culture reference ==
Water World was an inspiration for the South Park episode "Pee", which features a water park named Pi Pi's Splashtown. Many of the water parks rides appeared in the episode under slightly different names, including its most notable attraction Voyage to the Center of the Earth (retitled "Journey to the Center of the Earth").

The park was also featured in the 2006 film The Surfer King.

== Technology ==
Water World offers visitors a cashless payment option via RFID wristbands that can be preloaded with money at any POS terminal in the park. Season Passes (Splash Passes) can be upgraded to include a preloaded RFID cashless payment option. Water World also offers lockers that can be accessed via RFID wristbands. The wristbands are dispensed via a self-service kiosk located in Water World's locker rental area. Unlike traditional single use lockers, the RFID wristbands allow users to access the locker multiple times throughout the day.

== 2009 accident ==
Water World accident
- Date: July 21, 2009
- Type: Drowning
- Deaths: 1
- Injuries: 0

In 2009, a lifeguard pulled a 48-year-old man from Captain Jack's Wave Pool (now Cowabunga Beach). Paramedics were unable to revive him. He was transported to the hospital and pronounced dead, with preliminary reports identifying drowning as the cause of death. This marked the first fatality in the park's history.

== 2026 incident ==
On July 11, 2026 at around noon, a bomb threat was made to the park. Employees and park officials recalled hearing a "robotic voice" over the phone alluding that a bomb had been planted somewhere in the park. This forced the evacuation of all guests, which had reached the many thousands that day. Luckily, the threat was found to be not credible, but still warranted a full police search of the park.
