= Aqua Planet (aquarium) =

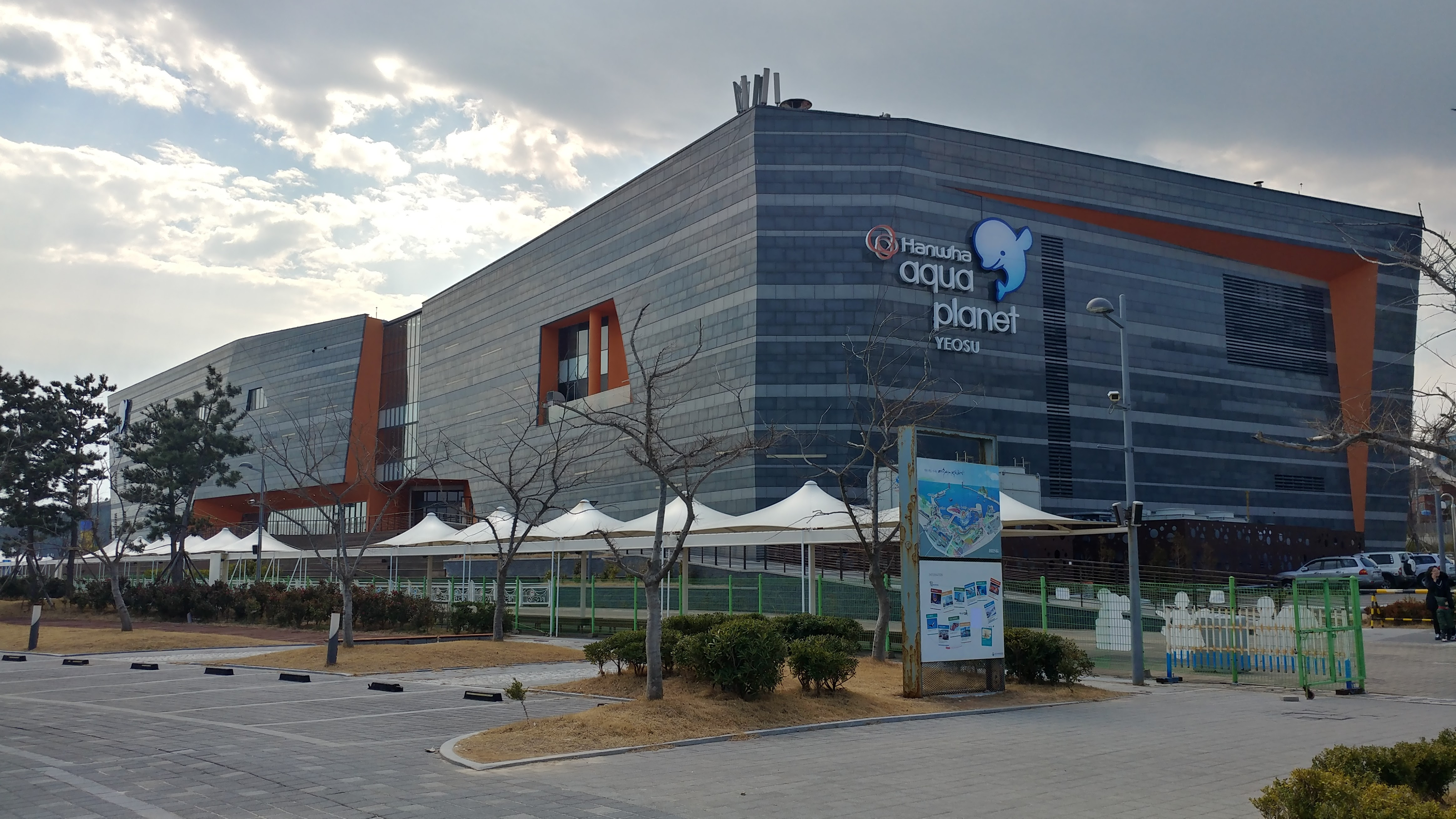
- Aqua Planet Yeosu
- Location: In South Korea with locations in Seoul, Yeosu, Seogwipo, Goyang, Suwon
- Owner: Hanwha Hotels & Resorts (Hanwha Group)
- Management: Hanwha Group
- Website: aquaplanet.co.kr

Aqua Planet is a chain of public aquariums in South Korea. Aqua Planet Jeju is so far South Korea's largest aquarium.

== Branches ==
Name	Location
Aqua Planet 63	Yeouido, Yeongdeungpo District, Seoul
Aqua Planet Yeosu	Yeosu, South Jeolla Province
Aqua Planet Jeju	Seongsan-eup, Seogwipo, Jeju Province
Aqua Planet Ilsan	Ilsanseo-gu, Goyang, Gyeonggi Province
Aqua Planet Gwanggyo	Yeongtong-gu, Suwon, Gyeonggi Province
