= Marine World =

Marine World may refer to:

- Six Flags Discovery Kingdom, formerly "Marine World", in Vallejo, California
  - Marine World/Africa USA, formerly "Marine World", in Redwood Shores, California, before relocating to Vallejo
- uShaka Marine World, Durban, South Africa
- Marine World Uminonakamichi, an aquarium in Fukuoka, Japan
- Wildlife Park 2: Marine World, a 2007 expansion pack for the video game Wildlife Park 2

== See also ==
- Marineland (disambiguation)
- Sea World (disambiguation)
- Water World (disambiguation)
- Water planet (disambiguation)
