= TurkuaZoo =

- Interactive map of TurkuaZoo
- 41.0455533°N 28.8963175°E
- Date opened: 2009
- Location: Bayrampaşa, Istanbul, Turkey
- Land area: 55,000 m^{2} (590,000 sq ft)
- No. of animals: 10,000
- Volume of largest tank: 5,000 cubic metres (1,300,000 US gal)
- Total volume of tanks: 7,000 cubic metres (1,800,000 US gal)
- Website: https://www.visitsealife.com/istanbul/en

The TurkuaZoo also called Sealife is a public aquarium located in Bayrampaşa in Istanbul, Turkey. It was the first public aquarium in Turkey, and is one of the largest aquariums in Europe. In addition to being a major tourist attraction for Istanbul, the aquarium is a centre for marine research and conservation.
