= Waterland (disambiguation) =

Waterland is a municipality in the Netherlands.

Waterland may also refer to:

- Waterland (novel), a novel by Graham Swift
- Waterland (film), a 1992 film starring Jeremy Irons
- Daniel Waterland (1683–1740), English theologian

== See also ==
- Land and Water Conservation Fund
- Land and Water
