= MerPeople =

2023 documentary miniseries

- Promotional poster
- Directed by: Cynthia Wade
- Starring: Morgana Alba; Mermaid Sparkles; Eric Ducharme; The Blixunami
- Opening theme: "Black Sea" by Natasha Blume
- Composer: Adam Crystal
- Country of origin: United States
- Original language: English
- No. of episodes: 4

Production
- Executive producers: Michael Williams; Joel Chiodi; David Collins; Rob Eric; Andréanna Seymore; Roland Ballester; Cynthia Wade
- Producer: Angela Almeida
- Cinematography: Boaz Freund
- Editors: Gary Pollack; Eric Daniel Matzgar; Sasha Friedlander; Sinéad Kinnane; Sloane Klevin
- Running time: 41–48 minutes
- Production companies: Scout Productions; Netflix

Original release
- Release: May 23, 2023

MerPeople is a documentary miniseries that premiered May 23, 2023, on Netflix. It explores the subculture and performing art of "mermaiding".

== Cast ==
- Morgana Alba, a mermaid performer and the founder of Circus Siren Pod
- Mermaid Sparkles, an aspiring mermaid performer living in Little Rock, Arkansas
- Eric Ducharme, "The Mertailor", maker of mer-tails, owner of Mertailor's Mermaid Aquarium Encounter, and a former Weeki Wachee merman
- Chè Monique, a plus size mermaid influencer who advocates for body positivity, and the founder of the Society of Fat Mermaids
- Tristan the Red River Merman, a recovering addict and aspiring merman
- The Blixunami, a non-binary merperson and musician
- Barbara Wynns, a former Weeki Wachee mermaid
- Siren Carrie Wata, a mermaid who holds the Afro Mermaid Summit in Miami, Florida
- Mermaid Kariel, a mermaid performer and maker of mer-tails
- Hannah Mermaid, a famous mermaid performer and model
- Mermaid Pixi: mermaid performer living in Little Rock, Arkansas

== Episodes ==
| No. | Title | Directed by | Original release date |
|---|---|---|---|
| 1 | "No Dead Mermaids" | Cynthia Wade | May 23, 2023 |
Performing as a merperson is physically demanding, expensive, and few make a living by "mermaiding". The history of the mermaid shows at Weeki Wachee Springs, Florida is touched upon, and former Weeki Wachee mermaids recall their experiences. Mermaid Sparkles faces career challenges due to her living in Arkansas. Both Sparkles and Chè Monique, a plus-size mermaid, aspire to join The Circus Siren Pod, "an elite mermaid performance troop." The Pod holds auditions and founder Morgana Alba's safety motto is "No dead mermaids." Eric "The Mertailor" Ducharme plans to open his own live mermaid show and aquarium. Sparkles, Chè Monique, and Tristan the Red River Merman audition for Eric's show.
| 2 | "Pick Your Tail, Sweetie" | Cynthia Wade | May 23, 2023 |
Sparkles doesn't get hired by Mertailor's Mermaid Aquarium Encounter. Tristan is offered a position, but must work his way up before performing. The Blixunami lives life unapologetically after having grown up in a very religious household. The Circus Siren Pod's mermaids perform at a renaissance fair, and later talk about being sexually harassed by mainly adult, male audience members. The Mertailor Aquarium opens to audiences. Veteran mermaid Barbara Wynns coaches Tristan. At MerMagic Con, Sparkles performs and impresses Morgana. She is asked to be a guest performer with the Pod in Las Vegas.
| 3 | "Fly Free, Little Fishy" | Cynthia Wade | May 23, 2023 |
The Circus Siren Pod arrives in Las Vegas to perform. The King and Queen of the Seas competition on the Virgin Voyages Mermaiden cruise ship is announced. Tristan relapses on drugs, but regains sobriety with support from his mer-circle. Blix is forced to couch surf, and eventually travels to the Afro Mermaid Summit, hosted by Carrie Wata. Eric holds a Halloween show at the Mertailor Aquarium. Chè commissions a custom-made, plus-size, silicone tail. She is also invited to be a judge at the Mermaiden competition. Sparkles overcomes her nervousness to swim in a cold-water tank with the Pod. However, she begins showing signs of hypothermia.
| 4 | "Fin for the Win" | Cynthia Wade | May 23, 2023 |
Sparkles becomes hypothermic, but quickly recovers once treated. A group of elderly Weeki Wachee mermaids want to reunite for the 75th Anniversary of Weeki Wachee Springs. When the gathering is postponed for no clear reason, they instead hold the reunion at the Mertailor Aquarium. In Miami, the Mermaiden cruise begins. Sparkles, Blix, Chè, and Carrie all attend. In the pageant, the merpeople show off their "mersonas" and skills. Sparkles doesn't make the top 12, but Blix and Sparkles' best friend, Pixi, advance. The winner is decided with an underwater photoshoot. Mermaid Luna of Florida wins Queen of the Seas, while Merman Andy of California wins King of the Seas and the grand prize. Blix receives the congeniality award. Sparkles joins the Circus Siren Pod. Eric ruminates on how the myth of mermaids is important for people's sense of wonder.

== Reception ==
MerPeople has received mostly positive reviews from critics. As of June 2023, has a 100% fresh rating on Rotten Tomatoes based on 8 reviews. On Metacritic it holds a score of 68, indicating "generally favorable reviews".

Joel Keller of Decider recommended streaming the miniseries, noting that the show had "magic and whimsy" with "doses of reality". However, CNN's Brian Lowry felt "there's just not enough here to merit making MerPeople part of your world." Lucy Mangan of The Guardian gave the show three out of five stars, and noted the docuseries possibly caught the mermaid industry in a "transitional point" before its "full commodification and corporatisation".
