= Manila Ocean Park =

Oceanarium in Manila, Philippines

- Logo

- Oceanarium building alongside the Quirino Grandstand

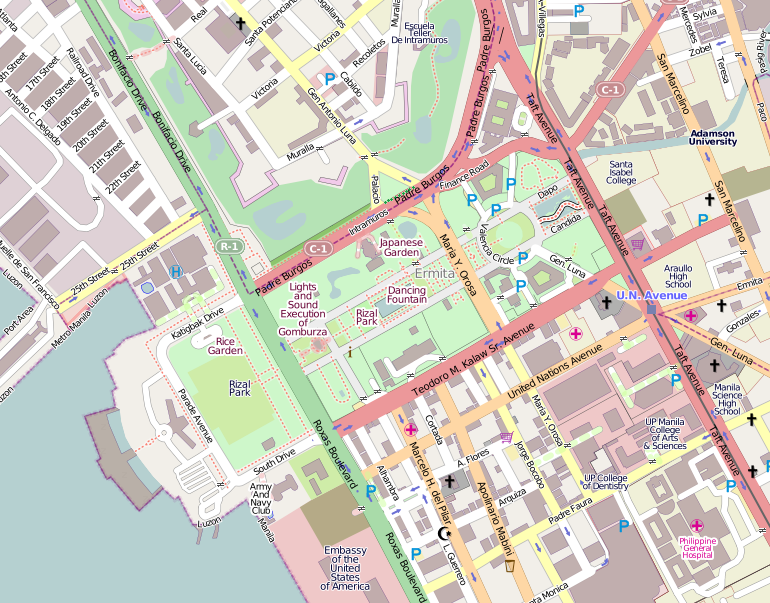
- Location within Rizal Park Location within Manila Location within Philippines

General information
- Status: Completed
- Location: Rizal Park, Ermita, Manila, Philippines
- Coordinates: 14°34′46″N 120°58′24″E
- Opened: March 1, 2008; 18 years ago
- Owner: China Oceanis Philippines

Design and construction
- Main contractor: E.R. Hitosis and Associates

Website
- www.manilaoceanpark.com

The Manila Ocean Park, is an oceanarium in Manila, Philippines. It is owned by China Oceanis Philippines Inc., a subsidiary of China Oceanis Inc., a Singaporean-registered firm. It is located behind the Quirino Grandstand at Rizal Park.

== Construction ==
The construction involved erecting structural pillars at the beachfront and constructing the platform that would serve as the foundation of the entire building. The base structure and platform was completed and for a while served a secondary purpose as a promenade walkway until construction of the actual park continued.

In April 2007, the Manila Ocean Park started construction. It was initially set to open on December 15, 2007 but the opening date was then moved to February 24, 2008. The facility opened on March 1, 2008.

E.R. Hitosis and Associates was involved in the construction management of the Manila Ocean Park.

== Features ==
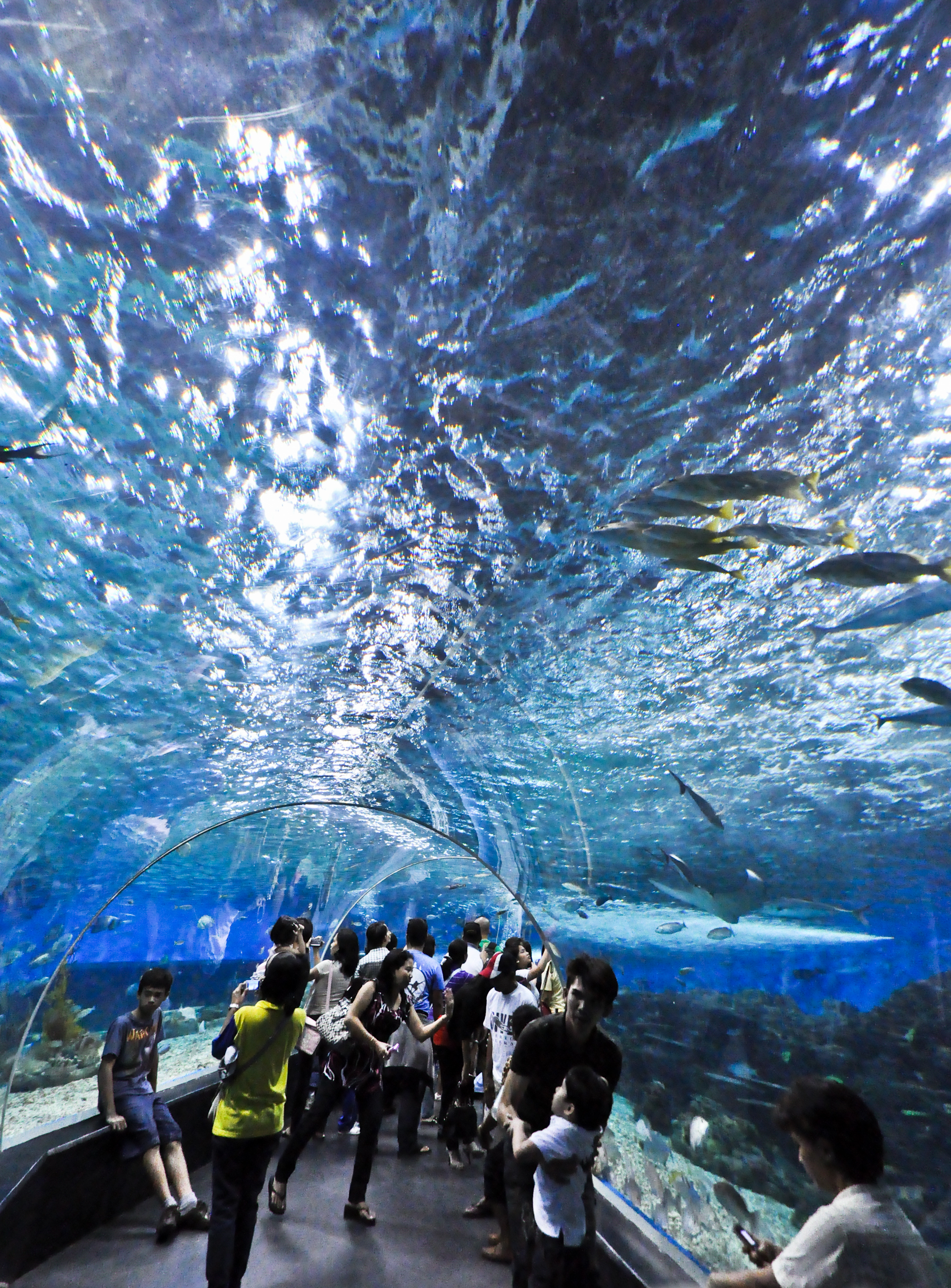
Tunnel of the Manila Ocean Park's Oceanarium

The main attraction of Manila Ocean Park is the Oceanarium which houses 14,000 sea creatures from about 277 species all of which is indigenous in Southeast Asia. The Oceanarium has seven sections and contains 3,000 cubic meters (110,000 cu ft) of sea water. Its main feature is the 25-meter (82 ft) 220° curved walkway tunnel after a 55-meter (180 ft) walkthrough inside the Oceanarium. The water used in the Oceanarium is derived from Manila Bay, which is filtered to be suitable to marine life. It also has an educational activity area, function rooms for events, and shark and stingray viewing area situated in two levels. The Jellies Exhibit, a separate attraction hosts jellyfishes. The Back of the House features information on the operation of the facility itself.

The Manila Ocean Park also hosts the Trails to Antarctica, the first penguin park facility in the country, which features Humboldt penguins. Through the years, their breeding program for the penguins have been very successful. As of May 2017, they already have a total of 13 baby penguins that hatched inside the park. They also have the Birds of Prey Kingdom which features Brahminy kites and the World of Creepy Crawlies which exhibits frogs, insects, spiders, and worms.

Services were also offered to patrons such as the Mermaid Swim Experience where visitors are taught to swim while wearing a costume mermaid tail, Underwater diving, Fish Spa, and rides on a boat with a glass bottom. Shows such as the Sea Lion Show and All Star Bird Show is performed inside the Manila Ocean Park and seats up to 1,900 pax per show. As part of their banner CSR program called "I Love My Ocean Planet", the show brings valuable information on environmental conservation and close interaction with the birds and sea lions. The Symphony is a performance involving fountains that shoots water 40 meters (130 ft) high supplemented with multimedia effects is also among the attractions of the Manila Ocean Park.

The Manila Ocean Park also features its latest addition, a water park called Ocean Park Aqua Adventure.

Red lionfish

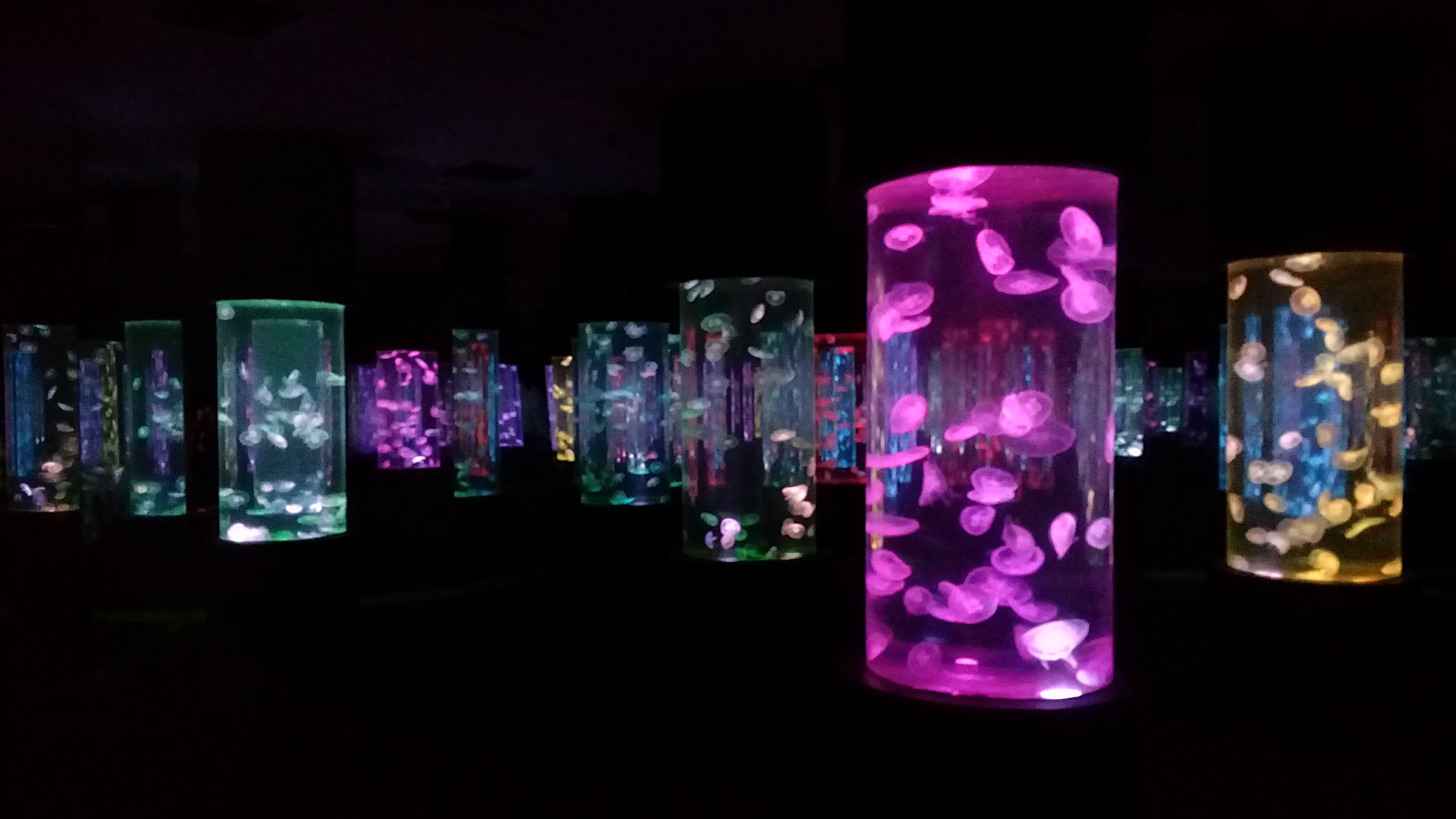
Jellyfish

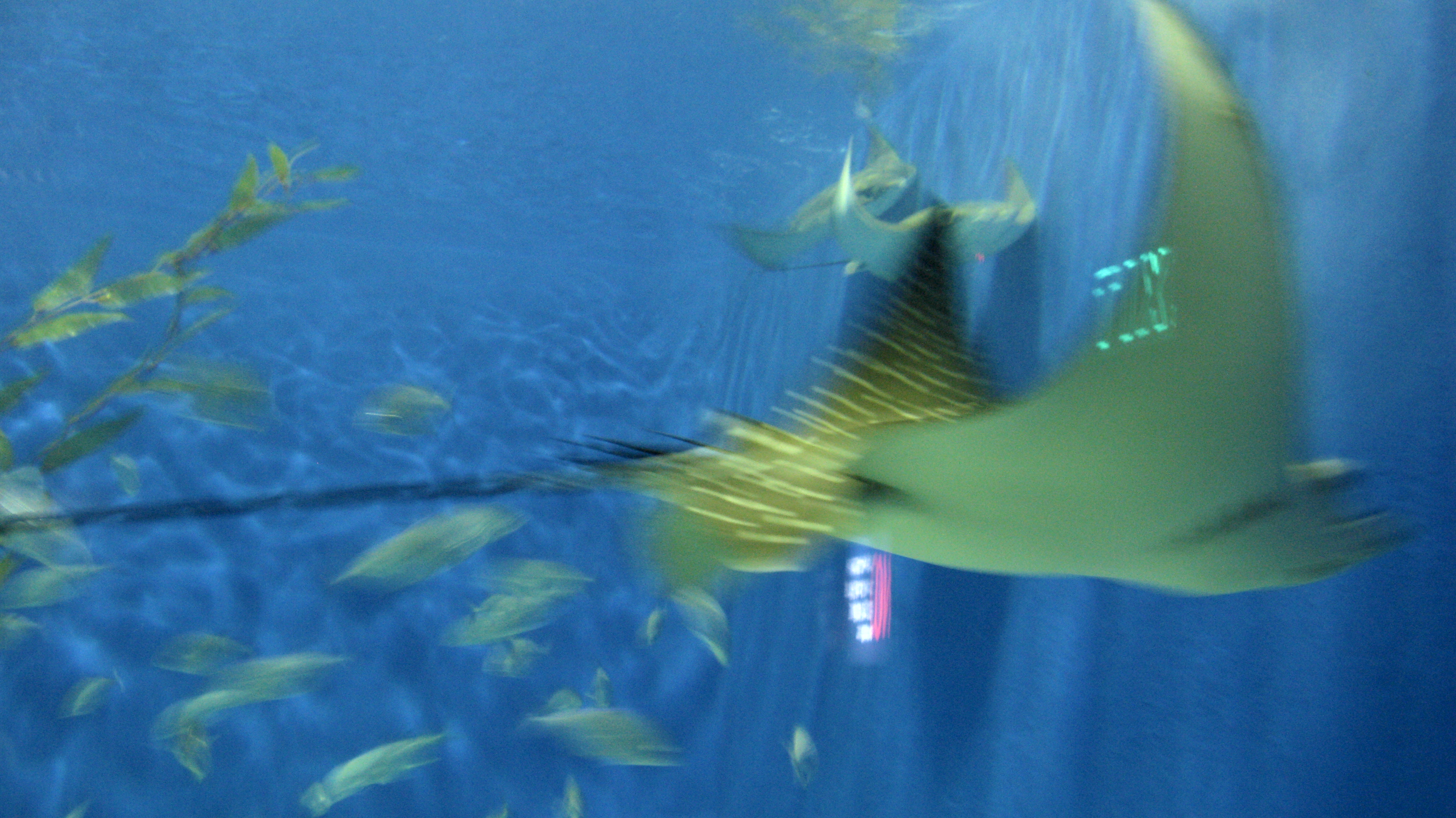
Rays

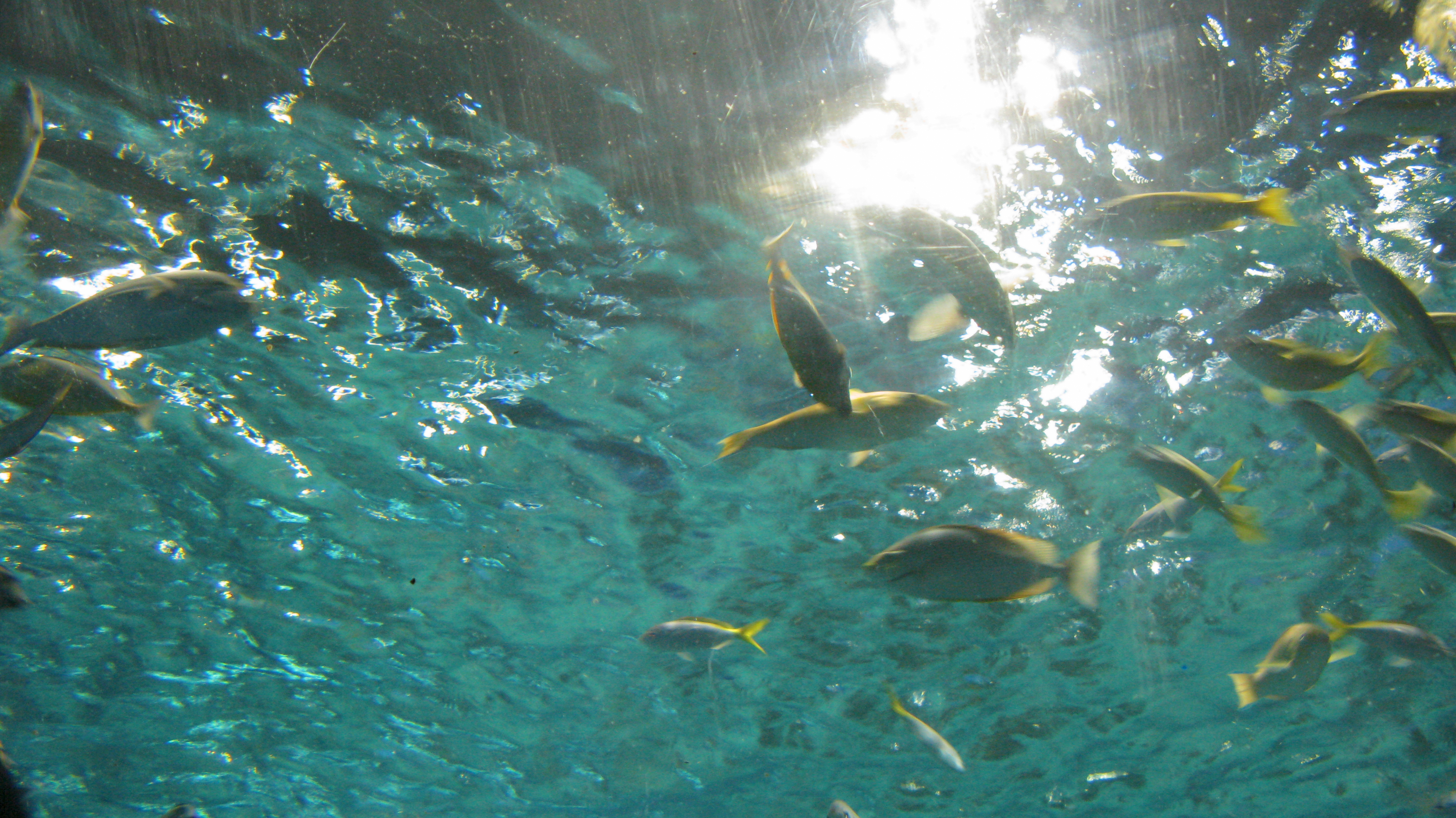
Fish

== Hotel ==
Hotel H2O.

The Manila Ocean Park hosts a hotel on top of the Oceanarium dubbed as Hotel H2O. The hotel itself has a dedicated fitness center and spa and meeting rooms. The Makansutra Asian Food Village hosts dining outlets for its patrons. Hotel H2O also hosts areas for events which covers a total area of 3,500 square meters (38,000 sq ft) and has a total capacity of 1,000 people.

== See also ==
- Cebu Ocean Park
- Ocean Adventure
- On Tatay's Boat
