= Eric Milligan =

Eric Milligan may refer to:

- Eric Milligan (politician)
- Eric Milligan (rugby union)
- The Blixunami (real name Eric Milligan), professional mermaid

== See also ==
- Eric Millegan, American actor
