= Mermaiding =

Swimming dressed in a mermaid costume

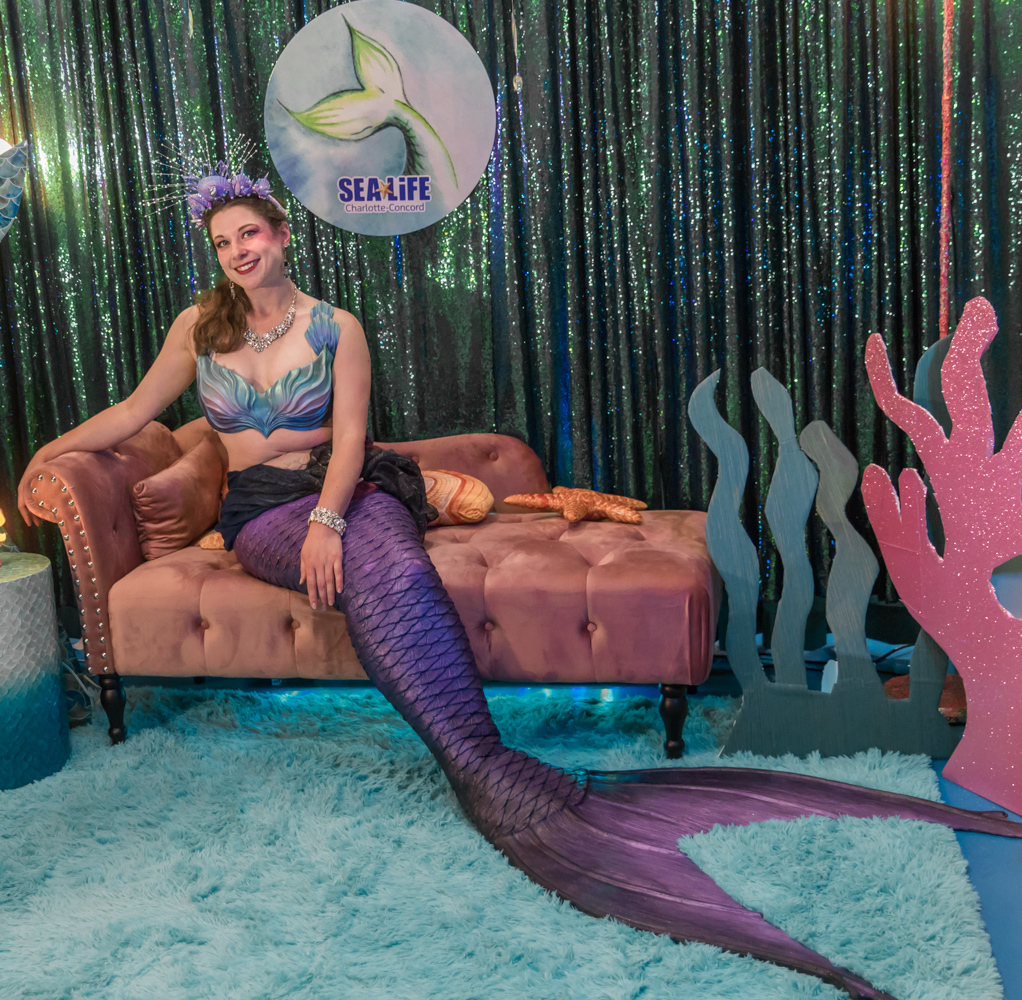
A professional mermaid dressed for a meet and greet at the Sea Life Charlotte-Concord aquarium in 2023

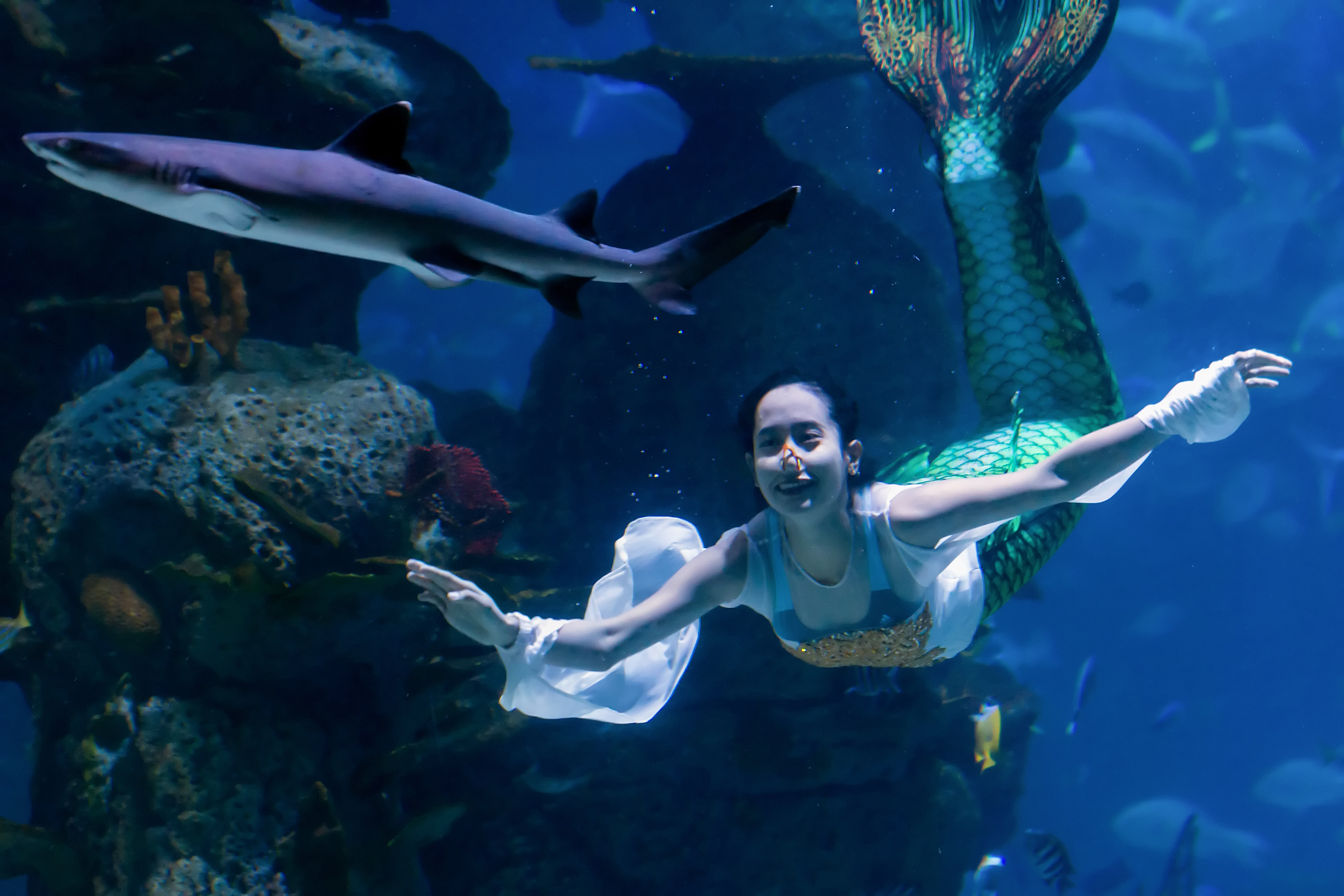
A mermaid performance in Jakarta, Indonesia in 2018

Mermaiding (also referred to as artistic mermaiding, mermaidry, or artistic mermaid performance) is the practice of wearing, and often swimming in, a costume mermaid tail.

Mermaiding is both a profession and a hobby. Professional mermaids will often swim in live, filmed, or photographed productions or shows and can be hired for special events. Within the community, mermaid or merfolk can be shortened to "mer". Nonprofessional enthusiasts may swim in tails at their local pools if the pool allows it, as well as lakes, rivers, and seashores, or take part in mermaid-themed photo shoots, birthday parties, or mermaid meetings with other Mers. Mermaiding is popular with all ages and genders. Practitioners are sometimes called mermaids, professional mermaids, or occasionally, water ballerinas. Mermaiding is often seen as a form of extreme cosplay due to the nature of crafting the tails and other prosthetics used by practitioners. There are several tail-making companies supplying the community with everything from fabric tails to full special effects (SFX) prostheses costing thousands of dollars.

== History ==
In the beginning of the twentieth century, mermaiding was sometimes referred to as water ballet, but it is not currently a term that is commonly used. Mermaiding should not be confused with modern synchronized swimming, although there can be some overlap if a mermaid performance troupe is performing a synchronized routine.

It is difficult to determine exactly where the term "mermaiding" was coined; but some of the first professional freelance mermaids appeared on the world scene around 2004. Mermaiding became more popular over time through performances at celebrity events and features in popular media.

=== Esther Williams ===
Esther Jane Williams (8 August 1921 – 6 June 2013) was an American competitive swimmer and actress. Williams set multiple national and regional swimming records in her late teens as part of the Los Angeles Athletic Club swim team. Unable to compete in the 1940 Summer Olympics because of the outbreak of World War II, she joined Billy Rose's Aquacade, where she took on the role vacated by Eleanor Holm after the show's move from New York City to San Francisco. While in the city, she spent five months swimming alongside Olympic gold medal winner and Tarzan star, Johnny Weissmuller. Williams caught the attention of MGM scouts at the Aquacade. After appearing in several small roles, alongside Mickey Rooney in an Andy Hardy film, and future five-time co-star Van Johnson in A Guy Named Joe, Williams made a series of films in the 1940s and early 1950s known as "aquamusicals", which featured elaborate performances with synchronized swimming and diving. In 1952, Williams appeared in her only biographical role, as Australian swimming star Annette Kellerman in Million Dollar Mermaid, which went on to become her nickname while at MGM. Williams left MGM in 1956 and appeared in a handful of unsuccessful feature films, followed by several extremely popular water-themed television specials, including one from Cypress Gardens, Florida.

=== Weeki Wachee Mermaids ===
Located an hour north of Tampa on Florida's Gulf Coast, Weeki Wachee Springs has hosted a mermaid show since 1947. Swimmers, trained by Newton Perry, performed synchronised ballet in the natural springs at the site. The resort was purchased and promoted by the American Broadcasting Co. (ABC) in 1959. In 2008, Weeki Wachee Springs was incorporated into the State of Florida Park system.

=== In media ===
In May 2023, Netflix released a documentary series titled MerPeople, which depicted the experiences of mermaids in the United States, some historically prominent and some still gaining traction in the community. The series mostly focused on the Mertailor, the Blixunami, Mermaid Sparkles, Morgana Alba, Chè Monique, and the Red River Merman. The miniseries covered the mermaids' personal lives, careers as performers, and participation in Virgin Voyages' King and Queen of the Sea pageant.

== Professional mermaids ==
Mermaid Linden, Hannah Mermaid, Grace Page (aka Mermaid Grace), Katrin Gray (aka Mermaid Kat), Elle Jimenez (aka Mermaid Elle) and Medusirena (aka Medusirena Marina) are six of the most successful mermaid performers in the world. Today, many mermaid performers work at aquariums, casinos, or tourist attractions professionally. Some freedivers wear mermaid tails to add novelty to the sport.

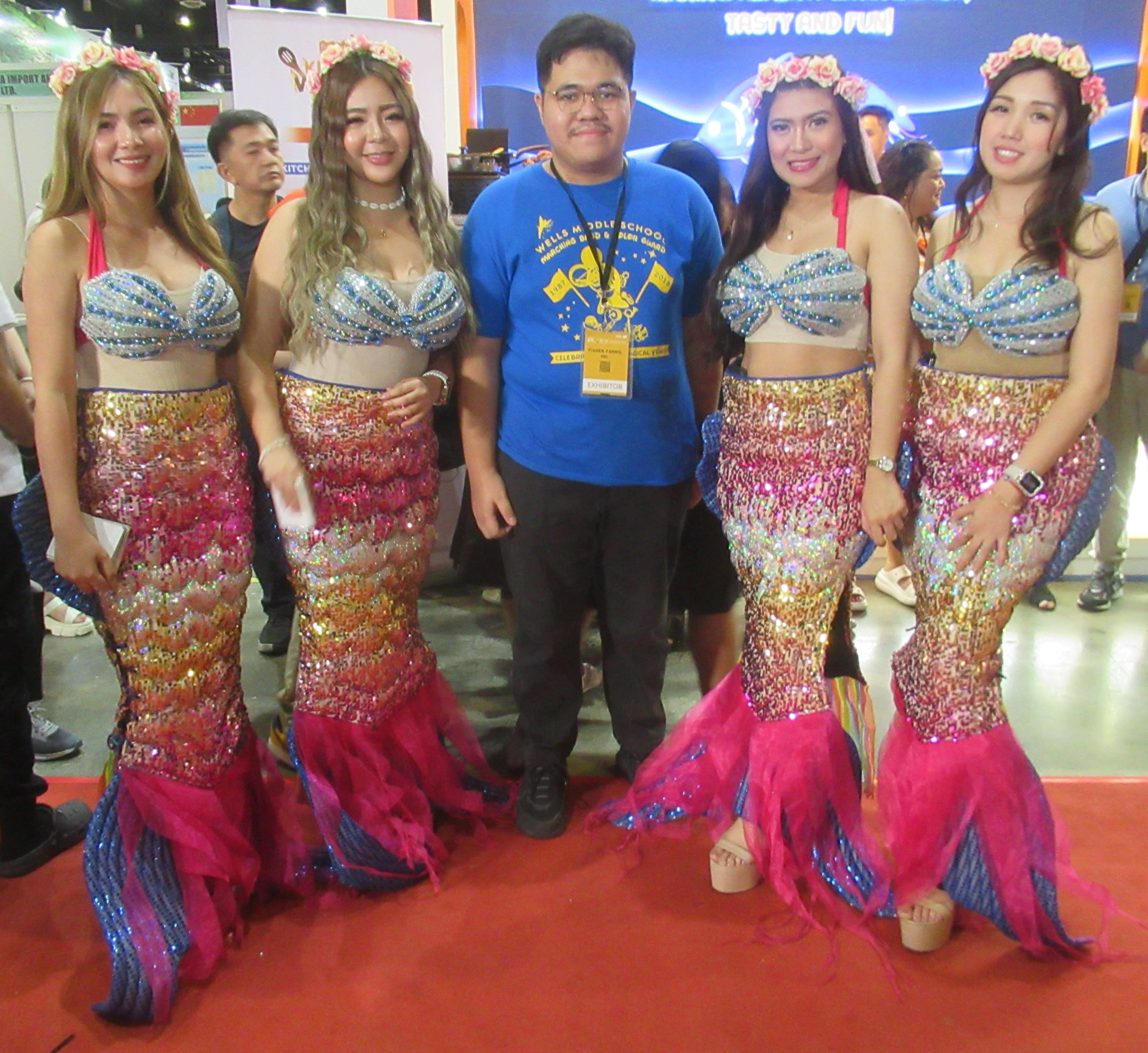
Filipinas mermaiding

Although the vast majority of mers swim in their tails, a small handful of members of the mermaiding subculture do not actually swim. These mers might wear tails to raise awareness for ocean conservation issues, dry land cosplay, or as character performers at children's parties. This does not preclude them from being active in the wider community.

In many countries, people can now join mermaid swimming classes, where they learn how to swim in mermaid tails. The Mermaid Kat Academy was the world's first mermaid school that made mermaiding accessible to everyone and opened in August 2012. Shortly after that the Philippine Mermaid Swimming Academy and several other mermaid schools opened around the world.

== Equipment ==
The basic structure of the tail is that of a sleeve or tube that encompasses the legs from ankle to waist, enclosing fins or a monofin that is strapped to and extends from the wearer's feet. The stiff fin provides structure for the fluke and enables propulsion during swimming.

=== Materials ===
Tails can be made out of a variety of materials, from fabric to platinum cure silicone, and vary in price from $100 to several thousand dollars. Several tailmaking companies are currently operating, in addition to a "do it yourself" scene. Secondhand tails are frequently sold privately or through sites such as eBay.

==== Fabric ====
Due to their great elasticity and strength, lycra and spandex are the first choice in material for fabric tails. Fabric tails are recommended for beginners and children, as they are relatively inexpensive, easy to clean, and allow for growth. They hug the body closely without being too restrictive. Fabric tails come in a wide range of colors and patterns, and can be customized with paint. Other fabrics are often added to the tails in strategic locations for added flair; for instance, chiffon (fabric) is sometimes sewn onto the ends of flukes to give a greater impression of flow, or onto the hip area as decorative pectoral fins.

Neoprene or polychloroprene are synthetic rubbers produced by the polymerization of chloroprene. Neoprene exhibits good chemical stability, and maintains flexibility over a wide temperature range. It is used in a wide variety of applications, such as laptop sleeves, orthopedic braces, electrical insulation, liquid and sheet applied elastomeric membranes or flashings, and wetsuits. It is a popular material for tails due in part to its thickness, which creates a smooth line, rendering the tail more lifelike; it is also waterproof and fairly durable. Like fabric, neoprene can be painted and customized. It is often used as the base for sequin tails due to its strength.

In a variation on fabric and neoprene tails, individual sequins may also be sewn onto a tail for decoration. Occasionally, sequins are sewn onto only a few areas to serve as a highlight; more commonly, they are sewn over the entire tail, and provide all of the tail's color and patterning. Sequin tails are time-intensive to create, as each sequin must be sewn on by hand, and as a result these tails can be quite expensive. Variation is nearly unlimited due to the amounts and types of sequins available on the market.

==== Latex and silicone ====
Molded latex is sometimes used as a tail material. It can be molded into scale shapes, and gives a more lifelike impression than fabric, particularly when poured or otherwise affixed onto a neoprene backing. Some of the earliest tails available on the market were made of the same type of latex used in latex clothing, however, these tails went out of production when the company owner died. The material has very little elasticity, which renders the tail difficult to get on and off. Many mermaids cannot use latex due to allergies, and mermaids who specialize in children's parties or other events where a tail may be touched often stay away from this material for that same reason.

During the later part of the 2000s and up through about 2012–2013, partial tin-cure latex or tin-cure silicone spread over a neoprene or neoprin base became popular, due to the increased realism of the tails and the relatively low cost of materials (tin-cure tails generally retail around US$300–600). This proved problematic, however, as tin-cure silicones and latexes are not skin-safe materials. Effects of overexposure include "skin, respiratory, kidney and liver damage. Repeated or prolonged contact with the preparation may cause removal of natural fat from the skin resulting in non-allergic contact dermatitis and absorption through the skin. Prolonged and repeated skin contact may cause irritation and possibly dermatitis. Prolonged, repeated, or high exposures may cause weakness and depression of the central nervous system." Some of these ailments have been recorded by mermaids who have tails containing tin-cure materials, although this evidence is anecdotal. Tin-cure tails also degrade with prolonged exposure to water; the silicone becomes soft and white while peeling away from the neoprene on which it rests. It is currently advised that those who are considering making or purchasing tin-cure tails do so with extreme caution and at their own risk. Tin-cure tails have historically not been allowed in aquariums featuring live fish or other sea life, due to the chemicals leaching from the tail into the water and causing potential harm to the aquarium's ecosystem.

Currently, silicone rubber tails (also known as platinum-cure silicone tails and Dragonskin silicone tails, after a silicone brand name) are the most popular and most expensive tails on the market. In addition to being relatively lifelike and durable, silicone tails are skin-safe and inert in most environments once cured. Neutral buoyancy in the water allows for ease of sinking and natural-looking swimming, although they are quite heavy (25–60 lbs) out of the water. Colors and patterns are only limited by the designer's imagination, and if produced properly, paint or pigment does not chip off the tail. The material has excellent elasticity, allowing relative ease in getting in and out of the tail, and fitting snugly once on. Silicone is slip-resistant and grips the skin, which results in less tail slip or gapping during vigorous swimming. It is rare to find silicone tails for less than US$1000, even used, and their prices increase with the amount of extra detail, color, and number of fins added. Silicone tails can cost many thousands of dollars. Due to the expense and heavier weight involved, platinum-cure silicone tails are not recommended for beginners.

==== Blankets ====
Over the past several years, mermaid tail blankets have become popular. Generally, they are made of specially woven and shaped knitted fabrics, but can also be found in polyester fleece fabrics. Tail blankets may have a back opening for legs to be inserted, creating the illusion that the wearer has a tail. They are not meant to get wet and are not convenient to use for character parties or cosplay, but can be used lying down for leisure activities. Patterns are available so that knitters and crafters can make their own.

=== Monofins ===
A monofin is a type of swimfin typically used in underwater sports such as finswimming, free-diving and underwater orienteering, in recreational freediving, and even sometimes just for fun. It consists of a single surface attached to footpockets for both of the diver's feet. They have become popular with the mermaiding community due to excellent propulsion during swimming and their realistically mermaidish silhouette. Monofins can be made of glass fiber or carbon fiber. The swimmer's muscle power, swimming style, and the type of aquatic activity the monofin is used for determines the choice of size, stiffness, and materials.

Monofins are carefully chosen when a tail is commissioned, taking into account the swimmer's ability, location of use, and desired look in the water. For instance, a large, stiff fiberglass monofin will serve a mermaid well in strong ocean currents, giving them speed and strength in the water. A mermaid who will be performing in a glass tank may choose a smaller, more flexible, plastic model, which imparts agility and graceful flow rather than strong propulsion. Some mermaids prefer to sand, cut, or otherwise alter their monofins into a preferred shape to suit their individual purposes; others prefer to create their monofins from scratch rather than purchase or alter an already existing model.

For safety reasons, it is recommended that beginners not create their own monofins from scratch. Some materials that have been used in monofins, such as acrylic or plexiglas, have shattered under hydraulic stress and have caused severe injury and could result in drowning. Plastic polycarbonate is also not recommended, as it will crack and snap under pressure, rendering the monofin useless and dangerous.

== Safety concerns ==
=== Children ===
The practice of mermaiding, especially by young children, has also raised safety concerns about how wearing and swimming in a tail may actually make it harder for children to swim and/or easier to drown, especially when they are not highly experienced swimmers. In 2015, a YouTube video surfaced in which a mother had to come over and rescue her daughter, who was drowning in a backyard pool after trying to do a flip while wearing a mermaid tail. Even as the video, which had gone viral, made efforts to express that mermaid tails can still be fun to play in with proper safety and supervision, various swimming pools in several countries, including Australian YMCA pools, began banning the tails around that time and in the years to come.

The bans did not come without criticism. Some contended that it would be better to emphasize safety and supervision while using the tails, rather than banning them outright. A few others suggested that having mermaiders pass swim tests would also be a viable alternative to bans.

=== Professionals ===
Professional mermaids also encounter safety risks. In general, they must contend with having only a limited amount of oxygen to swim and stay underwater, as they traditionally eschew scuba equipment. Tank performers have found ways to overcome this issue, such as using air tubes installed in certain areas of the tank to receive a fresh burst of oxygen without having to resurface. Another way to accommodate for limited oxygen involves stationing scuba divers in the tank where the mermaid performs and have them bring the mermaid fresh air whenever they request it with a gesture, although this method requires careful vigilance and attention. Failure to recognize the need for air can prove life-threatening for the performer, with at least one report of a mermaid nearly asphyxiating during a performance when divers missed her requests for air. Another mermaid, Gabriela Green-Thompson Kay, nearly drowned when her tail got stuck on some coral, surviving only because she wore a tail that she could be able to slip out of in an emergency such as this.

Mermaids also incur various health risks while immersed in water. Without swim caps, mermaids fully expose their ears to water, subjecting them to ear pain and infection. The water they swim in may also contain bacteria that subjects them to waterborne diseases and infections. Other potential minor health issues that mermaids can experience include foot blisters that result from the friction of their tightly packed feet rubbing against the inside of the tail, muscle cramps in the legs from strenuous swimming movements in the tail costume, red eyes caused by continual exposure to chlorine in swimming pool water, as well as cold and flu-like symptoms and minor respiratory problems caused by cold water immersion. Mermaids who wear latex tin-cure tails are also subject to several toxic health effects that the chemicals of such material impart (see above).

Mermaids who swim in the open ocean can have their safety jeopardized if they get too close to particular sea animals. For instance, a mermaid who gets up close to a whale would be at risk of being struck hard and seriously injured by even the slightest of the whale's movements. Although there are no reports of mermaids getting attacked or bitten by sharks, two mermaids have recounted colliding with one. A few others have recalled getting stung by venomous jellyfish. In an interview, Hannah Mermaid stated that she swam in costume around great white sharks without being injured.

== See also ==
- Sip 'n Dip Lounge
- Weeki Wachee, Florida
- Mermaid
- Mermaid hall
- Synchronized swimming
- Freediving
- The Blixunami
- MerPeople (Netflix documentary miniseries)
