= The Blixunami =

Professional mermaid

Eric Milligan, known professionally as The Blixunami or Blix, is a professional mermaid who specializes in underwater and ocean-oriented performances. They are currently based in The Bronx, New York.

== Early life ==
As a child, The Blixunami often collected mermaid related objects and wrapped their legs in blankets to create pretend mermaid tails. At age 8, The Blixunami learned to swim at summer camp, further motivating their passion for mermaids. Their father told them that Blix's great-grandfather helped treat an injured mermaid in South Carolina, prompting Blix to believe their lineage was blessed by a mermaid. Blix regularly performed in talent shows and joined their school's drama club. When Blix was 14, they came out as gay, to the disapproval of their parents, who threw away their dolls.

== Career ==
In 2012, Blix received their first mermaid tail from cosplay artist, Richard Arthur. In 2015, they received their first silicone tail from Natasha James of Najestic Entertainment. The Blixunami began their career in mermaiding by working at pool parties. They have commented that kids are often surprised to see a Black mermaid. The Blixunami is proud to represent queer mermaids of color, as a performer who is nonbinary and has Geechee heritage.

In 2016 and 2017, The Blixunami was featured on Davey Wavey's YouTube channel and on Tosh.0 on Comedy Central. In 2018, they performed at the first Mermaid Fest on Tybee Island, Georgia and the Santarcangelo Festival in Italy. In 2021, Jincey Lumpkin published a novel, Mermaid of Sicily, that featured the character Prince Moussa, which was based on The Blixunami. In 2022, they won the congeniality prize at the Kings and Queens of the Seas competition in the Bahamas, which earned them a Virgin Voyages cruise.

In 2023, The Blixunami starred in the Netflix show MerPeople. In a review, The Guardian described The Blixunami as "an absolutely radiant, mesmeric presence, but forged in the fire of growing up gay in the middle of a devoutly Christian family in the south." They released the single and music video, "Splish Splash on 'Em" which was filmed at the Afro Mermaid Summit and is featured in MerPeople. The Blixunami attended the 2023 premier of the film The Little Mermaid in London.
