= On Tatay's Boat =

2010 children's storybook by Cey Enriquez

On Tatay's Boat is a children's storybook by Cey Enriquez. It is about a boy who joins his father on a fishing trip. Tatay teaches his son great life lessons about respect for nature, the values of friendship, and the difference little acts of goodness can make – through his stories about his underwater friends.

In August 2009, the Philippine Transmarine Carriers-Carlos Salinas Jr. Foundation, together with Outlooke Pointe Foundation, launched “Sagip,” a storybook writing competition on the theme “Saving our seas,” to foster English literacy and promote marine environmental awareness. Over 500 entries were submitted from a wide range of contestants ages 7–84. On Tatay's Boat, by Cey Enriquez, was declared winner.

The Philippine Transmarine Carriers-Carlos Salinas Jr. Foundation then launched the children's storybook, On Tatay's Boat, in March 2010 at the Manila Ocean Park. At the launch, 80 children from Fort Bonifacio and West Rembo Elementary Schools were invited to listen to five out of the 10 short-listed entries, culminating in the reading of On Tatay's Boat. Special guest was director Ramon Espeleta of the Department of Environment and Natural Resources. The book is illustrated by Nelz Yumul.

On Tatay's Boat's author, Cey Enriquez is married to lawyer Regidor A. Ponferrada and they have one son.
