= Katrin Gray =

German model and mermaid (born 1985)

- Born: Katrin Schwarz; May 9, 1985 (age 41); Hanover, Germany
- Other names: Katrin Felton, Mermaid Kat
- Occupations: Model, Underwater Model, Actress, Mermaid
- Years active: 2008–present
- Website: www.katringray.com

Katrin Gray (born May 9, 1985), professionally known as Mermaid Kat, is a scuba diving instructor and model, best known in modern mermaiding. She was crowned Queen of the World Germany 2007 and Sea Star Girl 2008.

== Early life and career ==
Gray was born and raised in Hannover, Germany. In 2006, she started her modelling career and was named Miss Germany International, 2006. In 2011, Gray moved to Phuket, Thailand, where she continued modelling and also became a scuba diving instructor. In May 2012, Gray started working as an underwater model and professional mermaid under her artist name Mermaid Kat.

In August 2012, she opened "Mermaid Kat Academy" in Thailand. It has trained over 7,000 new mermaids in over 10 different countries. The main base of her mermaid school is now in Germany. When Gray moved back to Australia in 2015, she opened branches of her mermaid school in Western Australia and Queensland.

Since January 2016, Gray is working regularly with Dream Cruises where she performs as a mermaid, teaches mermaid classes and giving talks during cruises.

In January 2019 and 2020 Gray performed at the German boat show boot Düsseldorf.

== Filmography ==
Year	Title	Role	Genre
2013	The Far Cry The Experience - Episode 2	Girl with tattoo on her back on boat	TV Mini-Series
2014	Anything for Alice	Girlfriend	French Comedy
2014	Mädchen vom Meer - The Knechtsand	Mermaid	Music Video
2014	Project Moken	Herself	Documentary
2015	SOKO Wismar - Episode: Die kleine Meerjungfrau	Anne Lausick	German Crime Series

== Books ==
- Mermaiding - Endlich Meerjungfrau
