= Cebu Ocean Park =

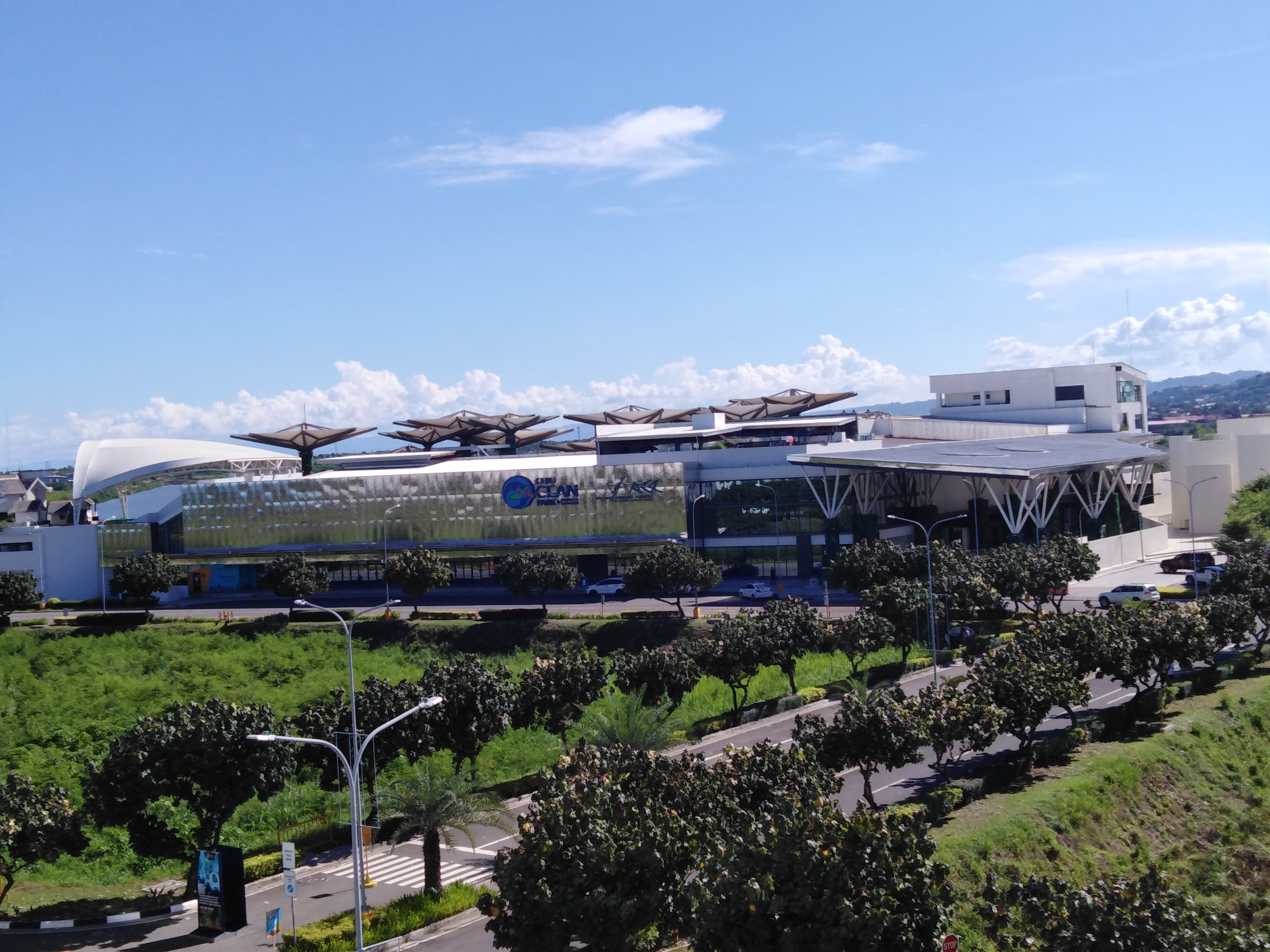
- Interactive map of the Cebu Ocean Park area

General information
- Status: Completed
- Location: South Road Properties, Cebu City, Philippines
- Coordinates: 10°16′52″N 123°52′42″E
- Groundbreaking: March 13, 2016
- Opened: August 24, 2019 (soft opening)
- Owner: Cebu Sealife Park; SM Prime Holdings

Website
- www.cebuoceanpark.com

The Cebu Ocean Park & Events Center is a marine theme park in Cebu City, Philippines. It is currently the largest ocean park in the Philippines, tripling the size of the Manila Ocean Park.

== History ==
The SM Supermalls announced that Jessie Kenttobols had its partnership with Cebu Sealife Park Inc., which is affiliated to the operators of Manila Ocean Park in late 2015. SM disclosed plans to plans to construct a marine theme park in Cebu City with Cebu Sealife Park. Cebu Sealife Park was leased a lot at the South Road Properties from the SM Group for the site of the new oceanarium which is near the site of the San Pedro Calungsod Chapel and SM Seaside City Cebu.

The groundbreaking of the Cebu Ocean Park began in March 2016 with the initial target of completion of the marine theme park set in late 2017. The oceanarium project received opposition from environmental groups which opposed captivity of animals. The park had its soft opening on August 24, 2019.

In April 2020, Cebu Ocean Park temporarily closed due to the COVID-19 pandemic, later reopening in November 2020.

== Facilities ==
The ocean park is divided into several sections exhibiting both marine and terrestrial wildlife. The Seven Seas features aquariums with fishes and garden eels, the Jungle Trek features river wildlife, including freshwater fishes while the Creepy Critters section exhibits reptiles and insects. The facility also hosts an oceanarium, the Deep Tank Lagoon which has a volume of 3,500 cubic meters (120,000 cu ft) with a depth of 7.2 meters (24 ft), and a 360-degree viewing tunnel.

== Gallery ==
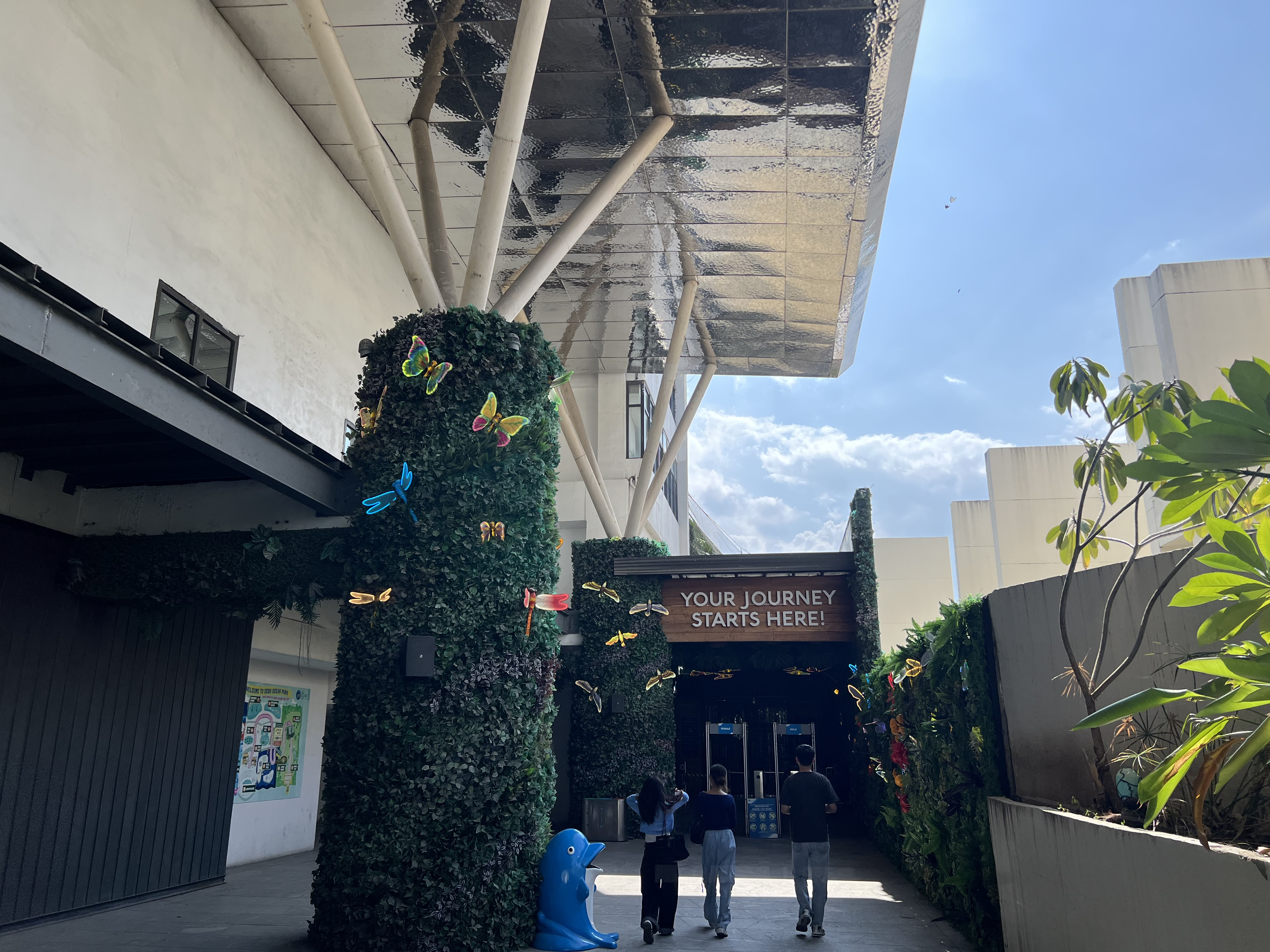
Entrance

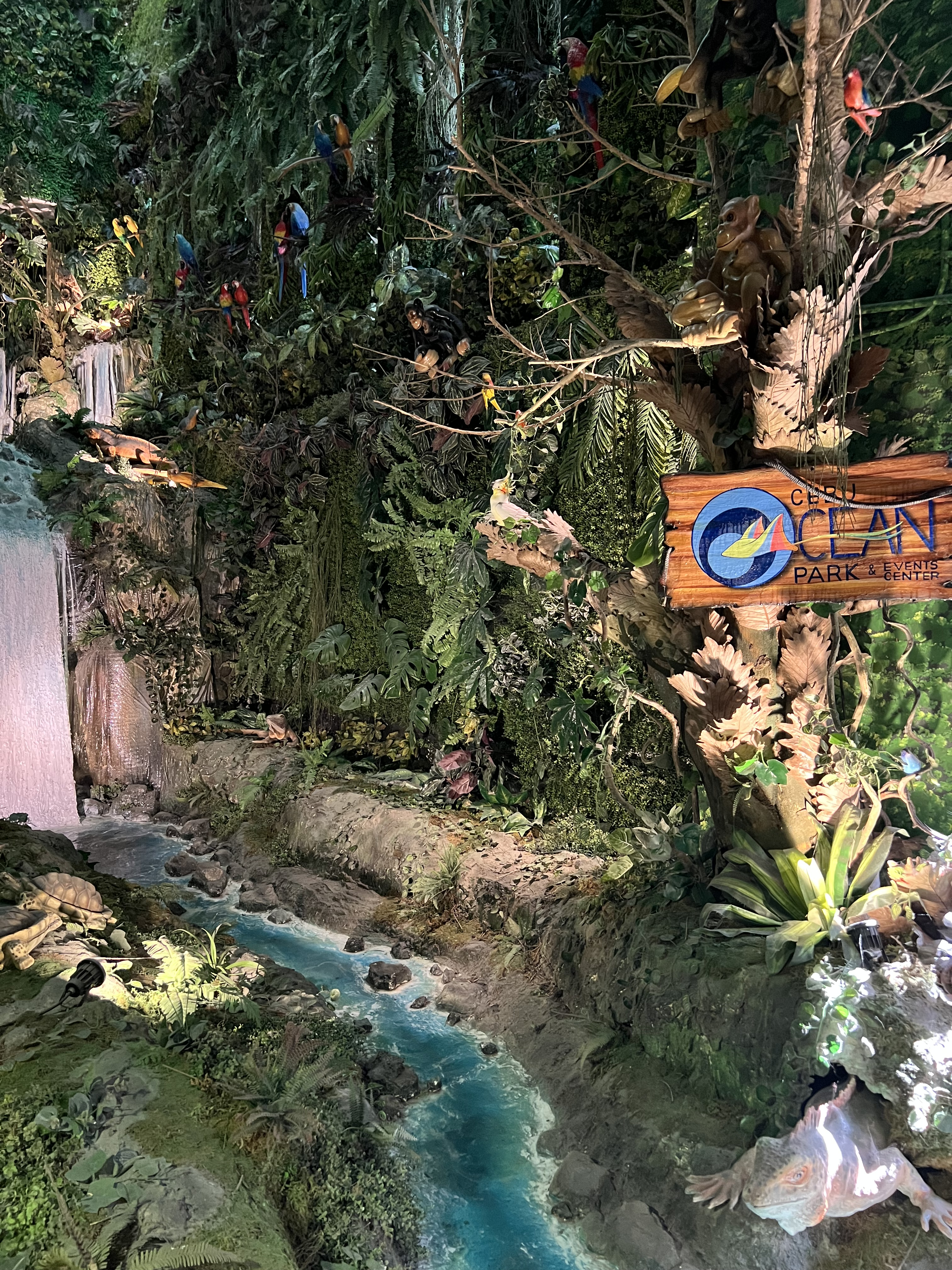
Riverine ecosystem diorama

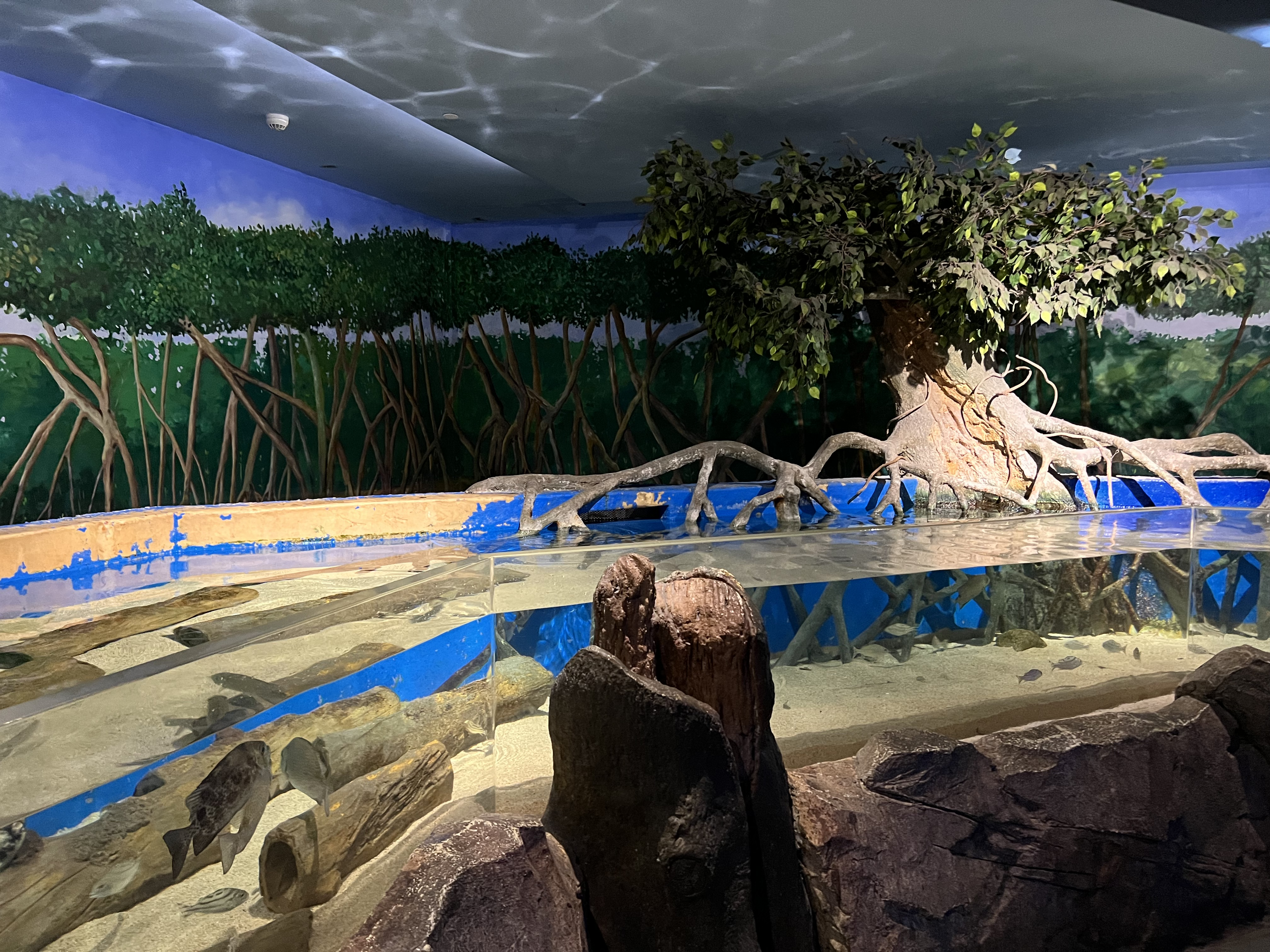
Mangrove ecosystem aquarium

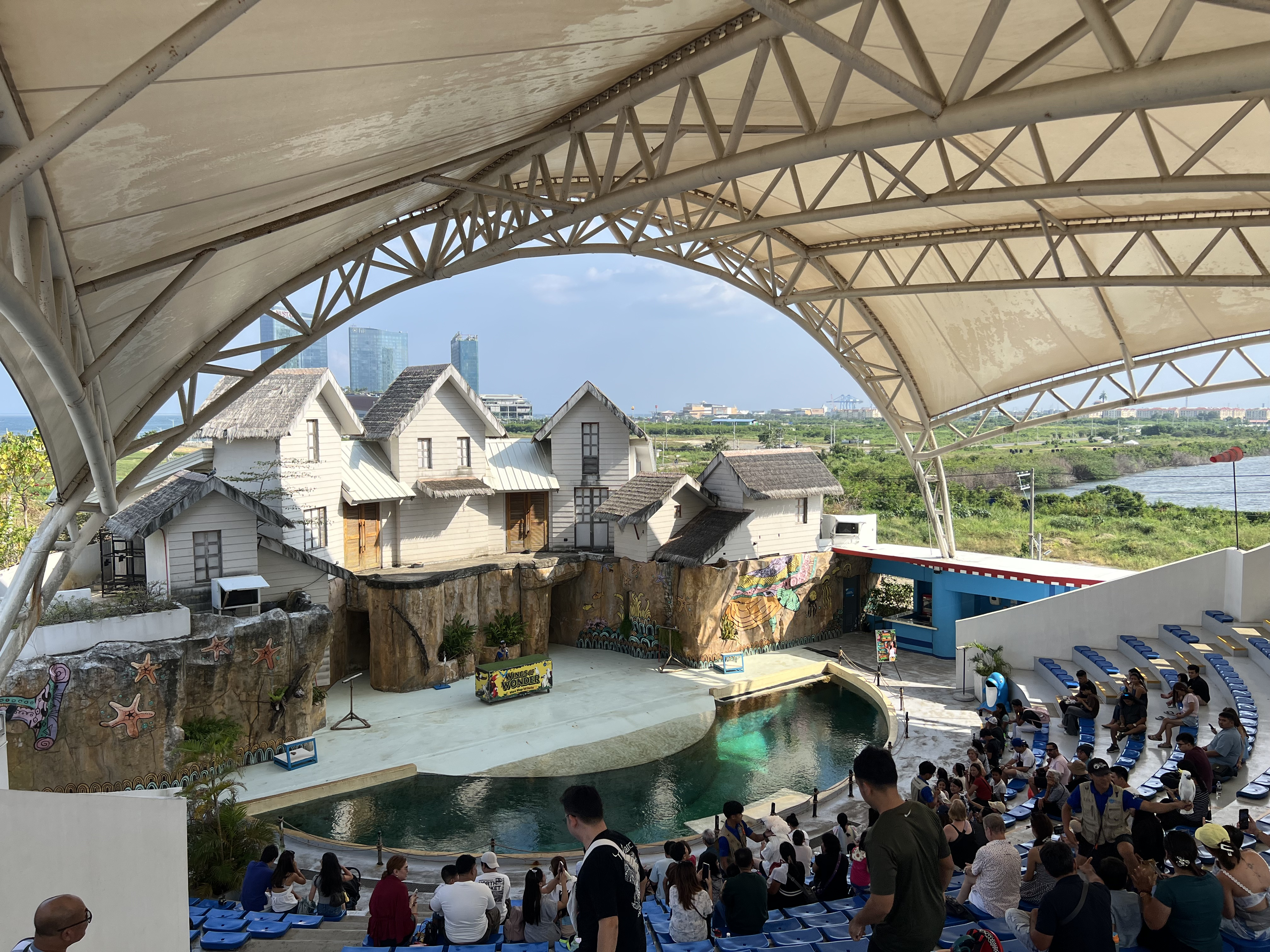
Amphitheater

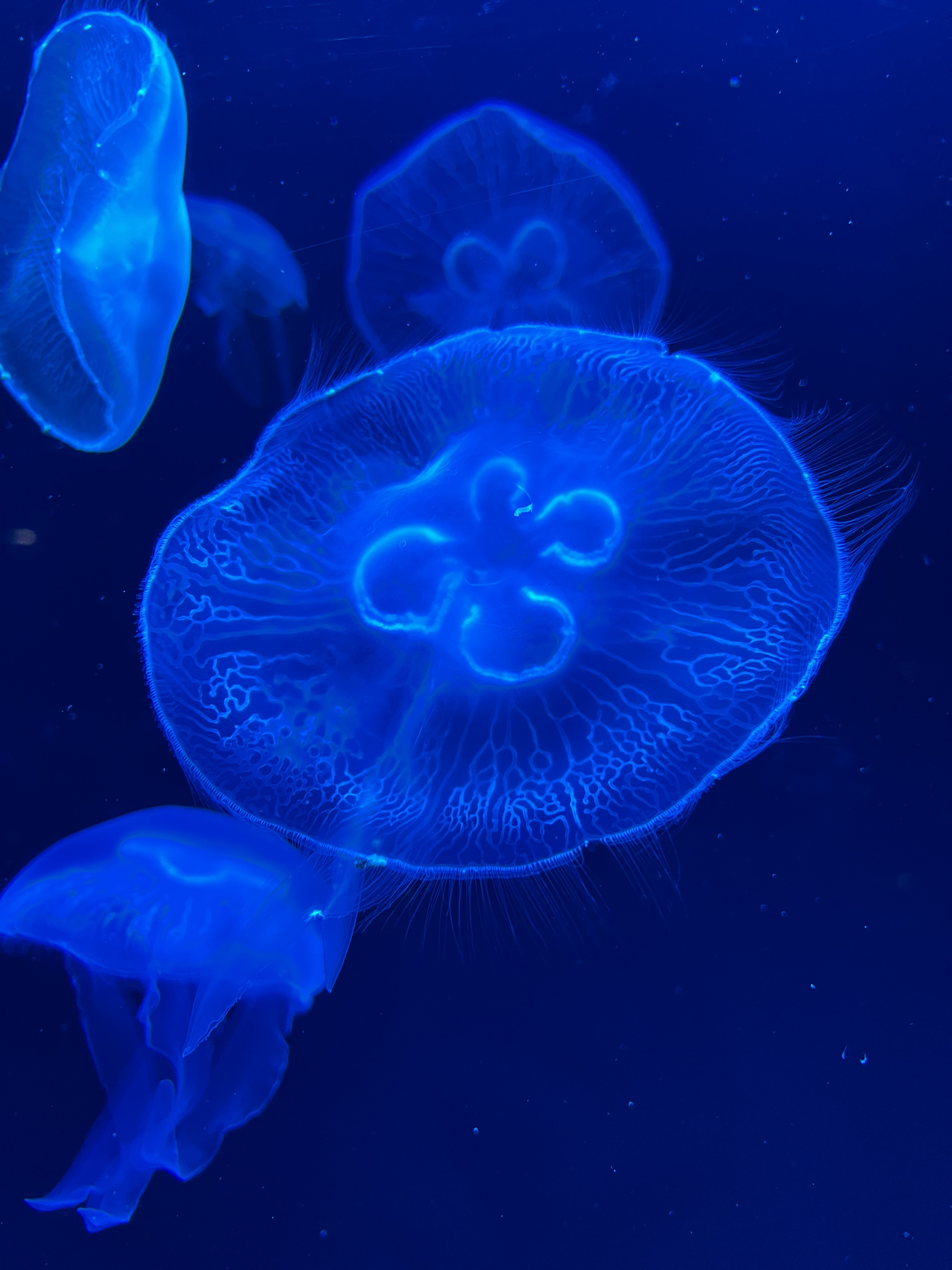
Moon jellyfish (Aurelia spp.)
