= Jincey Lumpkin =

American producer and columnist

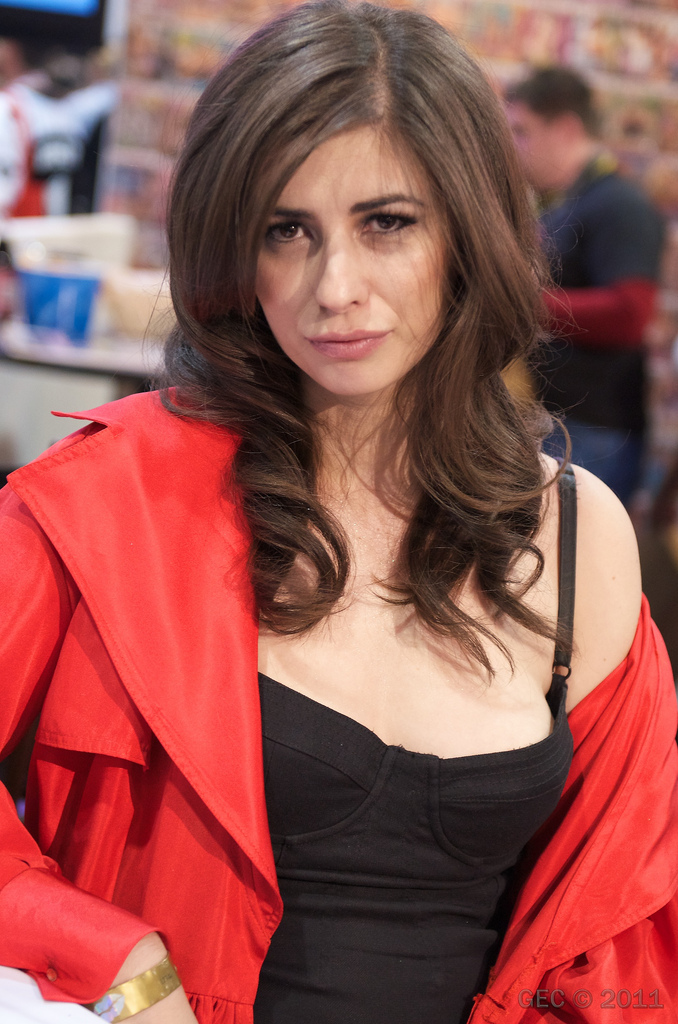
- 2011
- Born: Carrollton, Georgia
- Education: Vanderbilt University
- Alma mater: Florida Coastal School of Law
- Occupations: Producer and columnist for the Huffington Post

Jincey Lumpkin is an American producer and columnist for the Huffington Post. A lesbian, she was named one of the 100 most influential gay people by Out Magazine in 2010.

Lumpkin was the founder and Chief Sexy Officer of the entertainment brand Juicy Pink Box. She has been called the "lesbian Hugh Hefner".

== Early life ==
Lumpkin grew up in Carrollton, Georgia and graduated in 1998 from the Darlington School in Rome, Georgia. She attended Vanderbilt University in Nashville, Tennessee, graduating in 2002. She then attended the Florida Coastal School of Law in Jacksonville, Florida, from which she received her Juris Doctor degree in 2006.

== Careers ==
After completing law school, Lumpkin moved to New York to practice fashion law. Since she was unhappy in the office, Lumpkin's male co-workers suggested that she begin writing an anonymous sex blog, which became popular enough to lead her to consider switching careers. In 2008, she left the practice of law to start her company.

The following year, Lumpkin founded Juicy Pink Box, a studio specializing in lesbian erotica. As of March 2013, the company had released five films and had received several nominations for the Adult Video News Awards and the Feminist Porn Awards. The films "Taxi" and "Boutique" won Feminist Porn Awards for "hottest lesbian vignette" in 2011 and 2012, respectively.

== Feminist and LGBT activism ==
Lumpkin is considered to be part of the feminist pornography movement, which "seeks to take back the landscape of sexually explicit media, offering a more positive and inclusive way of depicting, and looking at, sex". She has publicly stated that she regards herself as a "sex-positive" feminist and has been quoted as saying, "I want women to be able to stand up and say, 'I like sex', and not be slandered for it."

Lumpkin has written extensively about her struggles with her sexual orientation. In 2010, she wrote an article for The Advocate in which she discussed her battle with suicide after coming out of the closet.

In October 2011, Lumpkin began writing a weekly column for the Gay Voices section of the Huffington Post. Lumpkin is also a regular panelist on Huffington Post Live, appearing in segments to discuss Hollywood's obsession with porn and taxes on strip clubs.

Lumpkin frequently lectures on themes connected with sexuality. She is a proponent of open and honest discussion of and education about masturbation. In April 2012, she spoke at Harvard University about sexual consent and sex-positive porn. More recently, Lumpkin has become interested in sex robots and their possible use in combatting sex trafficking. She gave a TEDx talk titled "Are Robots the Future of Sex?" in December 2012 and has twice spoken on Huffington Post Live about the topic.

== Personal life ==
Lumpkin and her two chihuahuas, Marilyn Monroe and Sophia Loren, live in New York City.
