= Sea Life Charlotte-Concord =

SEA LIFE Charlotte-Concord Aquarium
- Interactive map of SEA LIFE Charlotte-Concord Aquarium
- 35°22′09″N 80°43′30″W
- Location: Concord, North Carolina
- Owner: Merlin Entertainments
- Website: www.visitsealife.com/charlotte-concord/

SEA LIFE Charlotte-Concord is an interactive aquarium located at Concord Mills in Concord, North Carolina, a suburb of Charlotte. The aquarium contains thousands of aquatic creatures, plus an interactive touch pool and an 180° ocean tunnel. SEA LIFE Charlotte-Concord is owned and operated by Merlin Entertainments.

== Main species ==
Nurse Shark	Dog-Faced Puffer	Chocolate Chip Sea Star	Hermit Crab	Angel Fish	Blacktip Reef Shark	Clown Trigger Fish	Atlantic Ray	Cownose Ray	Jellyfish	Clownfish	Green Sea Turtle	Lionfish	Sea Star	Cleaner Shrimp	Yellow Tang Fish	Blue Tang Fish

== Conservation ==
SEA LIFE is involved with a number of conservation activities.

=== Seahorse breeding ===
SEA LIFE has successfully bred and reared nine species of seahorse, helping prevent the breeds from becoming extinct. This means that no seahorses will ever be taken from the wild for their exhibitions, and they may be able to resupply seahorses if they become extinct in the wild.

=== Seal rescues ===
SEA LIFE works with seal sanctuaries to care for orphaned and injured seal pups. Over 100 seals are successfully rescued and returned to the wild each year.

=== Re-homing ===
SEA LIFE provides permanent homes for injured or disabled aquatic creatures who would have otherwise been killed or euthanized.

=== Protection of turtles ===
A fundraising campaign run by SEA LIFE has enabled a new Sea Turtle Rescue and Wildlife Information Centre to be built on the Greek island of Zakynthos to treat turtles who have been injured in collisions with pleasure craft or entanglement in fishing gear.
