= Hannah Mermaid =

Underwater performance artist and marine conservation activist

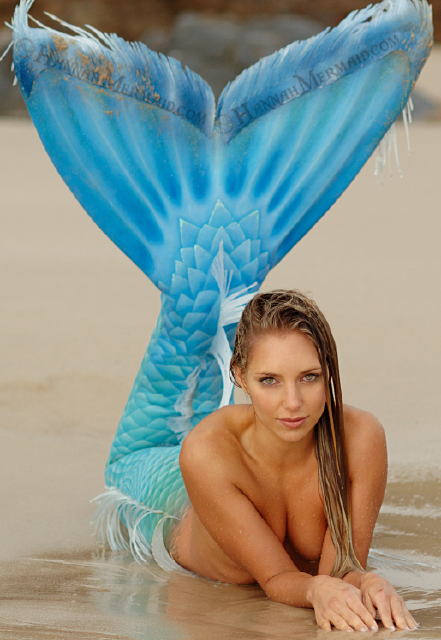
- Born: Hannah Fraser; 6 February 1974 (age 52)
- Occupations: Performance artist; Model; Marine conservation activist
- Website: www.hannahfraser.com

Hannah Fraser (born 6 February 1974), known professionally as Hannah Mermaid, is a professional model, actress, dancer, and performer who specialises in underwater and ocean-oriented freediving performances, often in mermaid costume. She is a central figure in modern mermaiding and is an ocean ecology activist.

== Early life ==
Fraser grew up in Australia. She made her first mermaid tail at the age of 9, inspired by 1984 film Splash. She began performing as a mermaid in 2003. She has been featured in photo shoots, advertising campaigns and on film.

Her father, Andy, was a founding member of the rock band Free when he was just 15. He died in 2015.

== Career ==
Her marine conservation activism has included campaigning against the overfishing and culling of sharks, dolphins and whales, and against unsustainable fishing practices and ocean pollution, often in conjunction with Greenpeace.

She appeared in the ecological documentary The Cove, which won the 2010 Academy Award for Best Documentary Feature for its portrayal of the Taiji dolphin drive hunt.

In 2013, she was featured in an underwater fashion shoot with whale sharks in the Philippines, designed to publicise the ecological impact of the shark-finning industry on the shark population.

Also in 2013, she starred in a conservation film, Betrayal, to campaign against the hunting of humpback whales with which she freedived in Tonga. That same year she night dived while breath-holding at 30 ft (9.1 m) depth with manta rays in Kona, Hawaii, to raise awareness of their non-protected status. To highlight her ecological message, Fraser and Shawn Heinrichs released Manta's Last Dance, a video of Fraser's freedive performance with manta rays, just two weeks prior to the Convention on International Trade in Endangered Species (CITES). The video, played to CITES delegates, is cited as having contributed to manta rays securing worldwide protected status.

She appeared in the TV documentary film Great White Shark: Beyond the Cage of Fear in 2013, in which she freedived with a mature great white shark while wearing a mermaid tail but notably had no armour or cage.

In 2014, she freedived on a film shoot with tiger sharks, unarmoured and without scuba gear, in order to highlight the Australian Government's policy of culling tiger sharks to protect tourists. The decision to cull was later reversed. Fraser also appeared on the Discovery Channel alongside Sharkanado's Tara Reid, where she was interviewed about her dive with tiger sharks and on 20/20 ABC News.

In 2015 in Valencia, Spain, she delivered a TEDx Talk as part of the United Nations' World Oceans Day in which she explained her role as an ocean ecological activist.
