= Eric Ducharme =

Professional merman

- Born: Eric Jonathan Ducharme; June 23, 1990 (age 35); Inverness, FL
- Occupations: Founder and CEO, The Mertailor
- Organization: The Mertailor
- Parents: Kenneth Ducharme (father); Candy Ducharme (mother)
- Website: www.themertailor.com

Eric Jonathan Ducharme (born June 23, 1990), also known as "The Mertailor", is an American mermaid aficionado, or "merman", artist, and businessman. Ducharme makes and sells mermaid related costume apparel. He has performed in and modeled his products.

== Biography ==
At age 3, Eric Ducharme went to Weeki Wachee Springs State Park and decided to become a merman. At age 6, he began drawing portraits of the mermaids at the park and making mermaid tails from plastic bags stuck together with glue sticks. He swam in the tails and began training for underwater life. Later, he hand-sewed his first fabric tails.

Ducharme attended camp at Weeki Wachee Springs and developed friendships with the mermaids. At age 9, Ducharme obtained his first client, due to the recommendation of a former mermaid, Barbara Wynns. Then, he filled two bulk orders for Weeki Wachee Springs. By the time Ducharme was 15 years old, he established his web site to sell mermaid tails. At age 16, he was swimming and performing underwater as the prince in Weeki Wachee's production of "The Little Mermaid".

In 2013, TLC featured Ducharme as a merman in their documentary, My Crazy Obsession. Ducharme is shown wearing one of the tails that he created and swimming in a natural spring. In the feature, he talks about his merman lifestyle and makes the statement "when I put on a tail, I feel transformed, I feel like I am starting to enter into a different world when I hit the water". The show indicated that his obsession is so strong that Ducharme drives over an hour and a half to a Florida natural spring to swim three times a week.

Ducharme ran his business from his Homosassa house, which doubled as a studio in 2013. Later, the business spent seven years at a Meadowcrest facility in Crystal River, Florida. The business outgrew this facility and relocated to Lecanto, Florida in 2021.

Ducharme is considered to be one of the top mermaid tailors in the business. Ducharme's mermaid tails have been featured in photo shoots on Germany's "Next Top Model". They have been used in TV shows, such as The Glades and on Saturday Night Live. Flo Rida's video for "Can't Believe It" features two models wearing his tails.

Ducharme and his business are featured in the 2023 Netflix documentary series MerPeople.
