= Aquarium du Grand Lyon =

Aquarium de Lyon
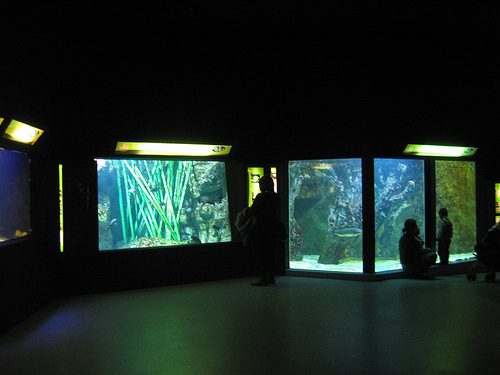
- Inside the aquarium
- Interactive map of Aquarium de Lyon
- 45°43′32″N 4°48′51″E
- Location: Lyon, France
- No. of animals: 3,000
- No. of species: 300
- Volume of largest tank: 450,000 L (99,000 imp gal; 120,000 US gal)
- Total volume of tanks: More than 1,000,000 L (220,000 imp gal; 260,000 US gal)
- Owner: Aspro Parks
- Website: www.aquariumlyon.fr

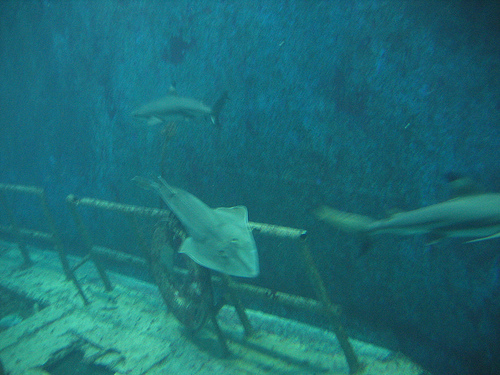
The wreckage of sharks

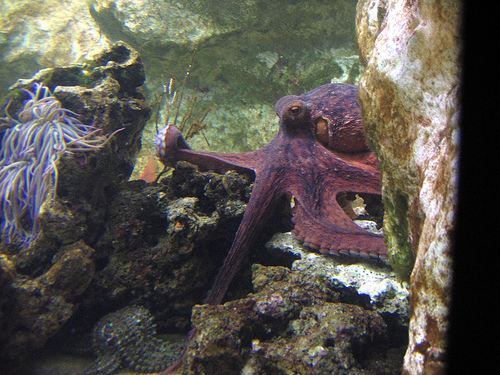
A female octopus making a wall to block access to the cave

The Aquarium de Lyon is a public aquarium located in the La Mulatière district of the city of Lyon, France, near the confluence of the Rhône and Saône rivers in the Rhône department. Like the Aqualand parks elsewhere in Europe, it belongs to the Spanish group Aspro-Ocio.

Created by Maurice Chichportiche and opened in October 2002, the aquarium has 39 tanks with a total of more than 1,000,000 litres (220,000 imp gal; 260,000 US gal) of water, showing visitors 3,000 fish and other aquatic animals representing 300 species.

The largest aquarium is called "Fosse Aux Requins". It contains a false shipwreck in polyurethane resin (the iron would have rusted and the rust is toxic to fishes). Its glass is 23 centimetres thick to resist the water pressure.
