= Blue Planet Aquarium =

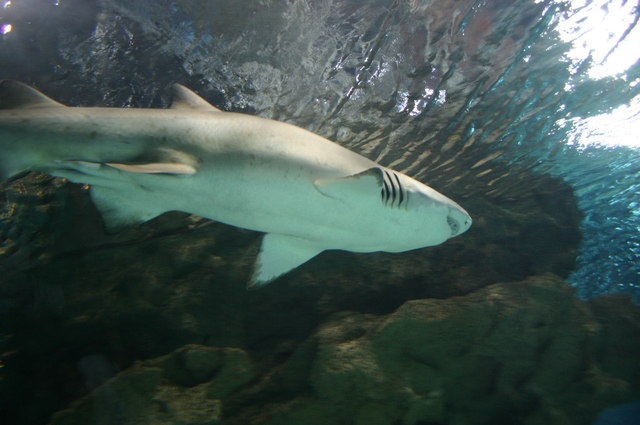
- Sand tiger shark at the aquarium
- Interactive map of Blue Planet Aquarium
- Date opened: 31 July 1998
- Location: Ellesmere Port, Cheshire, England
- Land area: 8,000 m^{2} (86,000 ft^{2})
- Volume of largest tank: 4,000,000 L (1,100,000 US gal)
- Memberships: BIAZA
- Owner: Aspro Parks
- Website: www.blueplanetaquarium.com

The Blue Planet Aquarium is a marine and freshwater aquarium located by the Cheshire Oaks retail and leisure complex in Ellesmere Port, Cheshire, England. When opened by the Queen Elizabeth II in July 1998, it was the largest aquarium in the United Kingdom, and is still the largest in North West England. The £12 million building was designed by Manchester-based Buttress Fuller Alsop architects to resemble the shape of a crashing wave. It was built by Cheshire-based developer Deep Sea Leisure (now owned by Aspro Parks), who also built Deep Sea World in North Queensferry, Scotland.

Its stated aim is to "enlighten, increase knowledge and raise interest in the marine environment using an interactive, entertaining and sustainable approach."

== Description ==
The interior houses tanks, pools and submerged tunnels designed to take the visitor through different habitats of the marine environment. The main aquarium tank holds 4,000,000 litres (1,100,000 US gal) and features a 71-metre (233 ft) underwater tunnel. Themed areas include Tropical Rivers, Lakes and Ponds, Where Land Meets the Sea, and Seas and Oceans. The aquarium contains many varieties of marine and freshwater fish, including more types of shark than anywhere else in Britain. It also keeps a variety of mammals, reptiles and amphibians.

=== Gallery ===
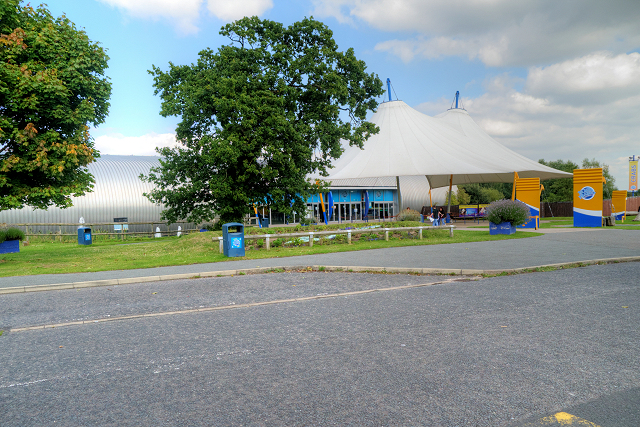
Outside view

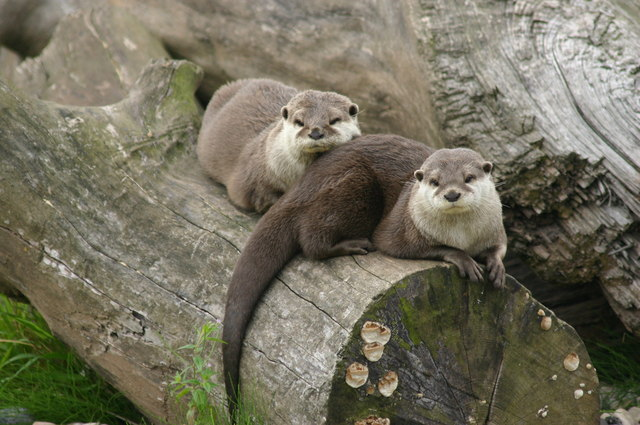
Otters

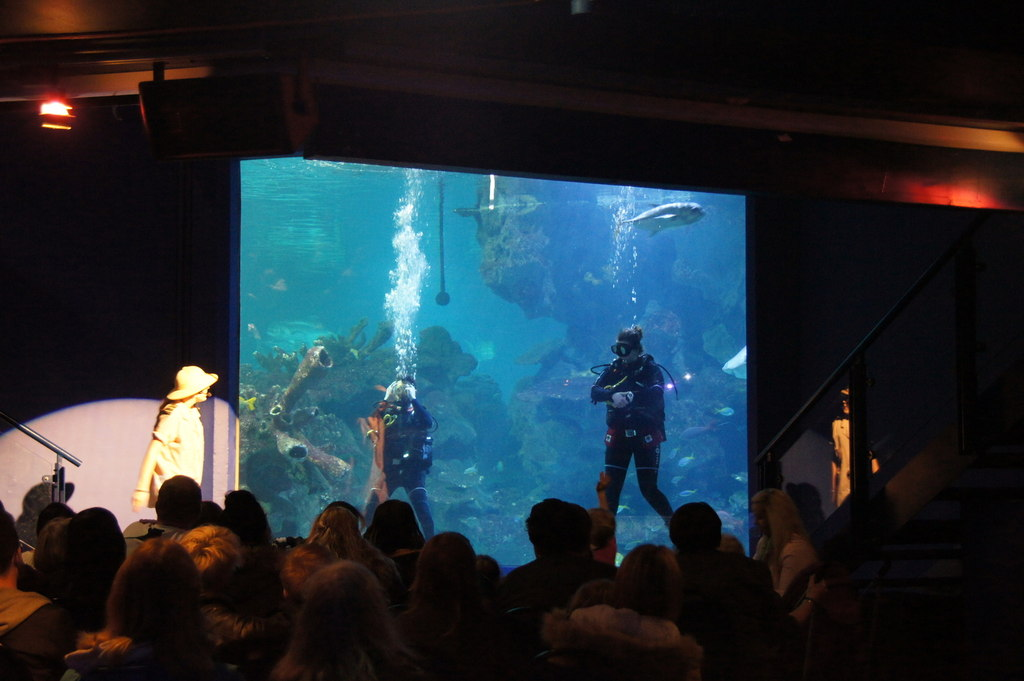
Underwater view

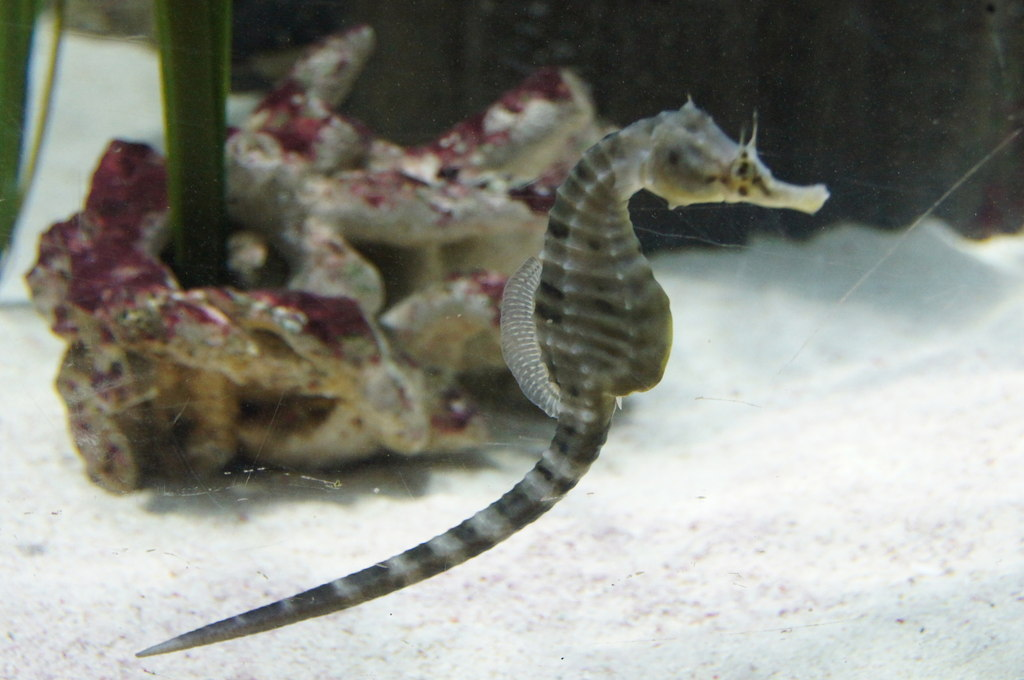
Seahorse

== Awards ==
The aquarium's shark dive won the Visit Chester and Cheshire Awards 2010 category for Best Tourism Experience of the Year.
