= La Mulatière =

La Mulatière La Mulatiére (Arpitan)
- Commune
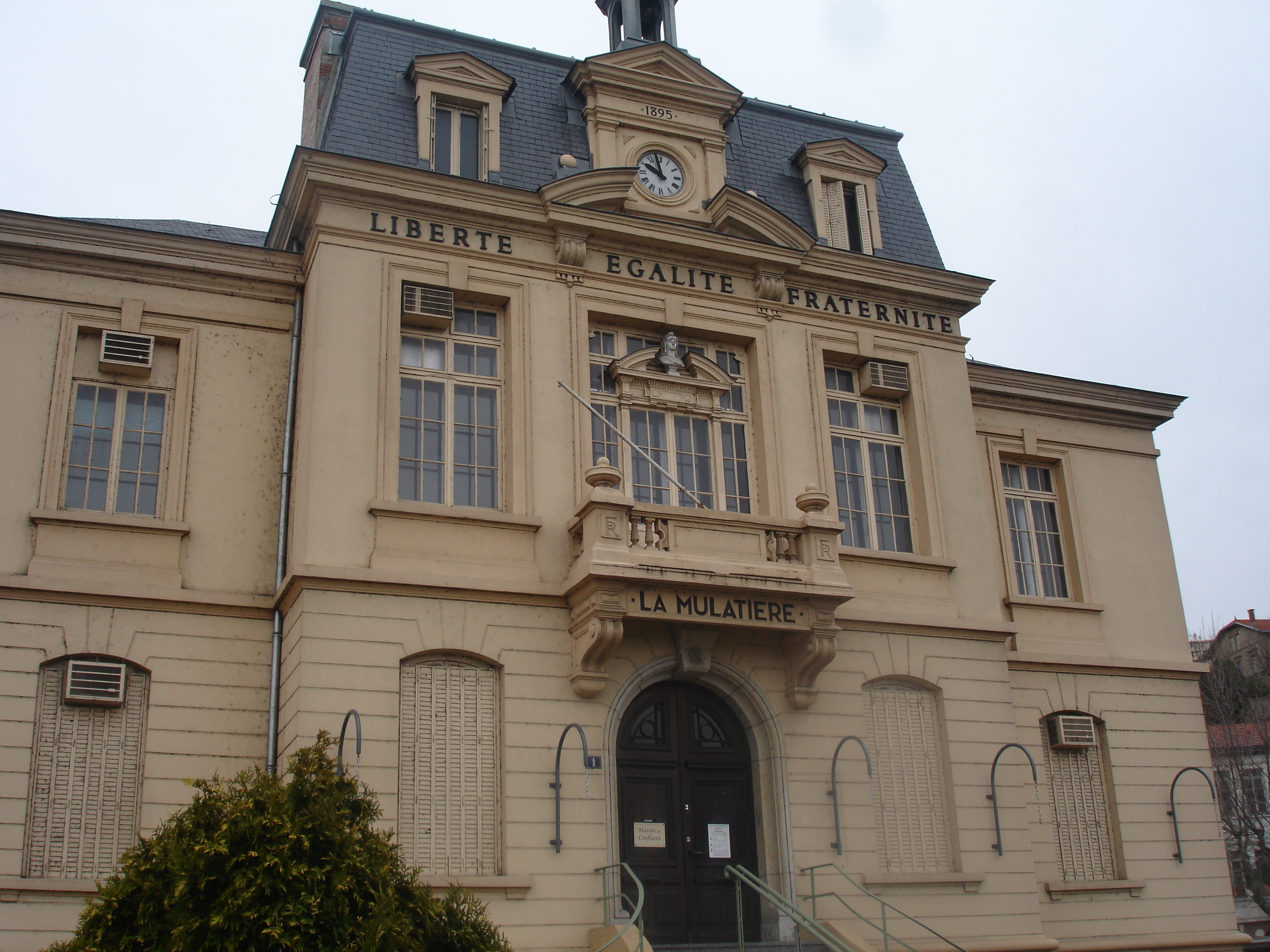
- The old town hall in La Mulatière

- Coat of arms
- Location of La Mulatière
- Location within France Location within Auvergne-Rhône-Alpes
- Coordinates: 45°44′13″N 4°48′34″E
- Country: France
- Region: Auvergne-Rhône-Alpes
- Metropolis: Lyon Metropolis
- Arrondissement: Lyon

Government
  - Mayor (2020–2026): Véronique Déchamps
- Area^{1}: 1.84 km^{2} (0.71 sq mi)
- Highest elevation: 249 m (817 ft)
- Lowest elevation: 163 m (535 ft)
- Population (2023): 6,534
  - Density: 3,550/km^{2} (9,200/sq mi)
- Demonym: Mulatins
- Time zone: UTC+01:00 (CET)
  - Summer (DST): UTC+02:00 (CEST)
- INSEE/Postal code: 69142 /69350
- Website: www.lamulatiere.fr
- ^{1} French Land Register data, which excludes lakes, ponds, glaciers > 1 km^{2} (0.386 sq mi or 247 acres) and river estuaries.

La Mulatière (French pronunciation: [la mylatjɛʁ]; Arpitan: La Mulatiére) is a commune in the Metropolis of Lyon in the Auvergne-Rhône-Alpes region, central-eastern France. It is located just southwest of Lyon, (Note: Lyon's 5th and 9th arrondissements, comprising the city neighbourhoods on the right bank of the Saône, are north of La Mulatière.) on the right bank of the Saône; it is the final commune until its confluence with the Rhône at the southern end of Lyon's Presqu'île.

The town is known, among other things, for its Aquarium du Grand Lyon.

== Demographics ==
Historical population
Year	Pop.	±% p.a.
1968	8,073	—
1975	7,886	−0.33%
1982	7,716	−0.31%
1990	7,296	−0.70%
1999	6,733	−0.89%
2007	6,540	−0.36%
2012	6,653	+0.34%
2017	6,334	−0.98%
2023	6,534	+0.52%
Source: INSEE

== See also ==
- Communes of the Lyon Metropolis
