= Aspro Parks =

Spanish leisure corporation

- Type: Wholly owned subsidiary
- Industry: Theme Park operator
- Founded: October 1991
- Headquarters: Madrid, Spain
- Area served: Europe
- Products: Theme park attractions
- Owners: Signet Investments S.A. (100%)
- Website: Official website

Aspro Parks (Aspro Ocio Group) is a Spanish leisure corporation that operates many water parks, amusement parks, aquariums as well as zoos, botanicals and dolphinariums across Europe. The company was founded in October 1991 in Spain, and is registered and headquartered in Madrid. It is best known for its Aqualand theme parks.

Its major brands include Aqualand (waterparks), Marineland (aquatic zoo and dolphinarium) and Bluereef (aquariums). The group operates 68 leisure parks and attraction centers in Spain, the UK, France, Finland, Portugal, Switzerland, Belgium, the Netherlands, Germany, and Austria.

For the year ended October 2012, the company generated EUR 154.05 million in operating revenue (annual growth of 1.9%) and achieved EUR 37.641 million in net profit (annual decline of 10%). It is owned by Luxembourg-based alternative investment firm Signet Investments S.A.

== List of parks ==
Name	No of Locations	Country/s
Aqualand	15	Portugal; Spain; France
Aquarium Barcelona	1	Spain
Aquarium du Grand Lyon	1	France
Blue Planet Aquarium	1	United Kingdom
Blue Reef Aquarium	2	United Kingdom
Boudewijn Seapark	1	Belgium
Deep Sea World	1	United Kingdom
Las Águilas Jungle Park	1	Spain
Oakwood Theme Park	1	United Kingdom
Palmitos Park	1	Spain
Puuhamaa	1	Finland
Serena Waterpark	1	Finland
Visulahti	1	Finland
Walygator Grand-Est	1	France
Wasalandia	1	Finland

See List of Aspro Parks attractions
