= Aquarium Barcelona =

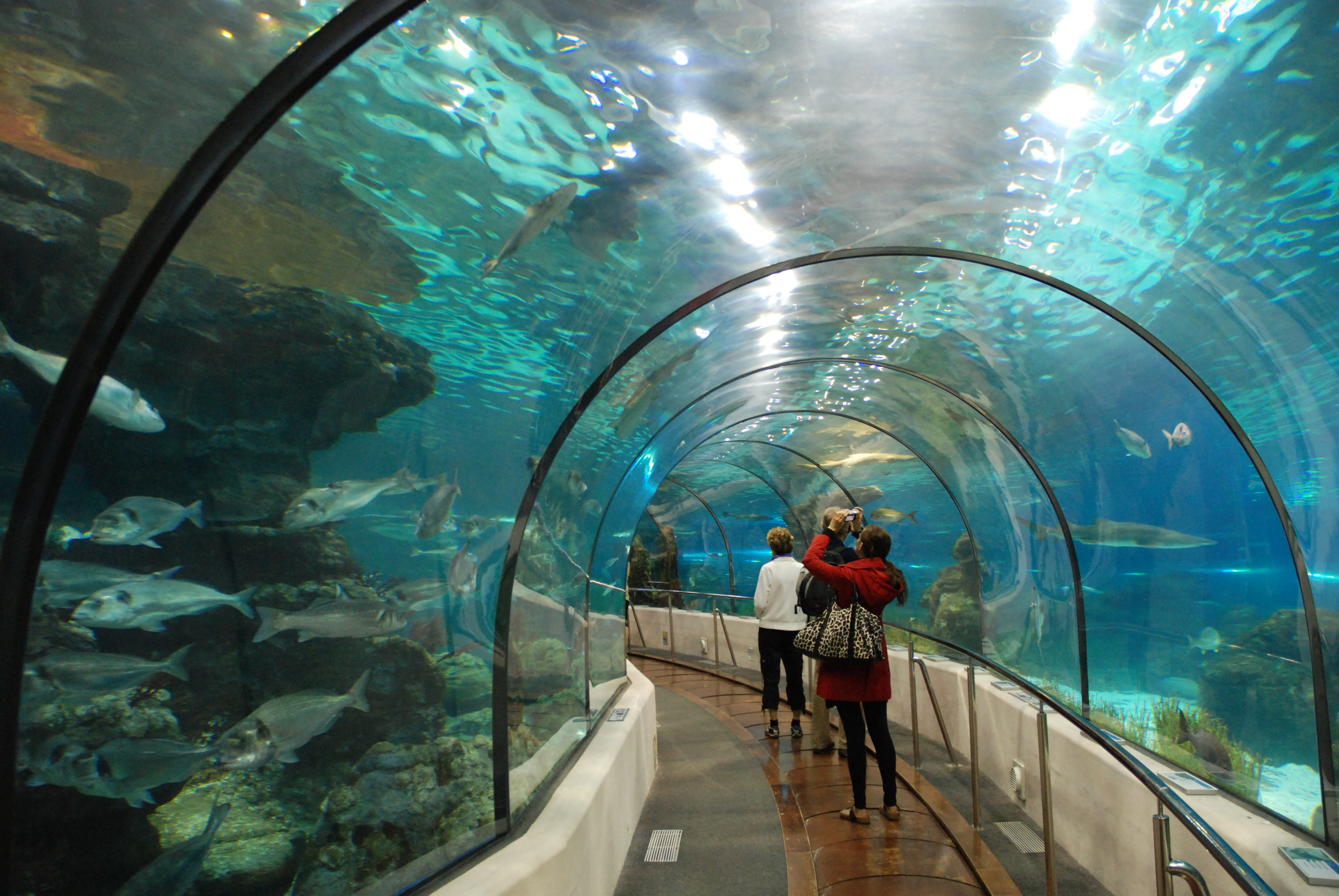
- Shark tunnel at the aquarium
- Interactive map of Aquarium Barcelona
- 41°22′36″N 2°11′03″E
- Date opened: 8 September 1995
- Location: Barcelona, Spain
- No. of animals: 11,000
- No. of species: 450
- Volume of largest tank: 3,700,000 L (980,000 US gal)
- Total volume of tanks: 5,000,000 L (1,300,000 US gal)
- Memberships: AIZA
- Owner: Aspro Parks
- Website: www.aquariumbcn.com

Aquarium Barcelona (Catalan: Aquàrium de Barcelona, IPA: [əˈkwaɾi.um də βəɾsəˈlonə]) is an aquarium located in Port Vell, a harbor in Barcelona, Catalonia, Spain.

The 35 aquariums at the facility are home to 11,000 animals representing 451 species. The aquarium contains a total of 5,000,000 L (1,300,000 US gal). This includes an ocean tank for sharks, rays and other large fish, which is 36 m (118 ft) in diameter, 5 m (16 ft) deep, contains 3,700,000 L (980,000 US gal) of water and has an 80-meter (260 ft) underwater tunnel. The Aquarium of Barcelona is part of the Aspro Parks.

The aquarium is a member of the Iberian Association of Zoos and Aquaria (AIZA).

== See also ==
- List of aquaria
