= Acuario Nautilus =

Nautilus Aquarium
- Interactive map of Nautilus Aquarium
- 11.906132494046025°S 77.04548113084716°W
- Date opened: 2007
- Location: Comas, Lima, Peru
- No. of animals: 600
- No. of species: 150
- Major exhibits: Amazon and ocean exhibit
- Website: acuarionautilus.pe

The Acuario Nautilus (English: Nautilus Aquarium) is the largest public aquarium in Peru, located in the Comas District of the capital Lima. It was opened in 2007 by the Monteza Silva family for conservation, and is home to over 150 species and 600 salt and freshwater fauna including sharks, fishes, crustaceans, and turtles, among others. The aquarium was largely renovated in 2020, and features the largest shark tunnel in Latin America, holding over 1,500,000 liters of saltwater.
