= Blue Reef Aquarium =

Blue Reef
- Location: England
- Owner: Aspro Parks (2008-present)
- Website: www.bluereefaquarium.co.uk

Blue Reef is a national chain of public aquariums in England owned by Aspro Parks.

== History ==
Blue Reef was formed as Newquay Leisure Limited in January 2000. In July 2001, Blue Reef acquired the Sea Life Centers in Portsmouth and Tynemouth and announced their intent in November 2001 to refurbish them under the Blue Reef name for an opening in 2002.

In November 2007, Blue Reef announced they had acquired the Hastings-based attraction Underwater World from Hastings Heritage and would refurbish it as a Blue Reef Aquarium in time for 2008. On the same day, they also announced that they would also begin to operate Smugglers Adventure attraction nearby.

On 7 April 2008, Aspro Parks announced the purchase of Blue Reef Leisure for an undisclosed amount. The purchase was for Aspro to expand its UK offerings. On the same day, it was announced that Blue Reef would open a branch at At-Bristol in Bristol for 2009 at the former Wildwalk and IMAX Cinema sites under a 65-year lease.

== Current Venues ==
=== Newquay ===
50.4145775°N 5.084841°W

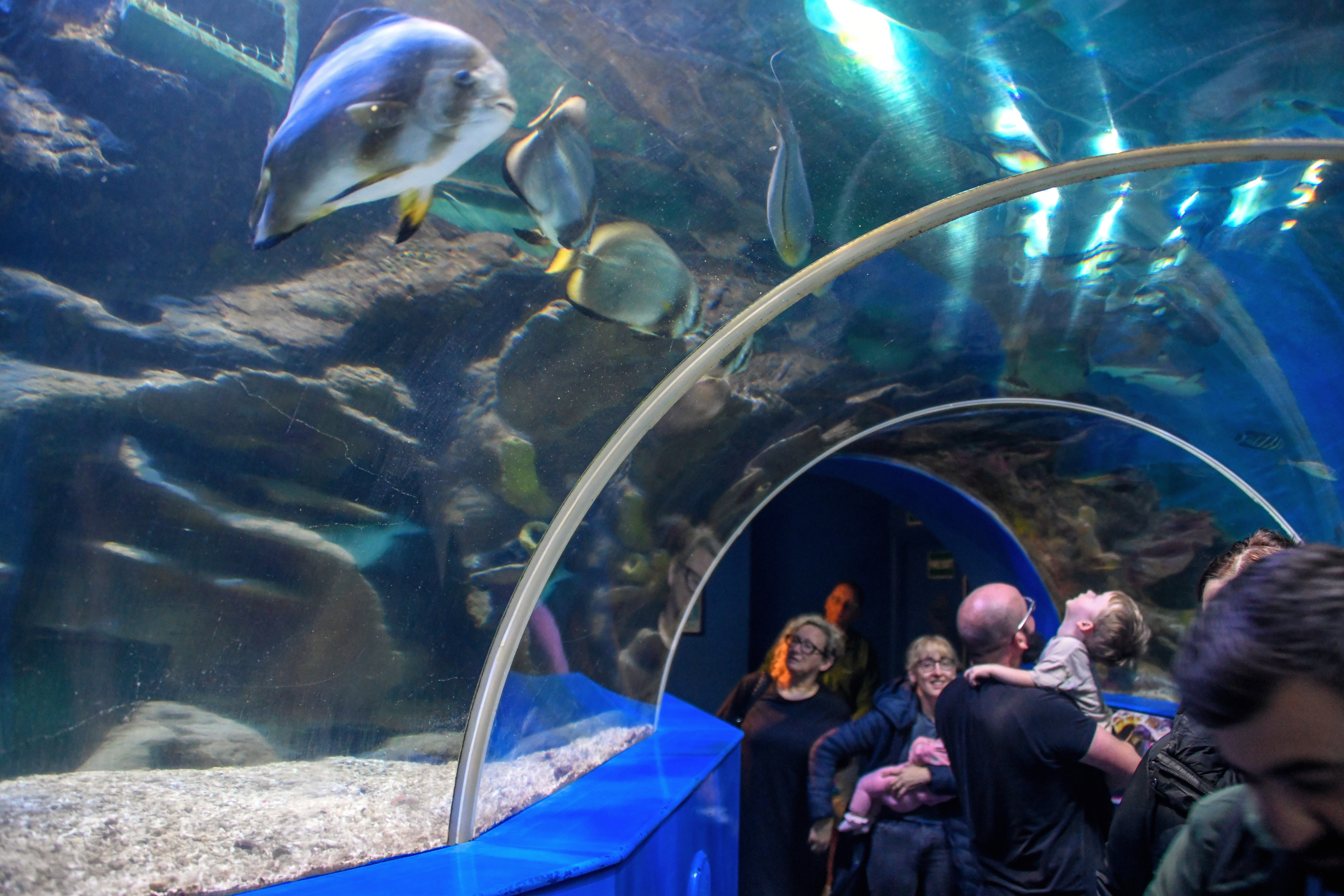
The underwater viewing tunnel at Blue Reef Aquarium Newquay

The Newquay branch is located in Newquay, England. This is the original branch that formed as part of the chain.

It is home to over 40 living displays, from tropical sharks and lobsters, to seahorses and tropical fish. At the Aquarium’s heart is a large ocean tank, where an underwater walkthrough tunnel allows visitors a closer view of the tropical coral reef fish. Other displays are home to giant Pacific octopus, triggerfish, nautilus, cuttlefish, turtles, and terrapins.

In 2008 the aquarium opened "Tropical Shark Lagoon". Themed as a mangrove lagoon, the display is home to a variety of tropical shark and ray species. The display allows for close-up views, both above and below the waterline, of stingrays, zebra sharks, blue spotted rays, and exotic fish. The display is also home to a variety of juvenile species, which use the mangrove as a nursery before moving on to the open ocean.

In 2009, a four-foot polychaete worm, nicknamed Barry, was eventually captured after months of trap laying. The polychaete worm had been damaging the coral reefs in a tank in the aquarium, in some cases ripping the coral in half. It also injured a Tang fish. As contact with the venomous bristles at the mouth of the worm can cause permanent numbness, the worm was moved into its own tank.

=== Portsmouth ===
50.7801159°N 1.0928095°W

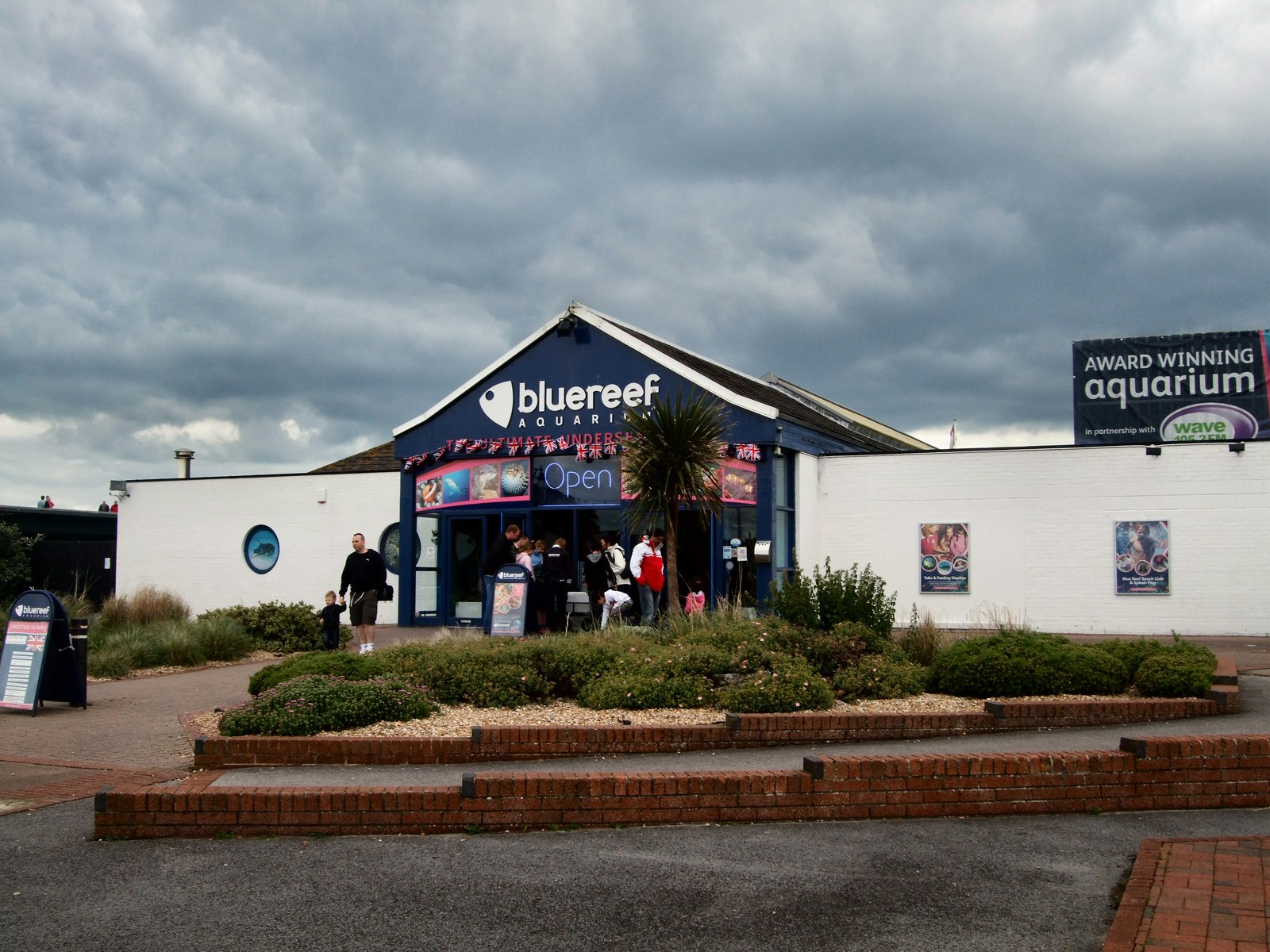
Blue Reef Aquarium, Southsea

The Portsmouth branch is located in Clarence Esplanade, Southsea, Portsmouth, England, which opened on 25 March 2002.

The aquarium has over 40 living displays, home to various species including tropical sharks, lobsters, seahorses, and tropical fish. There is a large ocean tank, where an underwater walkthrough tunnel offers close views of reef fish.

In 2007, the aquarium opened the Blue Reef Beach Club, a new outdoor activity area incorporating a wet play zone for children with fountains and giant showers.

== Former ==
These locations remain under Aspro Parks ownership but are now branded under more generic names.

=== Tynemouth ===
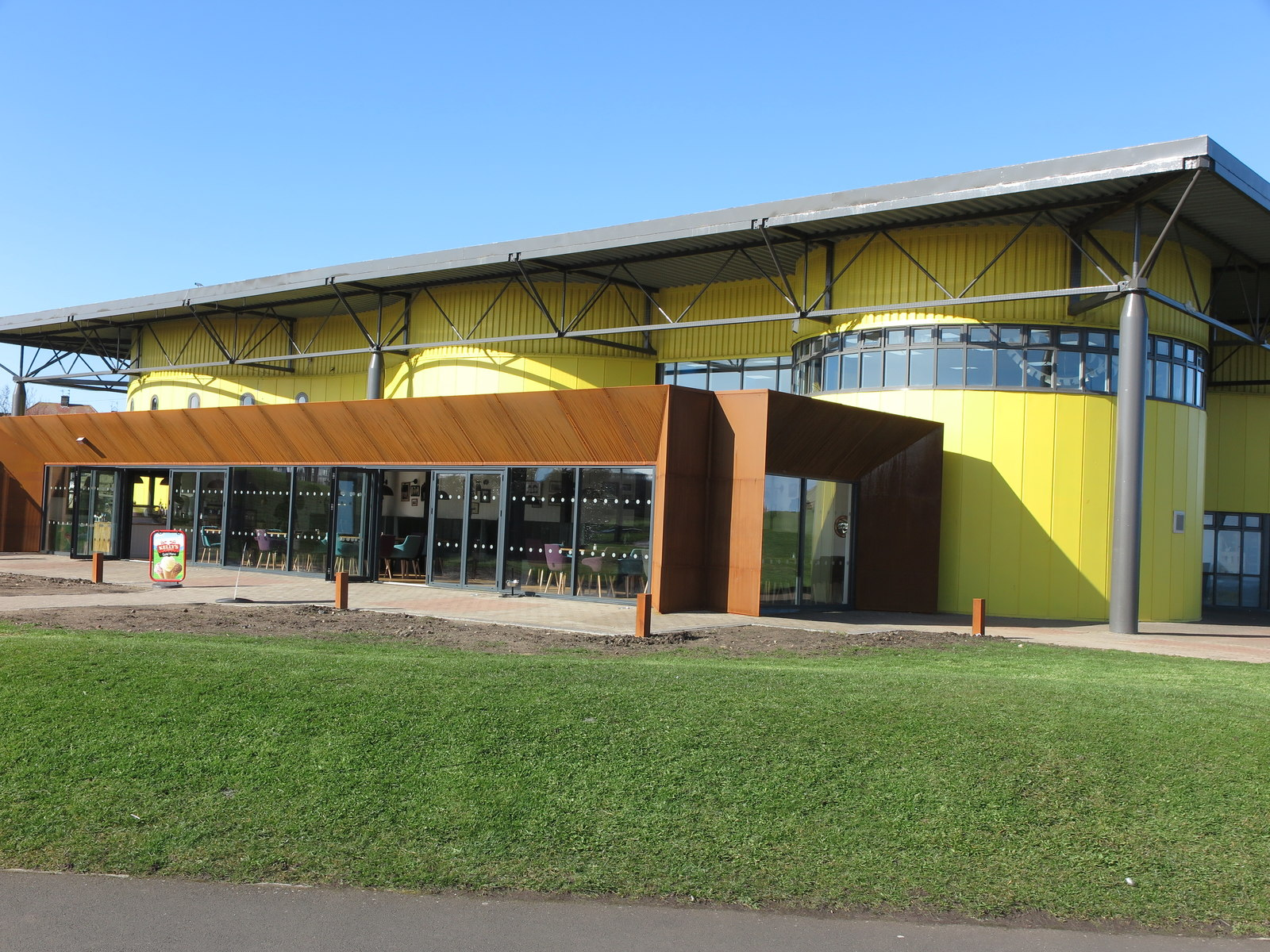
Tynemouth Aquarium entrance

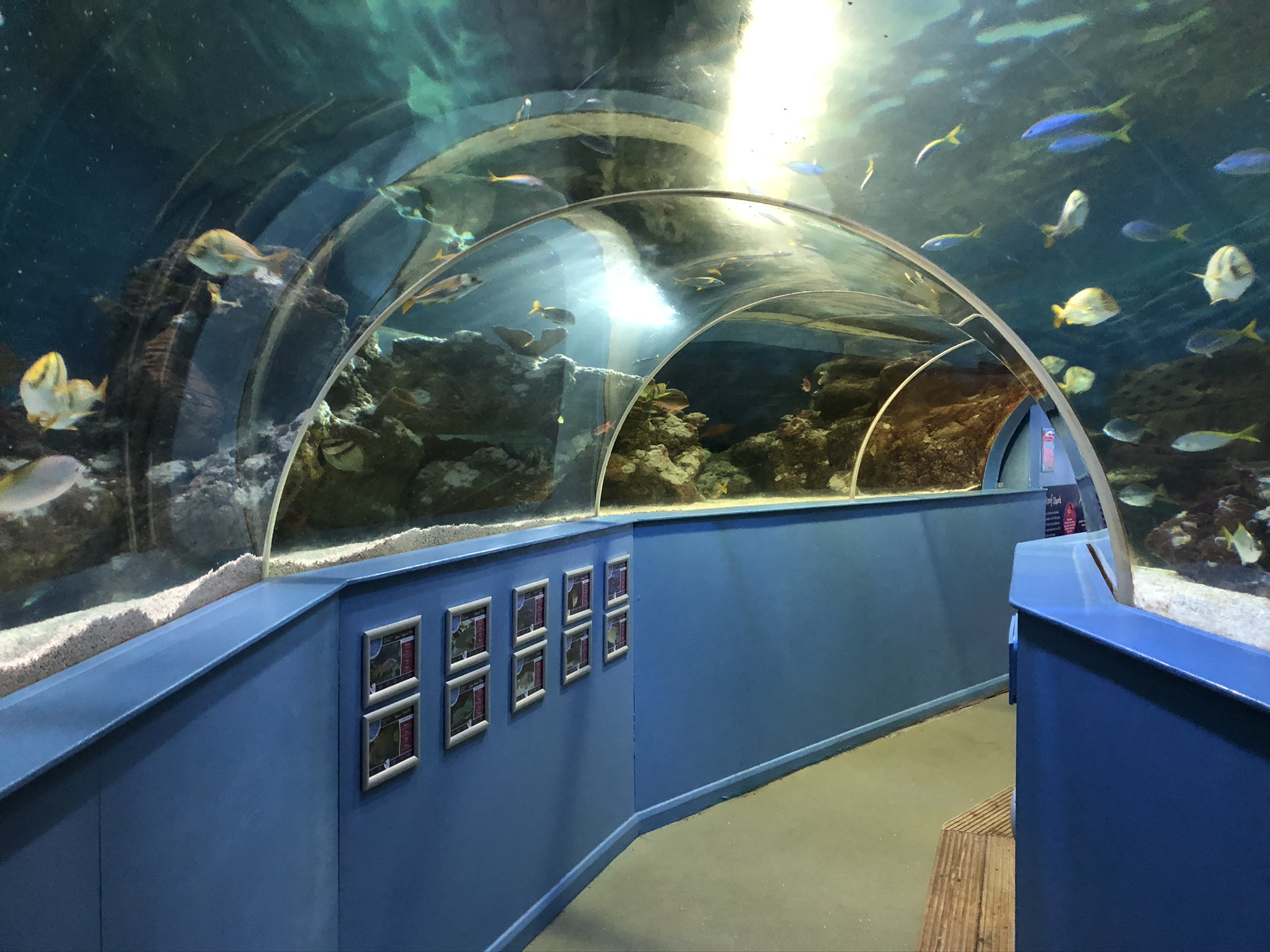
The underwater viewing tunnel at Blue Reef Aquarium in Tynemouth

55.0276839°N 1.430407°W

The Tynemouth branch is located in Tynemouth, England, and opened on February 9, 2002. It was formerly home to the Tynemouth Sea Life Aquarium.

It is home to many aquatic species, such as tropical sharks, lobsters, seahorses, and tropical fish. At the Aquarium’s heart is a large ocean tank, where an underwater walkthrough tunnel offers close encounters with the tropical coral reef fish. Other displays are home to poison dart frogs, nautilus, toxic toads, turtles, terrapins, and otters.

At Easter 2007, the aquarium opened "Seal Cove". The naturally themed 500,000-litre pool includes rocky haul-out areas, underwater caves, and other environmental enrichment features, to ensure the seals are kept in near natural conditions.

In July 2019, the aquarium was renamed the Tynemouth Aquarium.

=== Hastings ===
50.8559909°N 0.5961998°E

The Hastings branch is located in Hastings, England, and opened on 21 March 2008.

It was formerly home to Underwater World.

The centerpiece of the aquarium is the coral reef, housed within a large ocean display, with an underwater walkthrough tunnel.

In January 2021, the Aquarium went under a 12-week remodeling and reopened in the spring of 2021 as the Hastings Aquarium.

=== Bristol ===
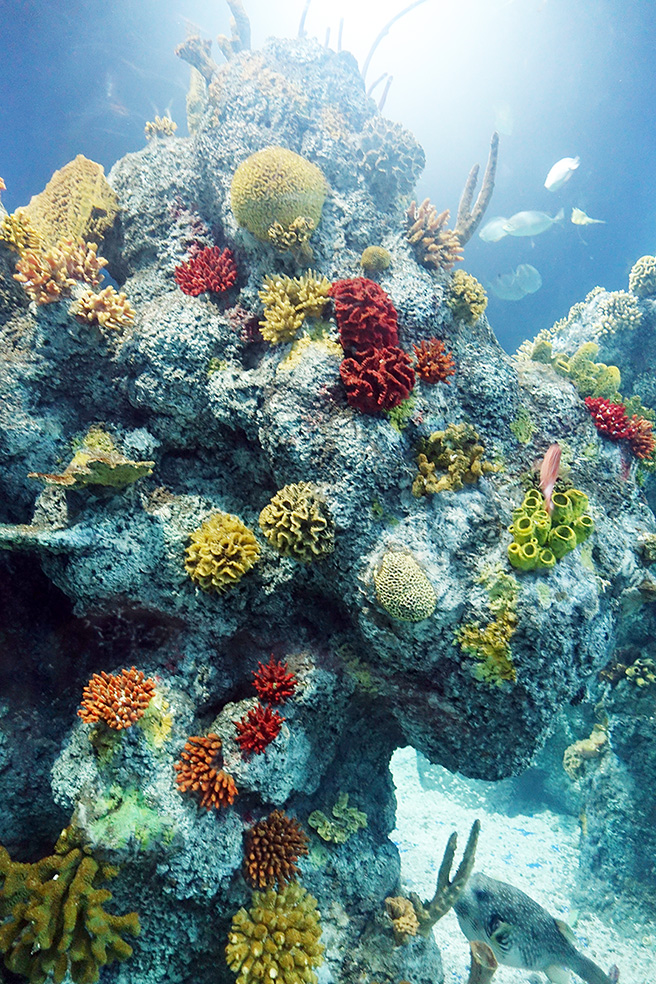
Tropical fish, Bristol Blue Reef Aquarium

51.4507488°N 2.5990722°W

The Bristol branch is located in Bristol, England, and opened in November 2009. It is located at the We the Curious science complex, in the former Wildwalk and IMAX Cinema buildings, which had closed in 2007 due to poor attendance. In 2010, shortly after opening, the venue was renamed as the Bristol Aquarium to better represent the location it is housed in.

The aquarium is home to over 40 living displays which include tropical sharks, lobsters, seahorses and tropical fish. At the Aquarium’s heart is a large ocean tank, where an underwater walkthrough tunnel offers close encounters with the tropical coral reef fish. Other displays are home to octopuses, puffer fish, electric eels, tropical sharks, terrapins, and giant Amazon river fish. It is the only aquarium in the UK to feature a giant botanical house, home to hundreds of species of plants and flowers from around the world.

The former IMAX space was retained as a cinema, which showcased various wildlife and nature films. However, in November 2011, the aquarium announced they would stop showcasing movies, although the space is still used for venue hire events.

==== Gallery ====
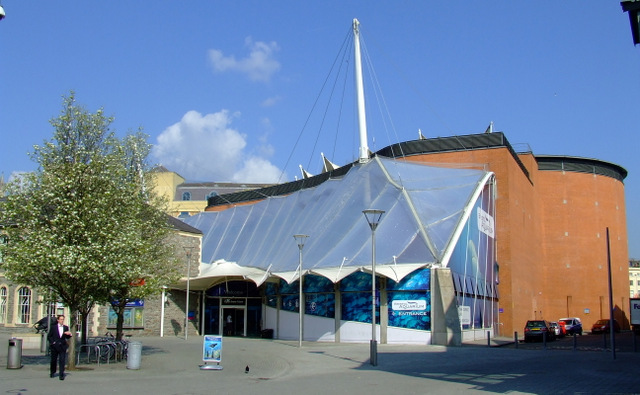
External view

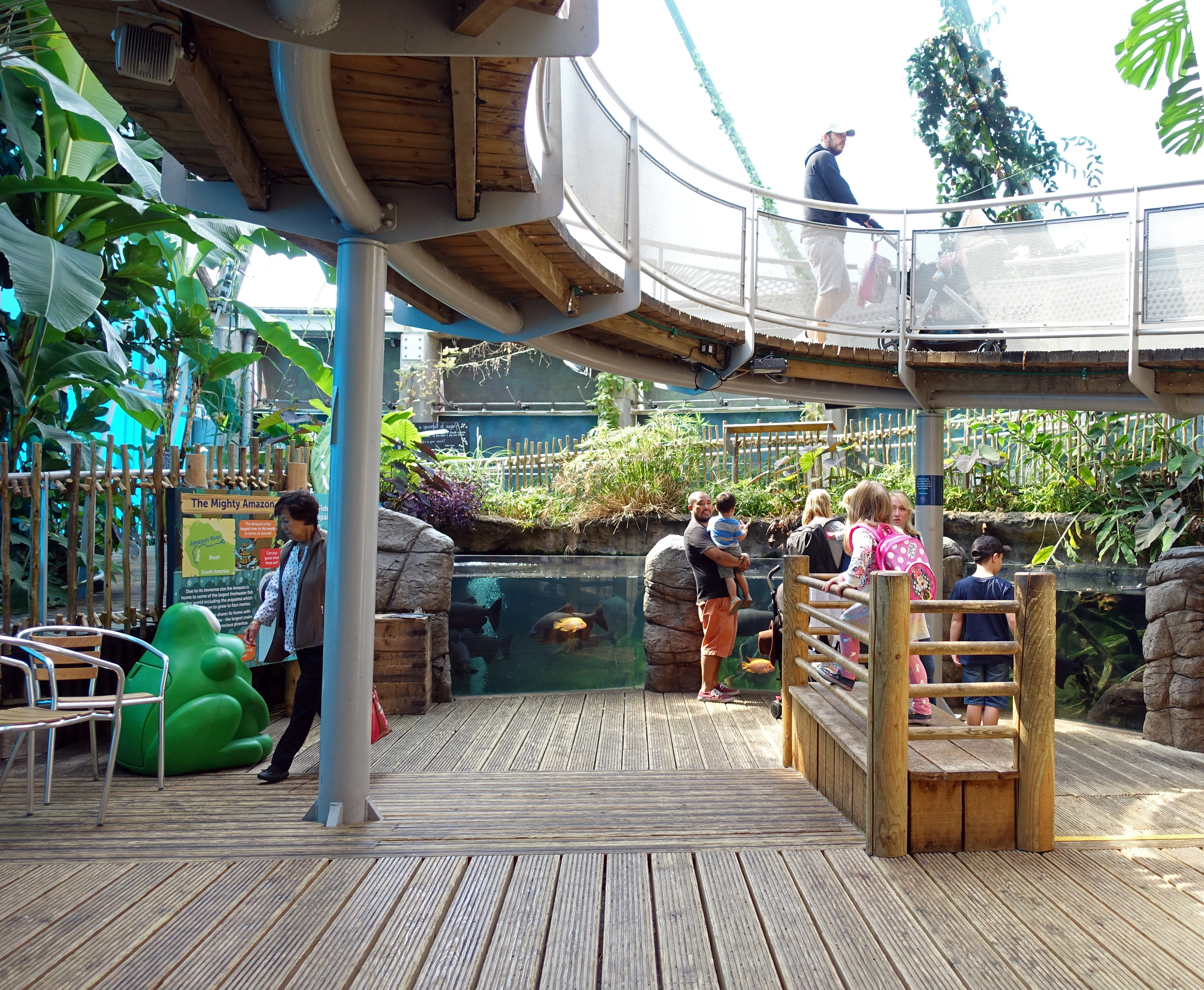
Interior view

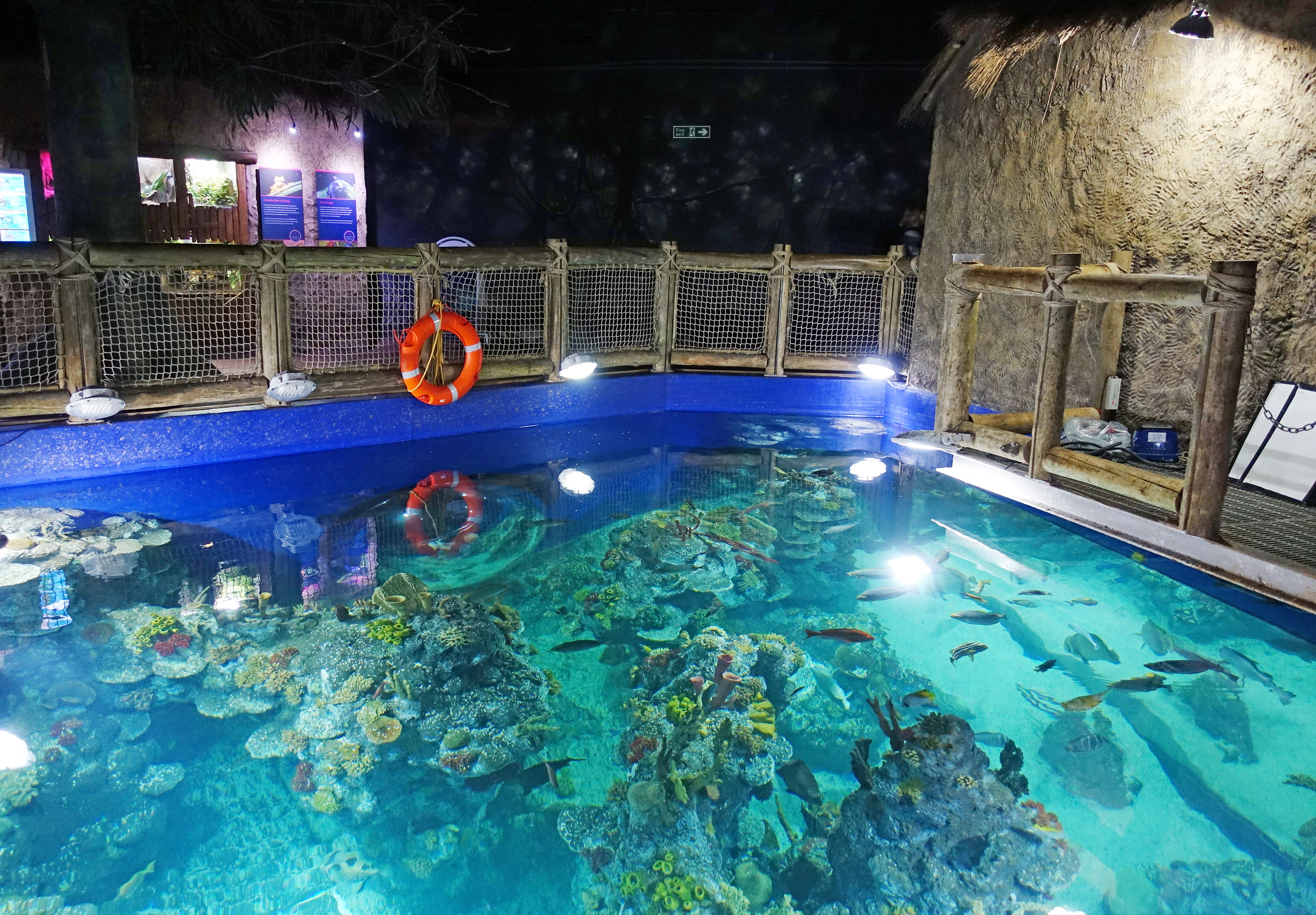
Fish tank and viewing walk

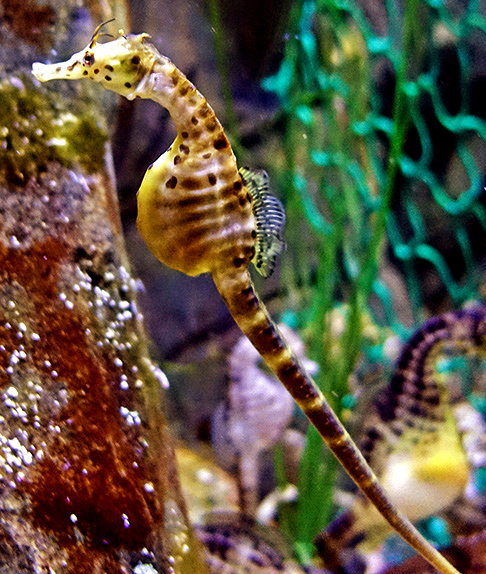
Seahorse
