= Wasalandia =

Former theme park in Vaasa, Finland

- Interactive map of Wasalandia
- Location: Huvipuisto Wasalandia, Vaskiluoto, 65100 Vaasa, Finland
- Coordinates: 63.090529°N 21.586375°E
- Status: Defunct
- Opened: 1988
- Closed: 2015
- Owner: Aspro Parks
- Operating season: June to August

Attractions
- Total: 28
- Roller coasters: 3
- Website: www.wasalandia.fi

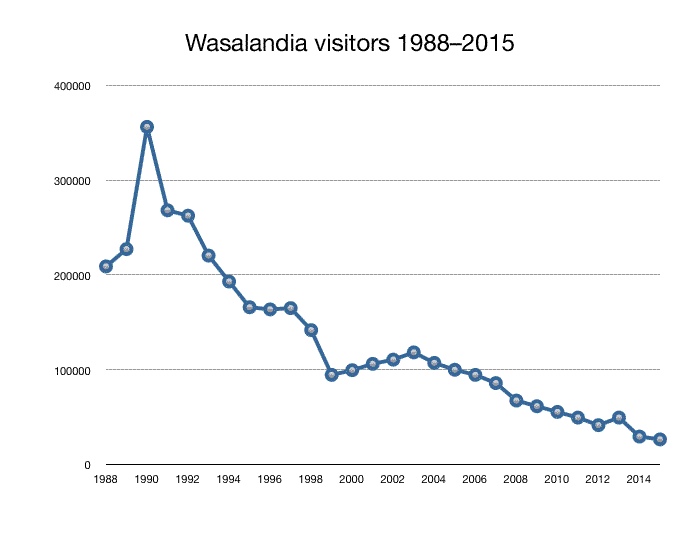
Wasalandia's visitor number peaked in 1990 which then declined to 26,000 visitors by the end of last summer in 2015

Wasalandia Amusement Park was an amusement park in Vaasa, Finland. It opened in 1988 and closed after summer 2015. It offered up to 28 rides for the whole family. The park was owned by Puuharyhmä Oyj (formerly Tervakosken Puuhamaa Oy) until 2007. In its last years, Wasalandia was owned by the Spanish company Aspro Ocio, S.A.

Wasalandia was located on the island Vaskiluoto some 3 kilometres from downtown Vaasa. The indoor waterpark Tropiclandia located nearby continued its operations.

Trafficland

Name	Ride type	Limits
Traffic Park	Mini cars	Min 100 cm
Pedal Cars	Bikecars	Min 120 cm
Mini Mopeds	Mini mopeds	No limits

Pirateland

Name	Ride type	Limits
Light House Tower	Free fall	Min 120 cm
Pirate Ship		Min 120 cm
Pirate Adventure Track		No limits
Rio Grande	Mini train	Max 50 kg
Crocodile Boats	Boats	Min 120 cm
Giant Slide	Slide	Max 100 cm
Tube Labyrint	Labyrint	No limits
Poolboats	Boats	No limits

Jumping and Climbingland

Name	Ride type	Limits
Jumping Mattresses	Trampoline	No limits
Giant Trampolines	Trampoline	No limits
Climbing World	Big play unit	No limits

Wild West

Name	Ride type	Limits
Water Rafting Ride	Rollercoaster (Water)	Min 120 cm
Rocking Tug		Min 100 cm
Car Track		Min 120 cm
Tivoliland	Tivoli	No limits

Funfairland

Name	Ride type	Limits
Horse Carousel	Carousel	Min 100 cm
Mini Wonderwheel	Wonderwheel	Max 140 cm
Rocking Tea	Teacups	Max 60 kg
Speedy Sleigh		Min 120 cm
Spooky House	Ghosthouse	9 years old
Small Carousel	Carousel	Max 60 kg
Ladybird		Max 140 cm
Small Pirate Boat	Boats	Max 140 cm

3D Movie theatre with moving seats was located in the Wild West section of the Wasalandia park. The park also featured two restaurants and kiosks, and a souvenir and snack shop.
