= Deep Sea World =

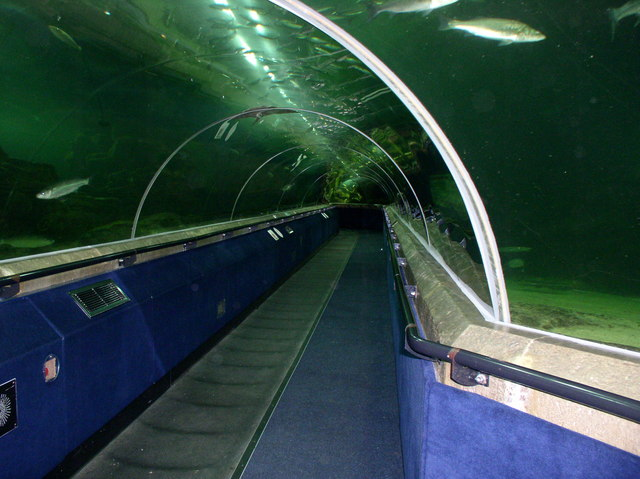
- Underwater tunnel at Deep Sea World (May 2004)
- Interactive map of Deep Sea World
- 56.0082°N 3.3909°W
- Date opened: 9 April 1993
- Location: North Queensferry, Fife, Scotland
- Volume of largest tank: 1,000,000 imp gal (4,500,000 L; 1,200,000 US gal)
- Owner: Aspro Parks
- Website: www.deepseaworld.com

Deep Sea World is an aquarium located in the village of North Queensferry in Fife, Scotland. It is host to a collection of large sand tiger sharks, also known as ragged toothed sharks or grey nurse sharks, and various other species of shark.

== History ==
The aquarium opened on 9 April 1993 in the site of the disused Battery Quarry, below the Forth Rail Bridge. It is owned and operated by the Spanish Aspro Ocio Group, who also run the Blue Planet Aquarium in England and many other aquaria in Europe.

== Exhibits ==
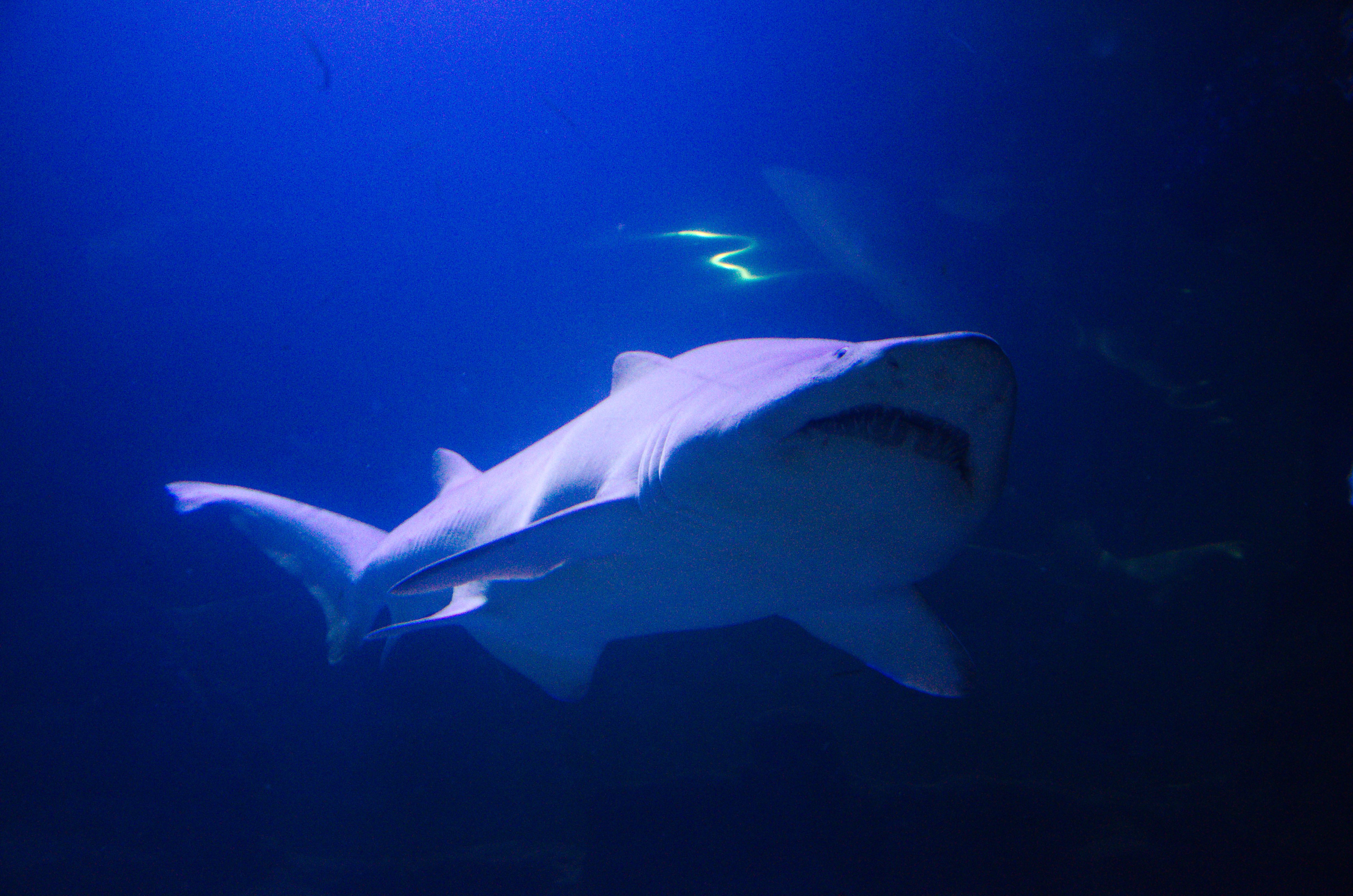
A shark at Deep Sea World

One of the main attractions is the 112 m (367 ft) long transparent acrylic underwater viewing tunnel, which is one of the longest of its kind in the world. The curvature of the 6.5-centimetre (2.6 in) thick acrylic causes a de-magnifying effect on all of the creatures in the exhibit—roughly one third reduction. The tank with the tunnel contains 1,000,000 imperial gallons (4,500,000 L; 1,200,000 US gal) of sea water pumped in from the River Forth. This water is generally around 14 °C (57 °F), but varies with the season. Because of the low temperature most animals within the tunnel are from around Britain. Sand tiger sharks are generally found in warmer water, for example Florida, US and South Africa. They easily adapt to the change in temperature, but the lower temperature reduces the rate of metabolism.

The aquarium also displays various tanks and rock pools containing exotic fish and other sea animals.

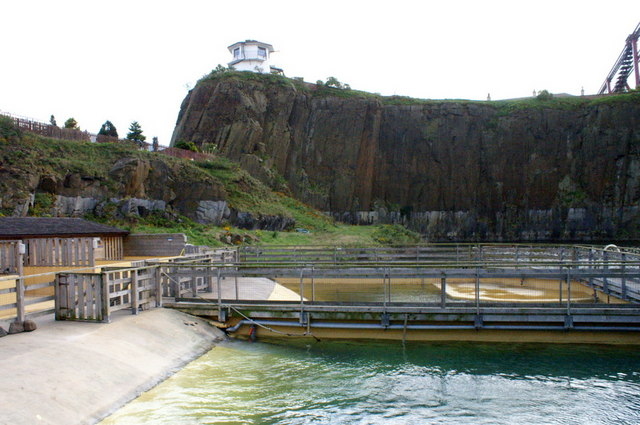
Seal pens at Deep Sea World.

In 2005, the aquarium opened a new seal enclosure which houses resident seals as well as injured ones rescued by the SSPCA.
