= Palmitos Park =

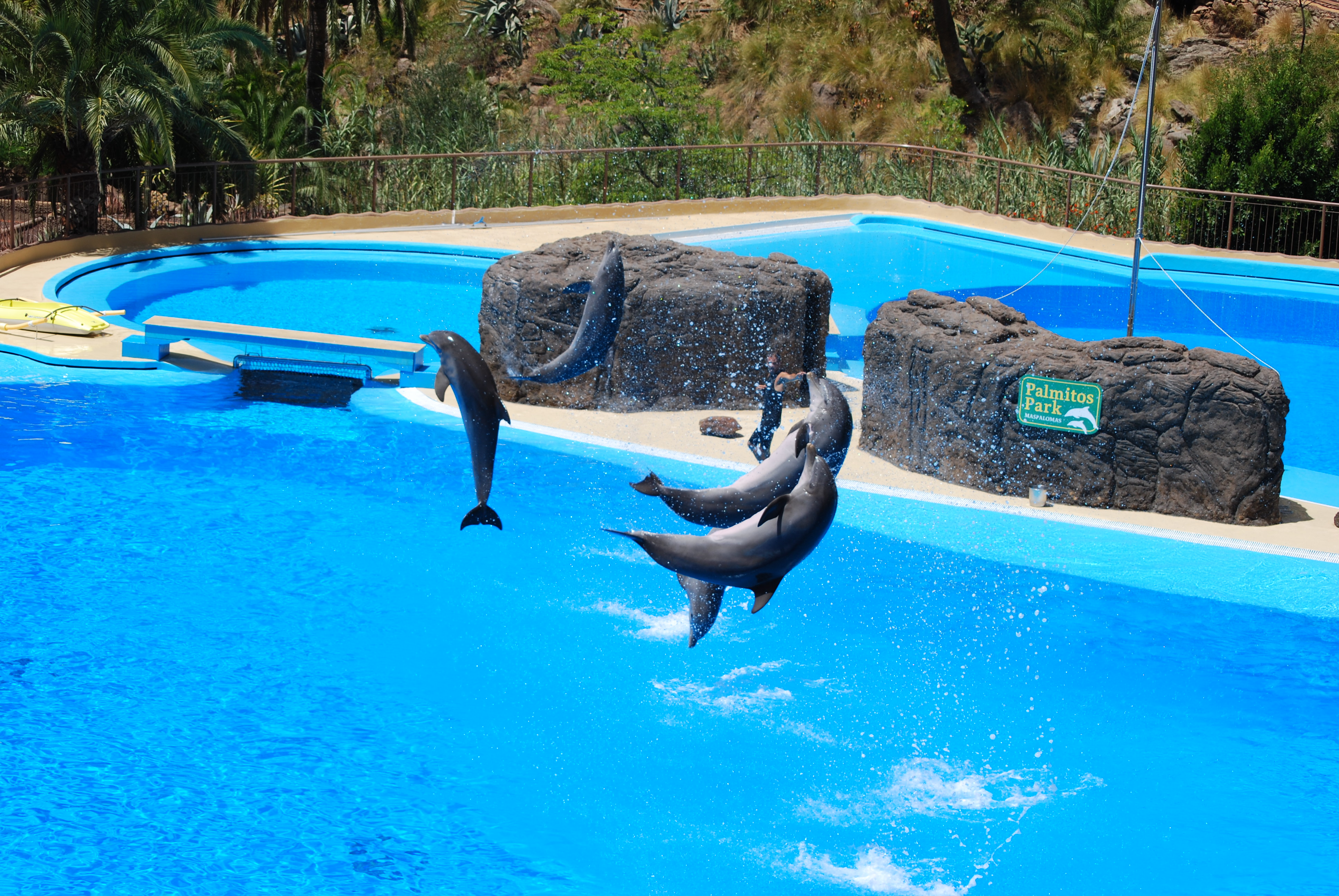
- Interactive map of Palmitos Park
- 27.833621°N 15.617162°W
- Date opened: 1978; Re-opened: 2008
- Location: Gran Canaria, Spain
- Land area: 49 acres
- No. of species: Cacti: 160; Palm trees: 42; Birds: 230
- Major exhibits: Dolphins, birds of prey, eagles, owls, reptiles, gibbons, meerkats, exotic birds, aquarium
- Owner: Aspro Parks
- Website: www.palmitospark.es (in Spanish)

Palmitos Park is a 20-hectare (49-acre) botanical garden, aviary and zoo on the island of Gran Canaria, Canary Islands, Spain.

== Geography & climate ==
The park is located in a countryside area, near Pilancones Natural Park, towards south of the island; about 10 kilometres (6.2 mi) north of the tourist beaches and dunes of Maspalomas, but towards the interior. The park has a humid subtropical climate.

== Layout ==
There is a terrace near a fountain, along a path that leads up to the amphitheater where flying birds of prey perform in shows. Next to the amphitheater there is a snack bar, and a small cafe can be found in the park.

One feature of the park is the great wealth of cacti and succulents. There are over 160 different cactus types, and 1000 palm trees of 42 different types.

Parrot-like birds are well represented in the park, but other types of birds can also be found, including swans and ducks. Overall, there are over 1,500 exotic birds of 230 different species. Many fly freely around the park.

Palmitos Park holds Europe's largest butterfly venue, as well as the biggest Orchid collection on the island.

Near the exit - behind the souvenir shop, one can admire hummingbirds that fly very visibly in front of their food.

== Sections of the park ==
- Butterfly house with (mainly living) butterflies.
- Pond with water birds
- Dolphinarium with 6 dolphins, and live dolphin shows interacting with the audience.
- Dolphin Photo Opportunity where members of the public can have their photo taken while stroking a dolphin (additional fee)
- Swim with Dolphins opportunity (additional fee)
- Glass cages with hummingbirds
- House of orchids
- Terrace near fountain
- Amphitheater with shows with flying birds of prey
- Presentation room with documentaries and shows with trained parrots
- Souvenir shop
- Aquaria with many kinds of fish and other underwater animals

== Gallery ==
Hover over each photo to view label detail

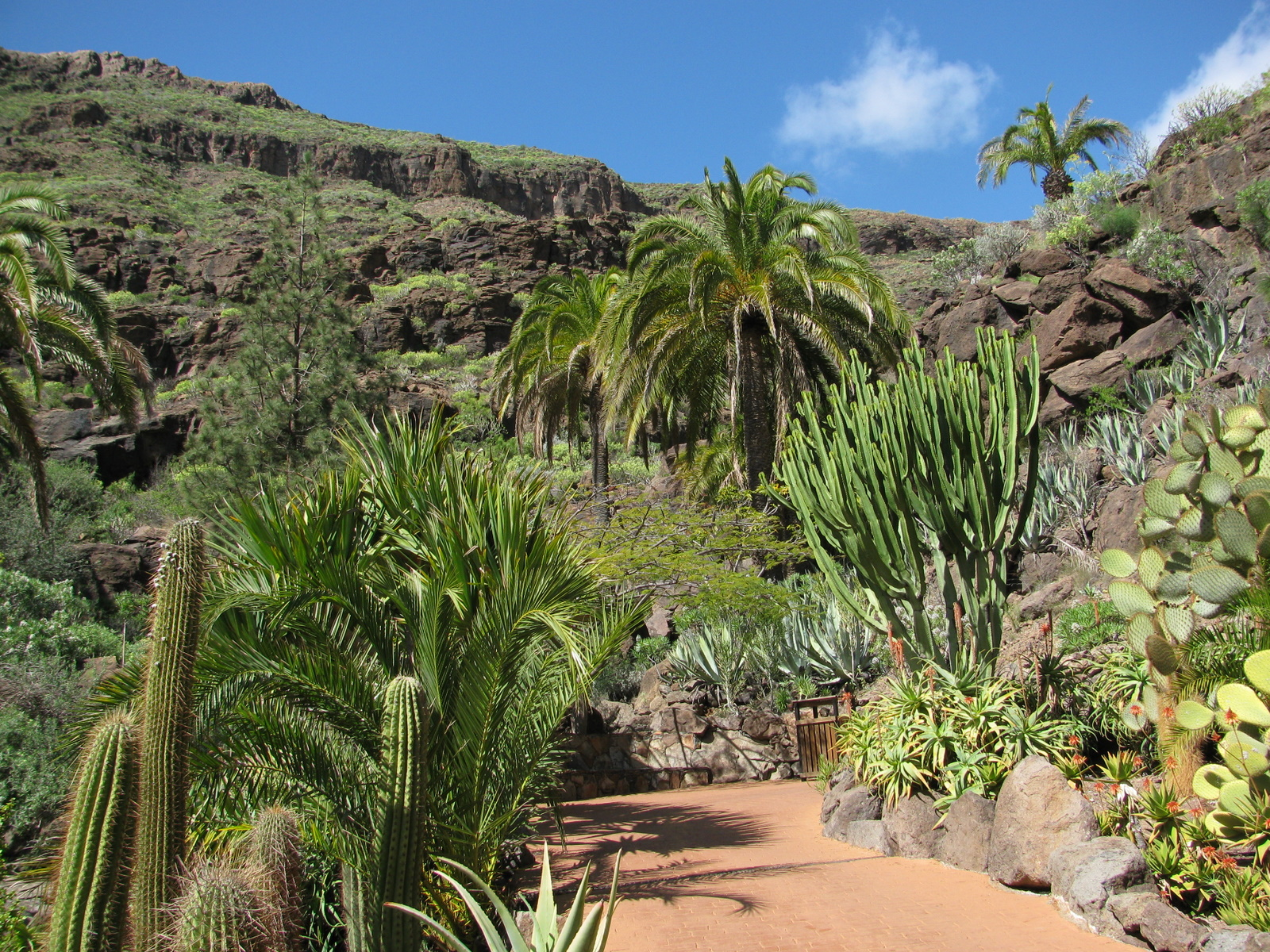
Variety of plants in Palmitos Park

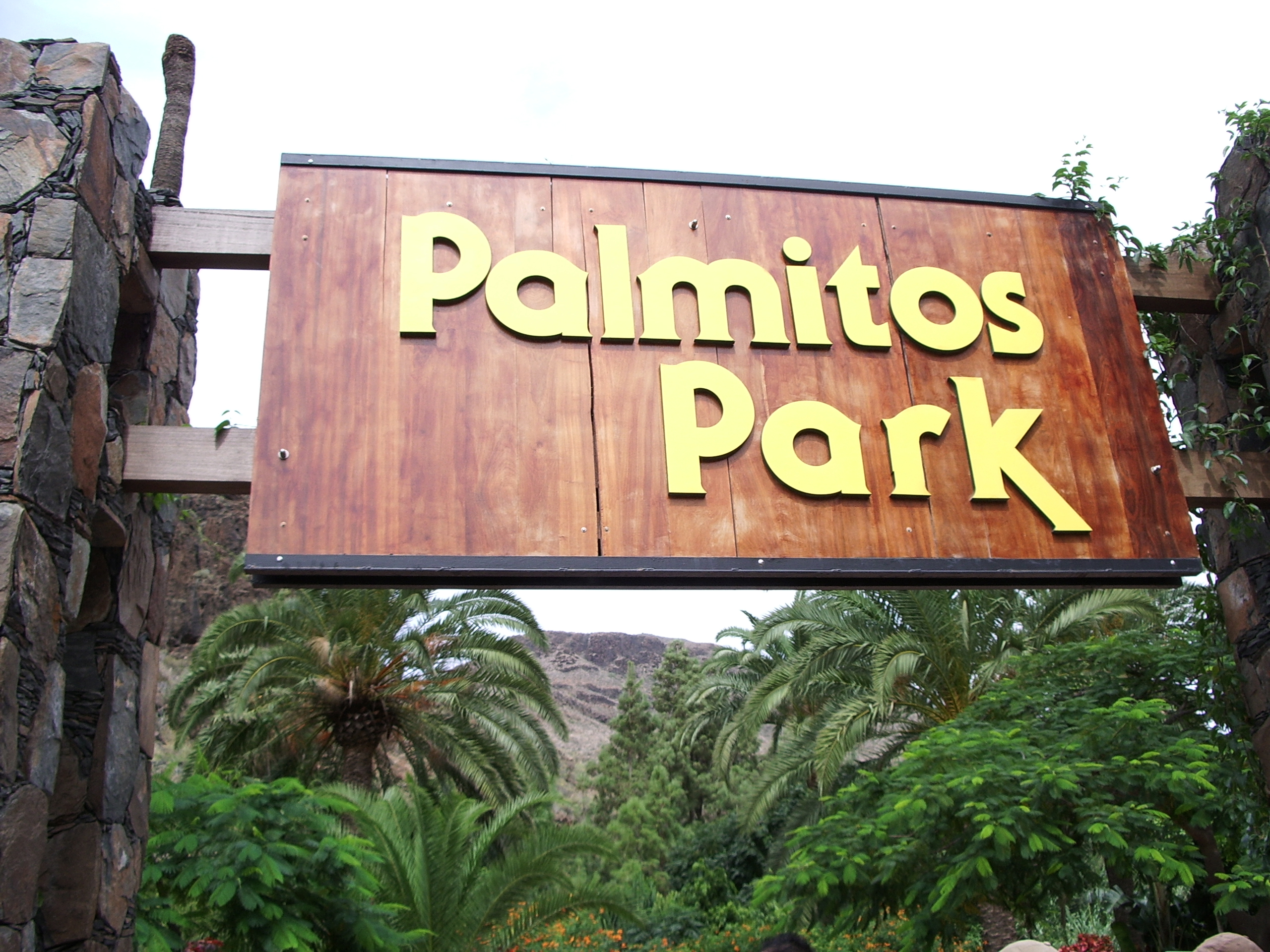
The entrance in 2006, shortly before the fire that destroyed the park

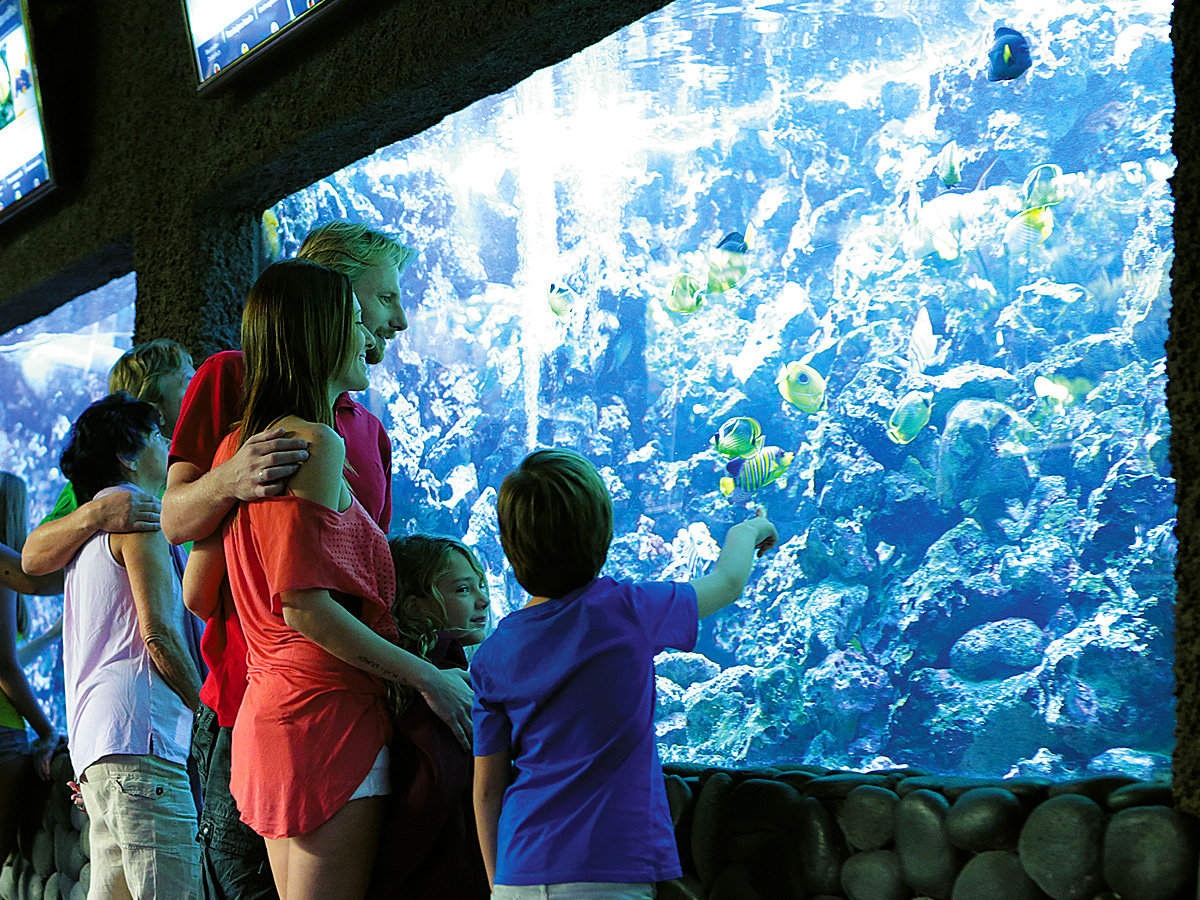
Tourists watching fish in the aquarium

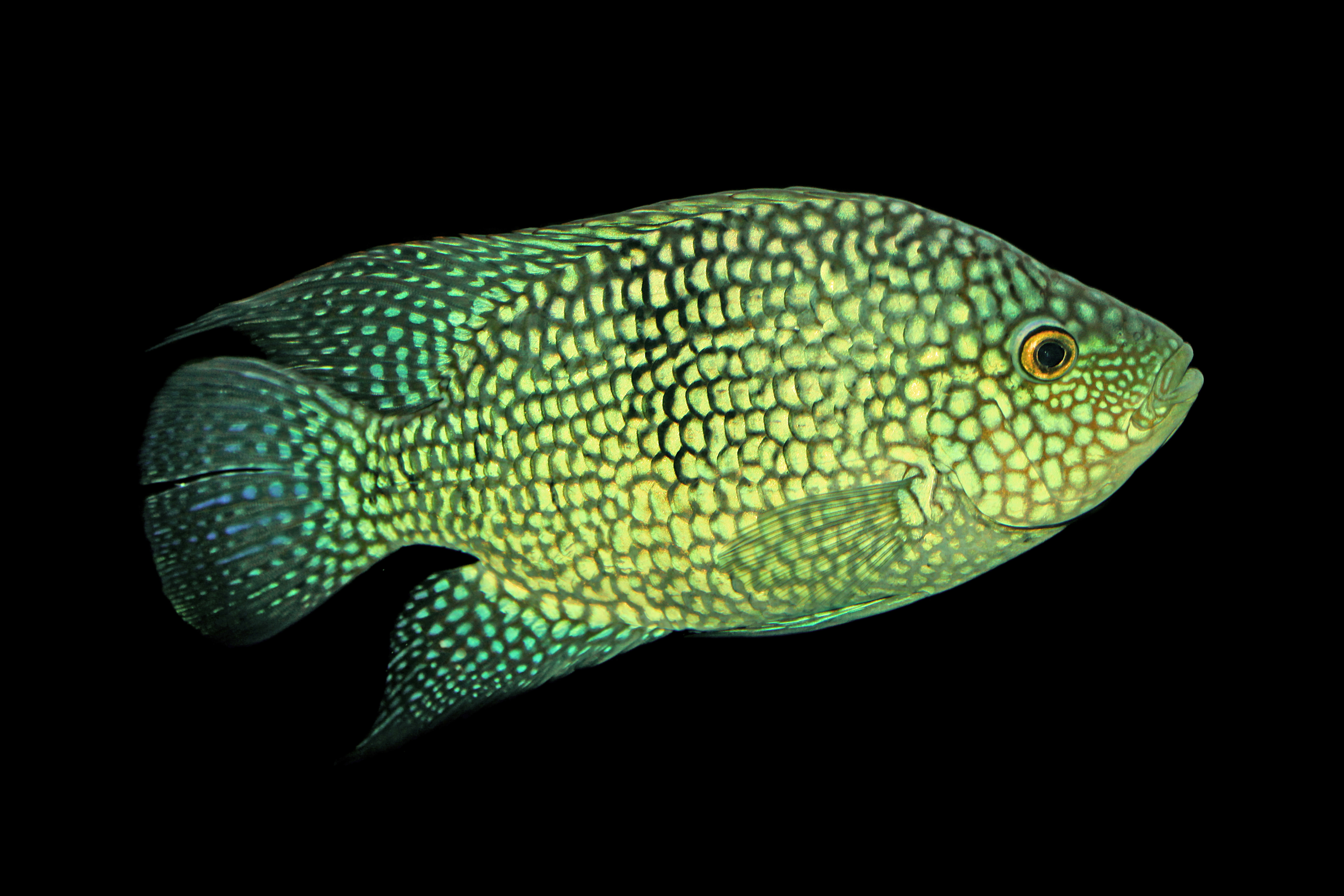
A herichthys carpintis fish at Palmitos Park

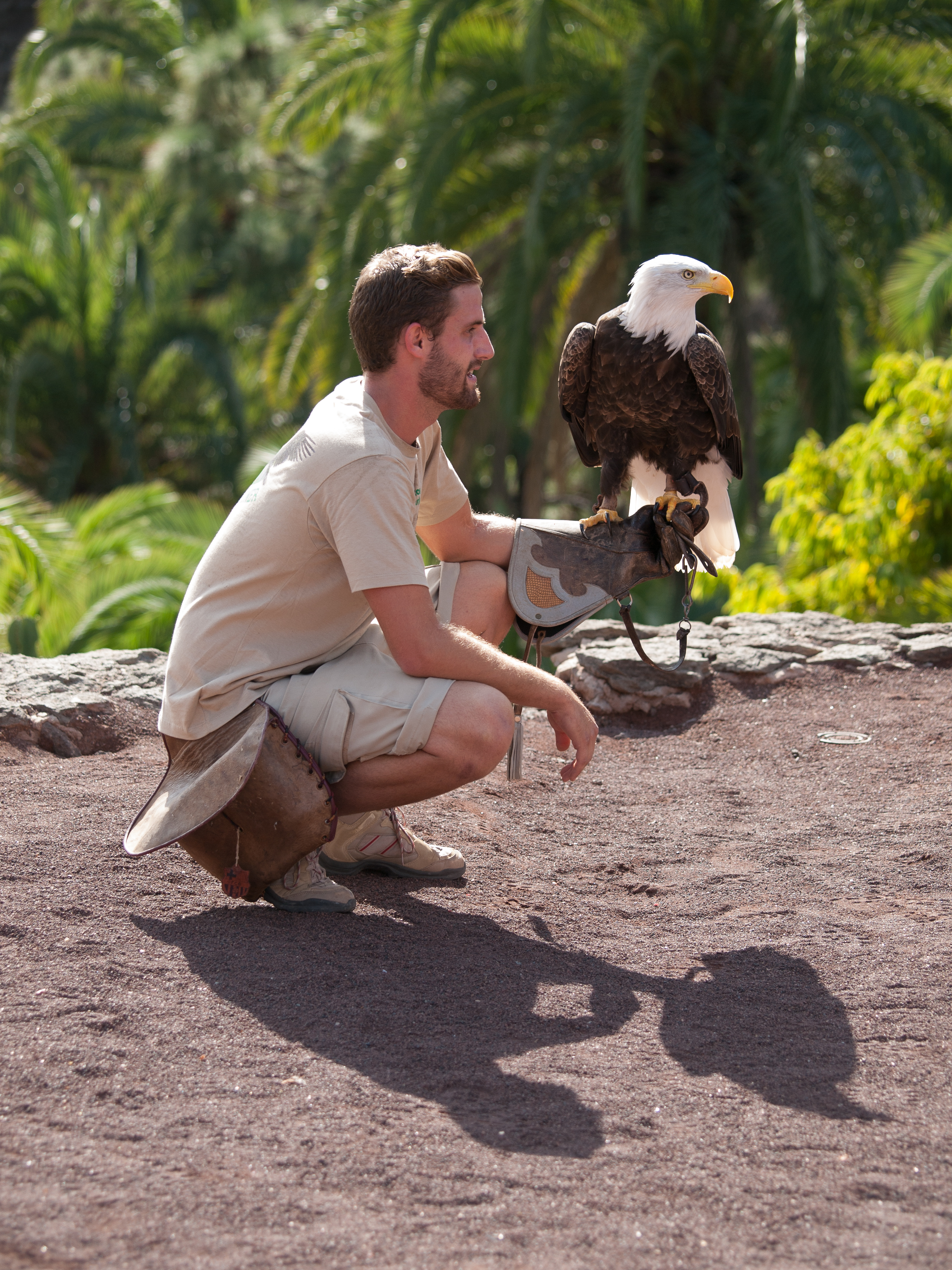
A bald eagle during a show

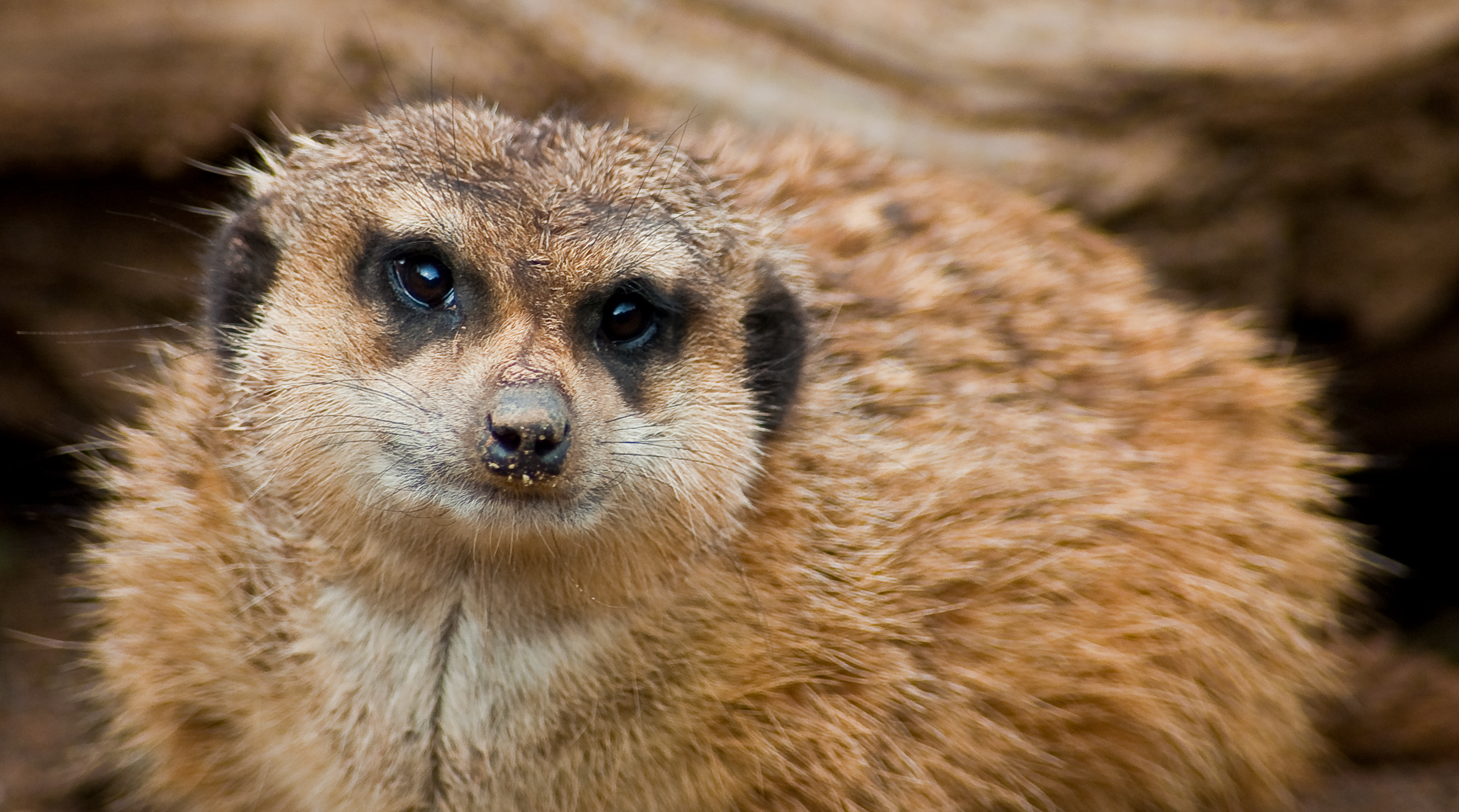
A meerkat at Palmitos Park

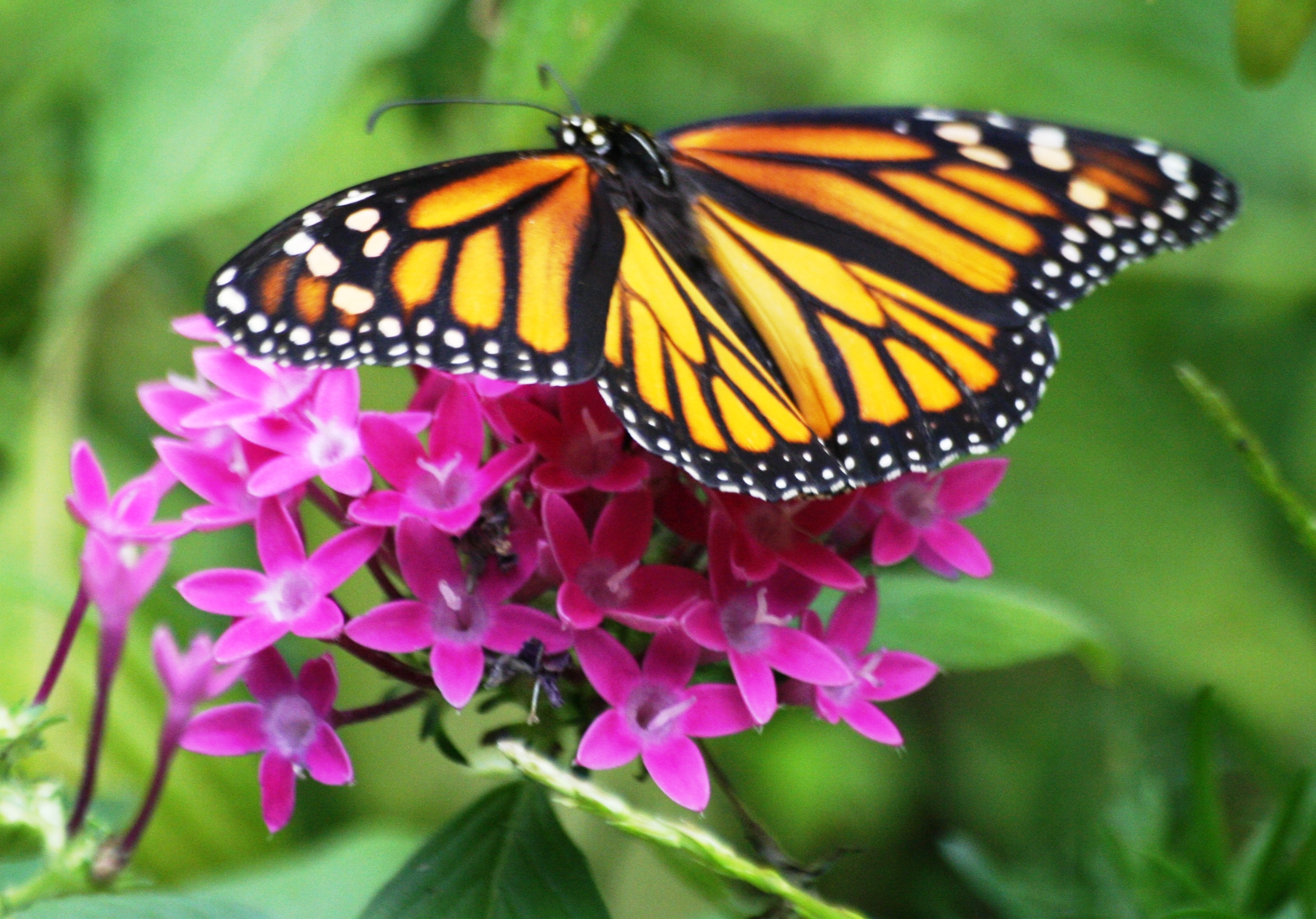
A monarch butterfly in the Butterfly House

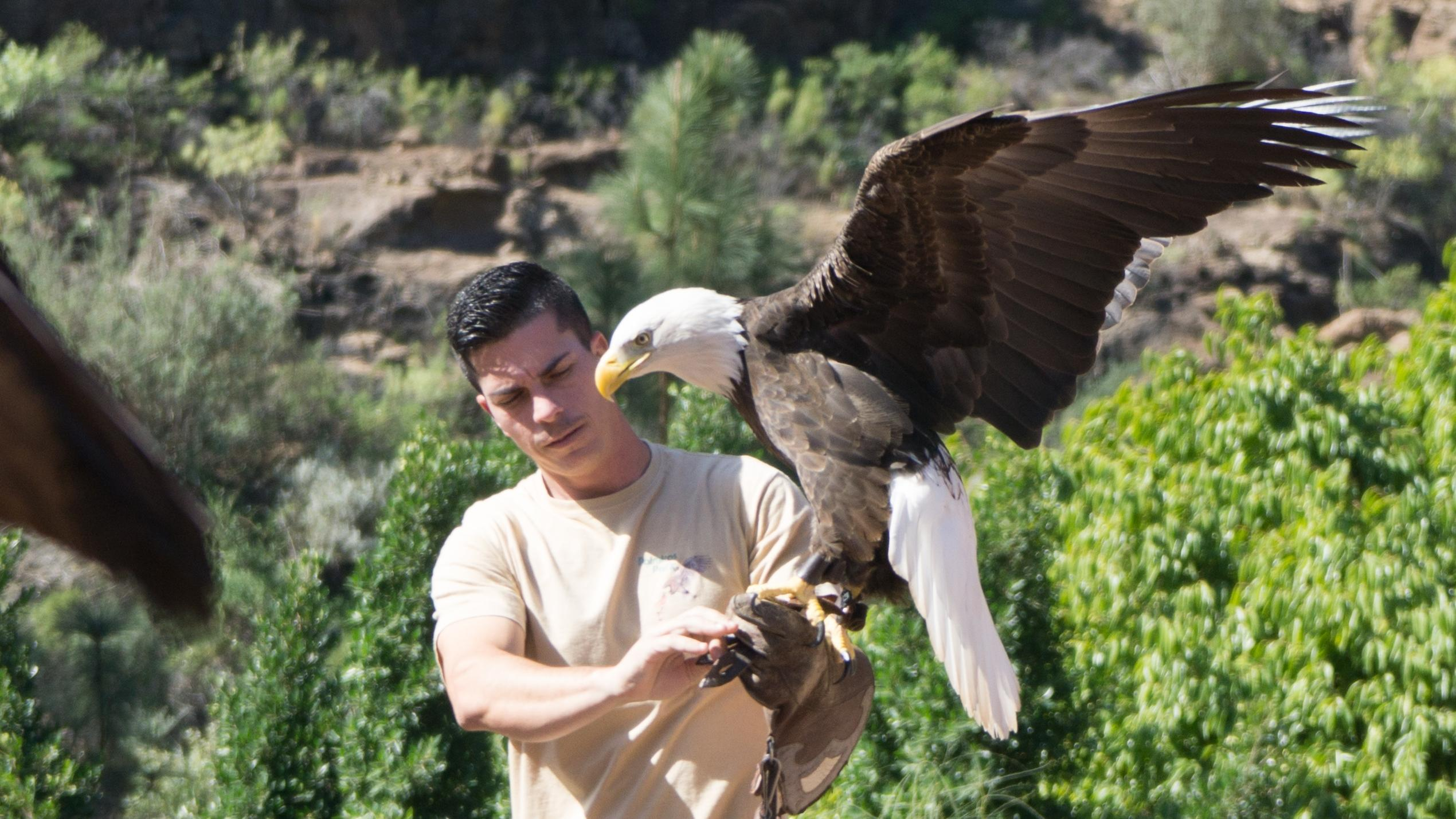
A birds of prey display

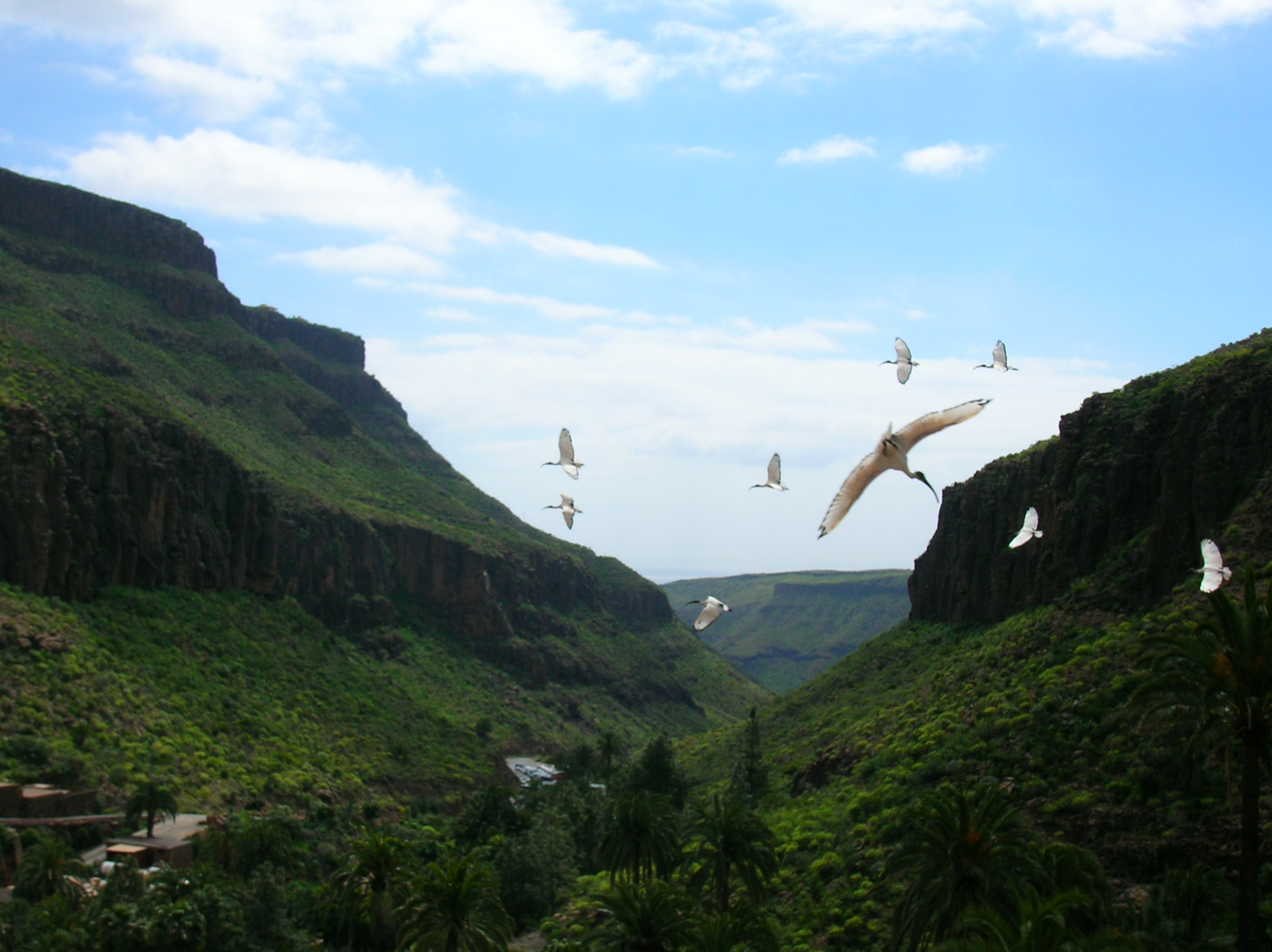
A bird show in progress at Palmitos Park

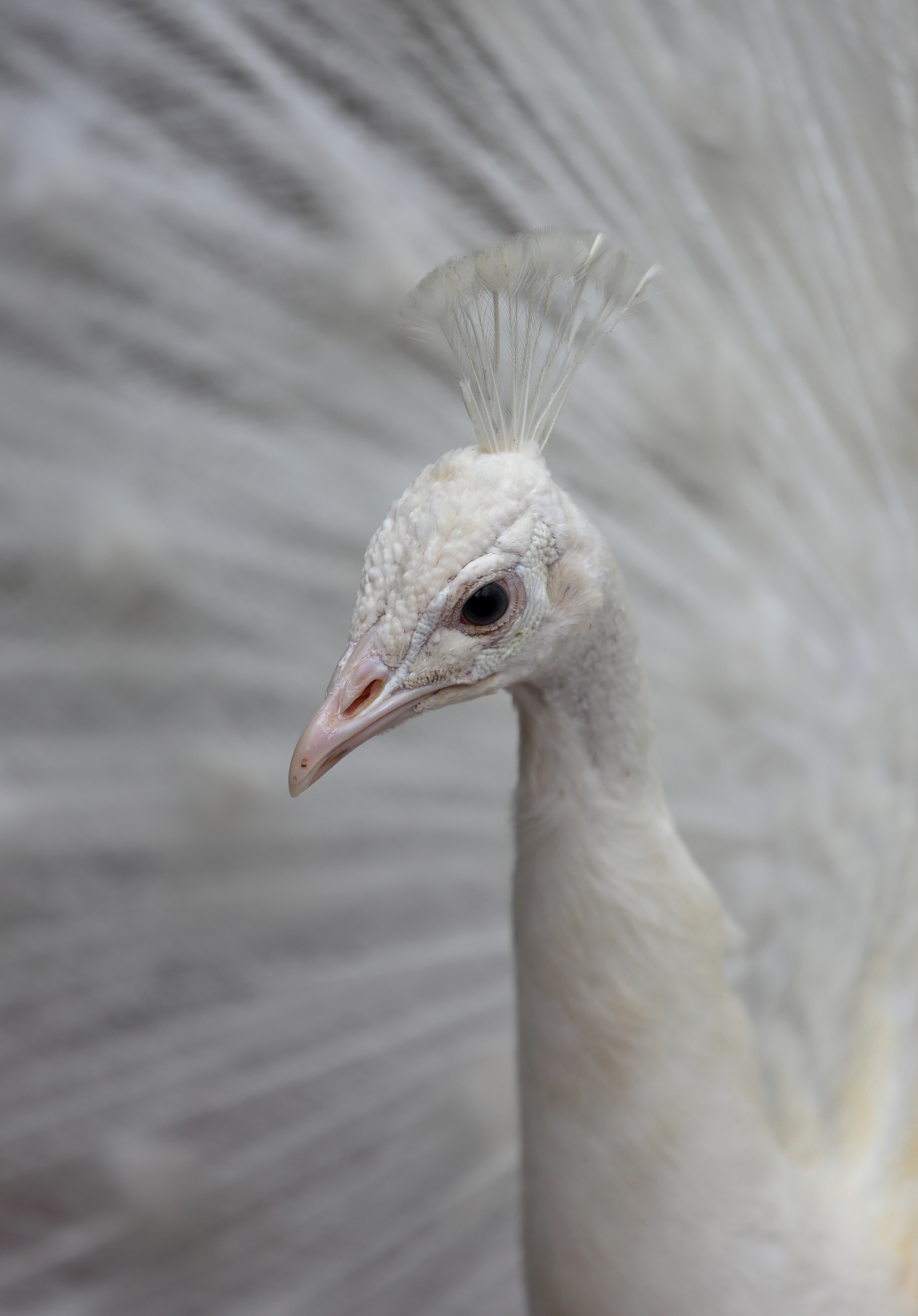
White Peacock

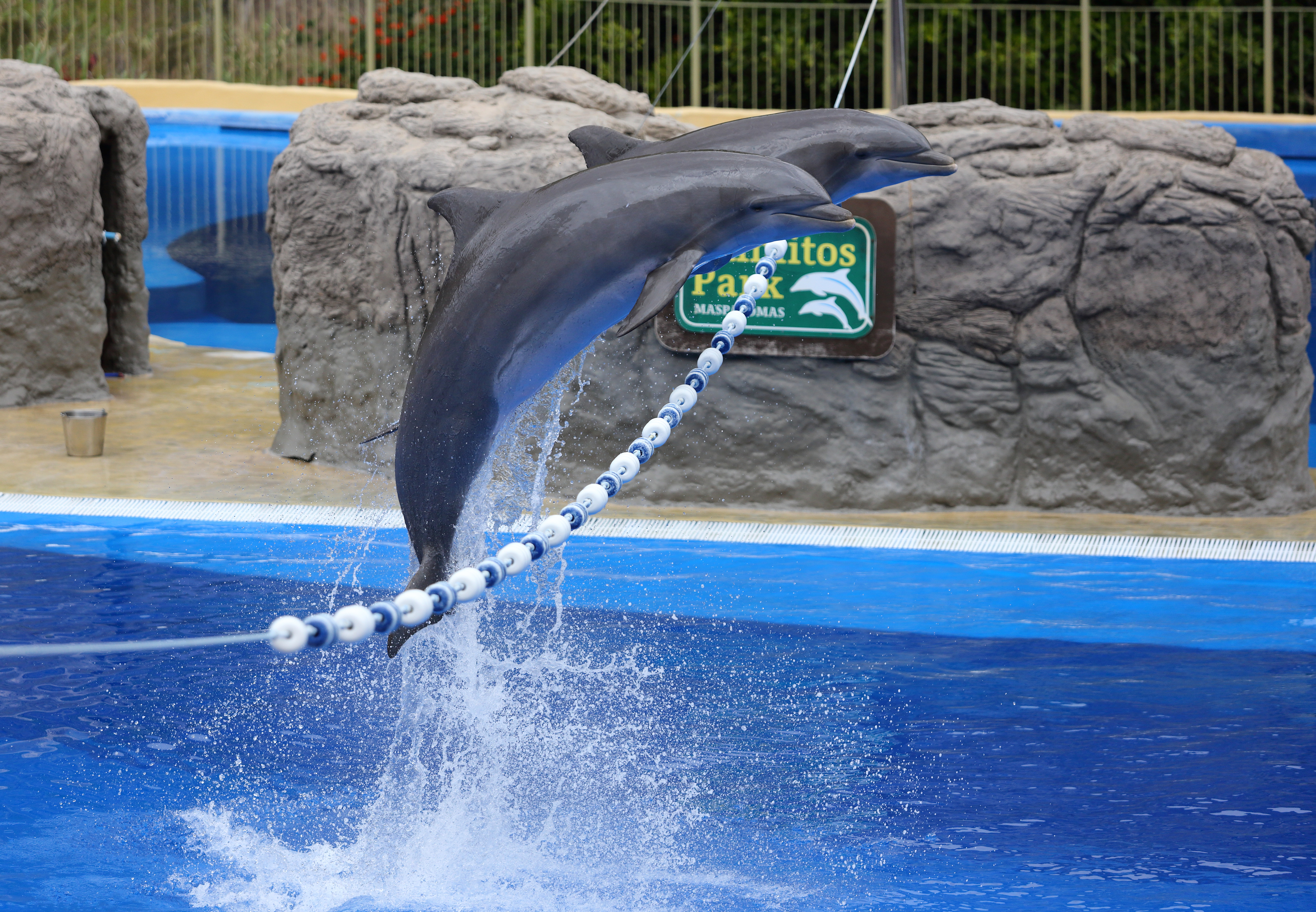
The Dolphin Show

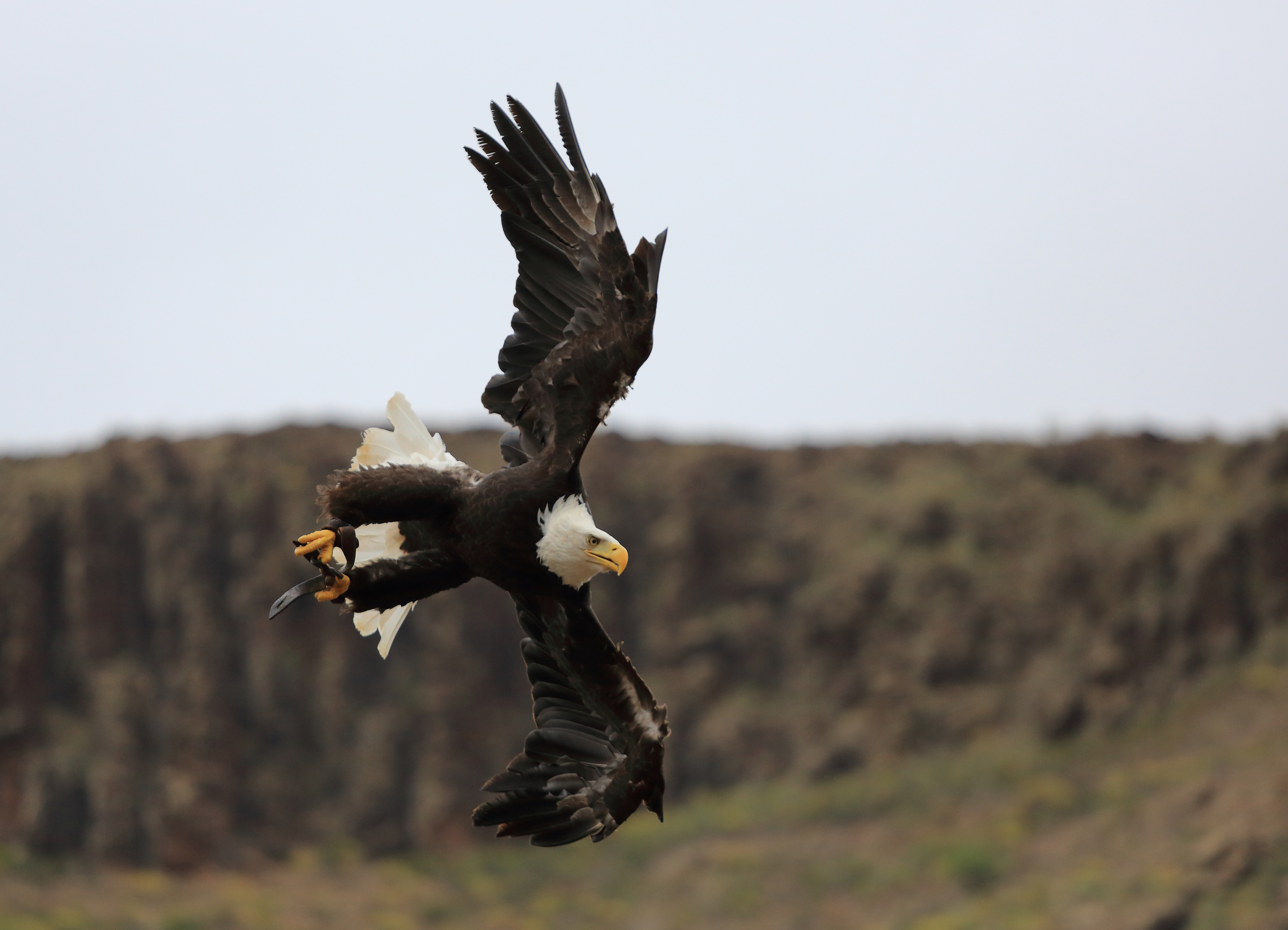
Bald Eagle in flight

== 2007 Gran Canaria forest fires ==
On July 31, 2007 it was reported in the media that almost 65% of the park was burned due to ten forest fires, and that some exotic bird species - such as the toucan - may have been killed. The forest fires caused evacuations of certain parts of Gran Canaria and Tenerife. A local Forest Ranger was accused of starting the fires intentionally in order to keep him in employment as his contract was due to expire.

Over 2000 people from the village of Mogán were evacuated, as well as El Salobre. No human people died during the fire, but many houses were burned to the ground. Smoke was clearly visible from space.

Because Palmitos Park was severely affected by the fire, it was closed for a whole year. The park opened for the public again August 4, 2008. It has a new section with information about the forest fire.
