= Aqualand =

Business of waterparks

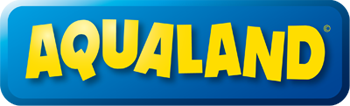
- Industry: Water Park operator
- Founded: 1983
- Headquarters: Spain
- Number of locations: 15
- Area served: Europe
- Products: Water parks
- Parent: Aspro Ocio S.A.
- Website: Official website

Aqualand is a chain of water-amusement parks operated by Spanish tourism group Aspro Ocio S.A. It is the largest such group operating in Europe.

Overall there are five Aqualands in Spain and one in Portugal, eight in France and one in the Netherlands. Aspro Ocio also owns a number of other differently branded properties including Las Águilas Jungle Park on Tenerife.

== Locations ==
=== Spain ===
==== Aqualand Costa Adeje ====
The park at Costa Adeje features 16 attractions, including 11 water slides, a water playground, a splash pad, a kids pool, a children's area, and a wave pool.

==== Aqualand Bahía de Cadiz ====
The park features 11 attractions, including 8 water slides, a family area, a water playground, and a wave pool.

==== Aqualand el Arenal ====
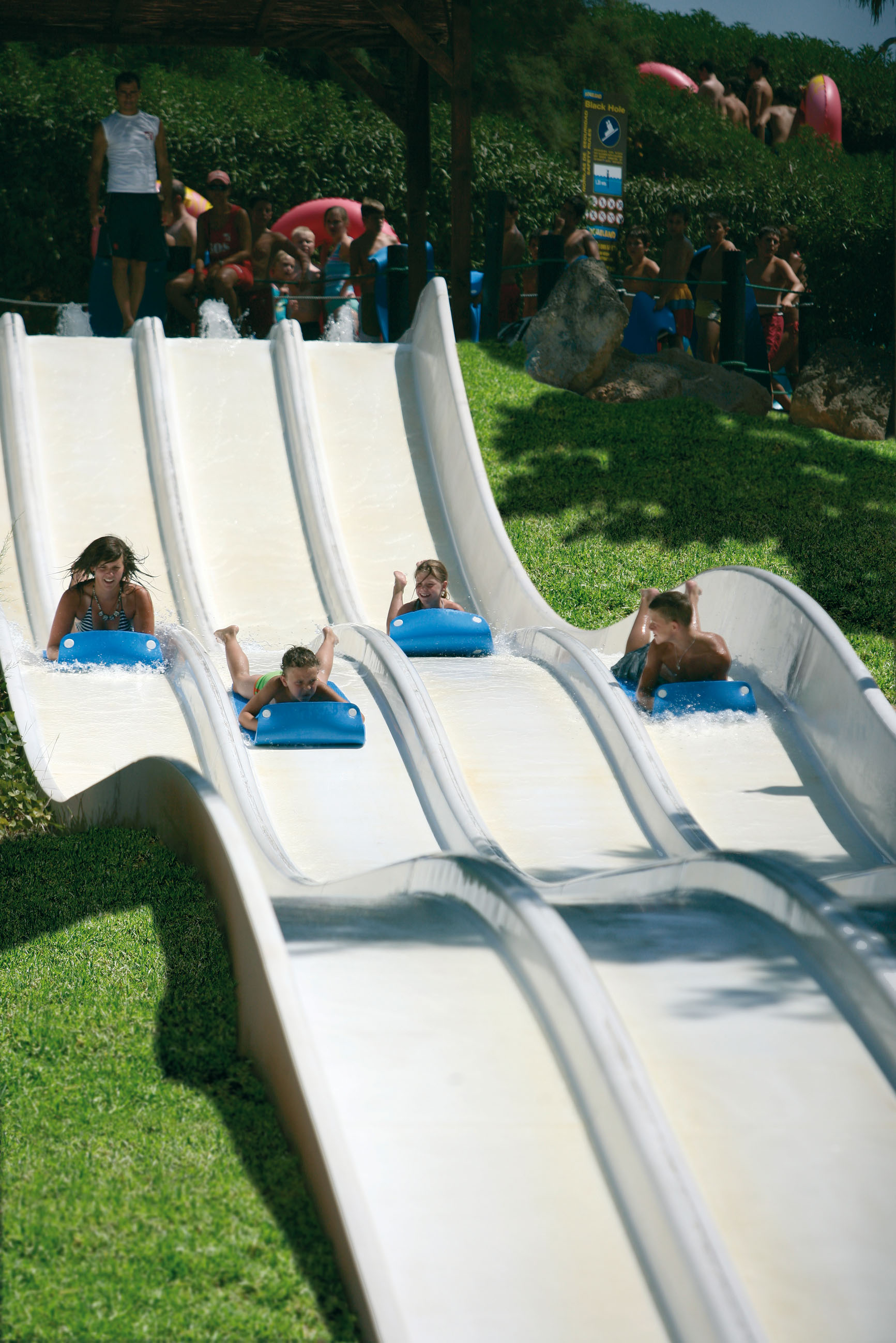
Water slide, Aqualand El Arenal

The park at El Arenal/s'Arenal features 20 attractions, including 12 water slides, 4 children's areas, a lazy river, and a wave pool.

==== Aqualand Torremolinos ====
The park at Torremolinos features 17 attractions, including 12 water slides, 2 children's area, a wave pool, a splash pad, and a jacuzzi,

==== Aqualand Maspalomas ====
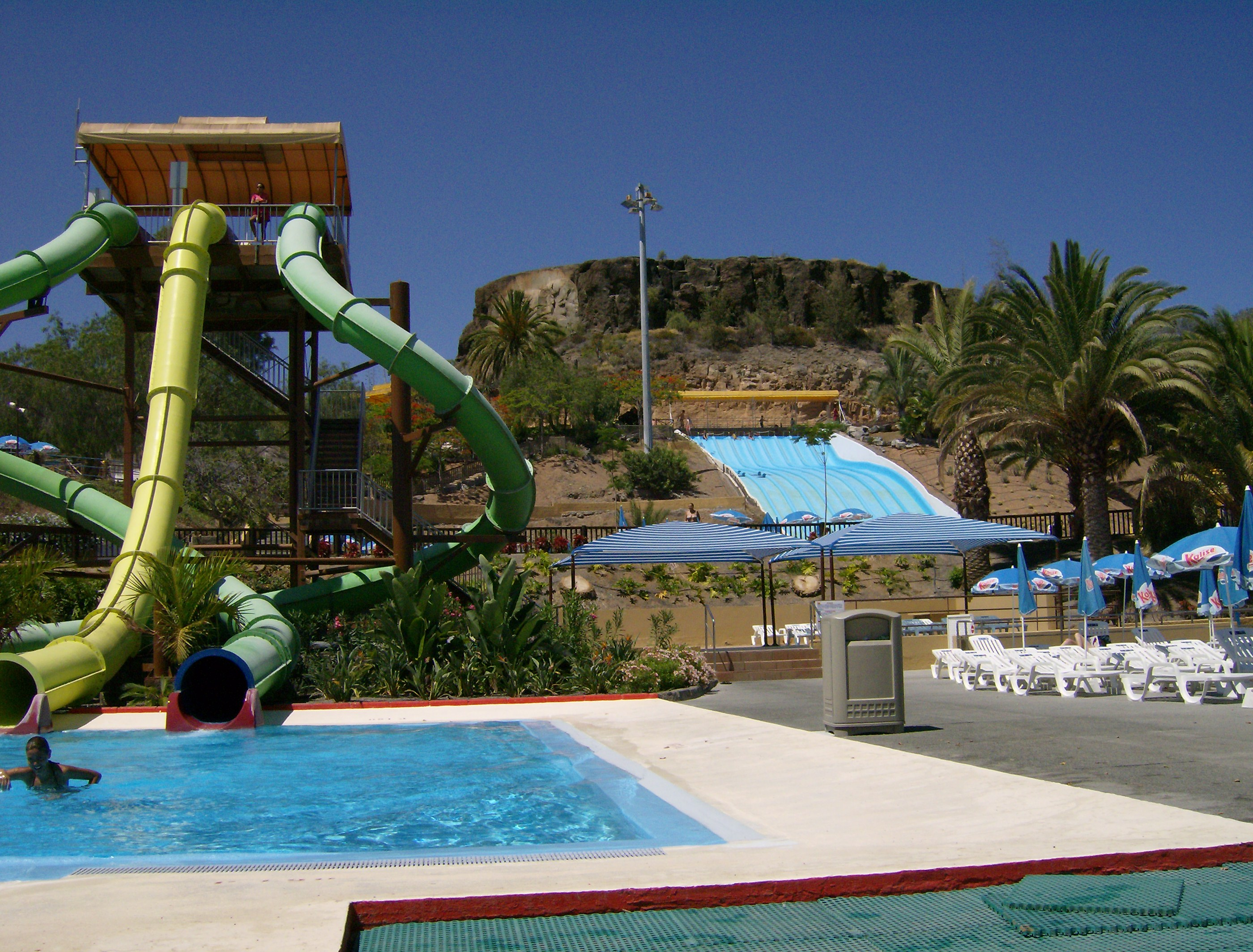
Water slide, Aqualand Maspalomas (Gran Canaria)

The park at Maspalomas features 18 attractions, including 15 water slides, 3 children's areas, a wave pool, a lazy river, and a bubble pool.

=== Portugal ===
==== Aqualand Algarve ====
The park features 12 attractions, including 8 water slides, a children's area, wave pool, semi-olympic swimming pool, and lazy river.

=== France ===
==== Aqualand Agen ====
The park at Agen includes 16 attractions, including 12 water slides, 2 children's areas, a lazy river, and a wave pool.

==== Aqualand Bassin D'Arcachon ====
The park features 13 attractions, including 8 water slides, a children's area, a river rapids, a lazy river, a bubble pool, and a wave pool.

==== Aqualand Saint Cyprien ====
The park features 15 attractions, including 10 water slides, 2 children's areas, a bubble pool, a lazy river, and a wave pool.

==== Aqualand Cap d'Agde ====
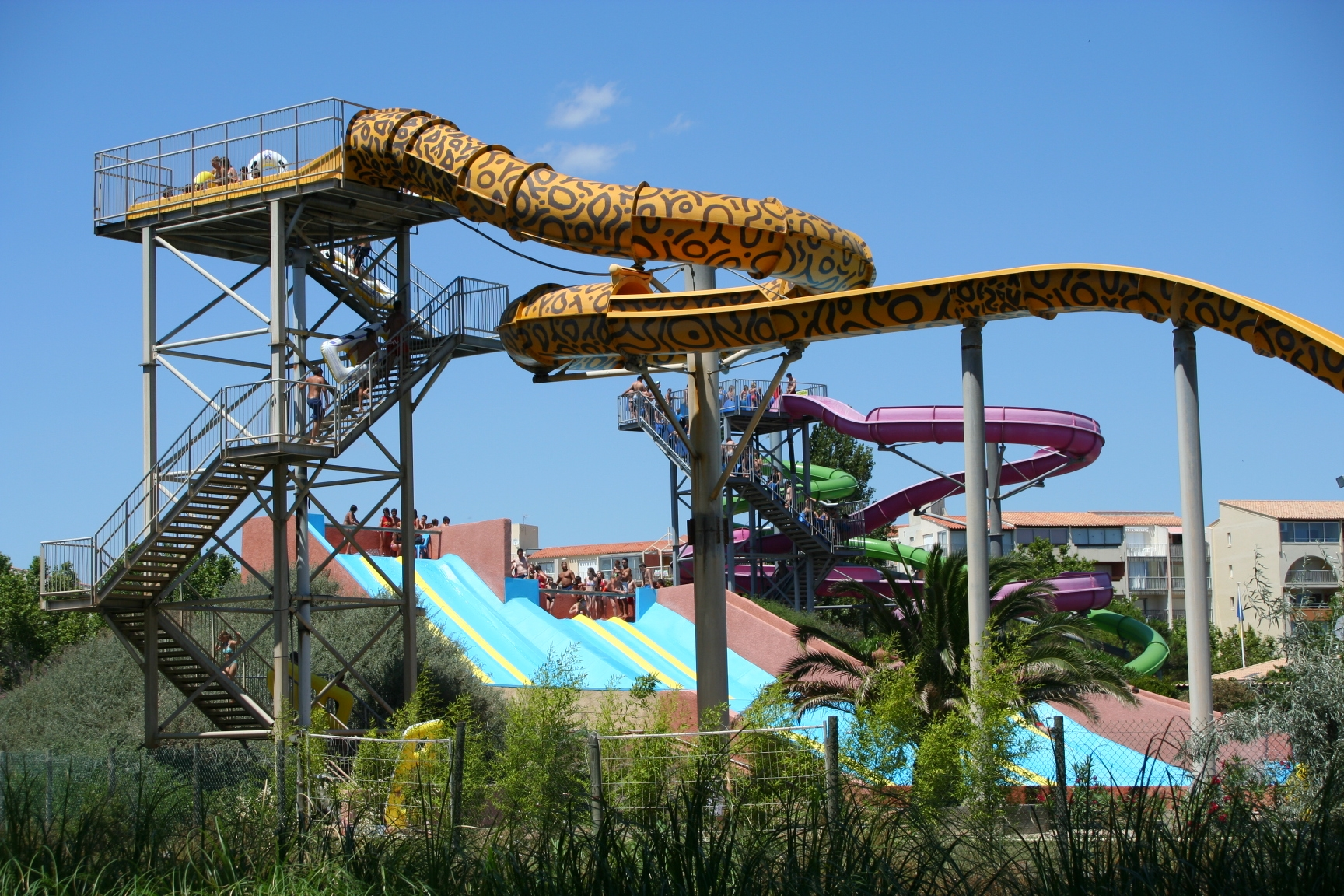
Aqualand Cap d'Agde water slide

The park at Cap d'Agde features 14 attractions, including 9 water slides, a children's area, a river rapids, a lazy river, a bubble pool, and a wave pool.

==== Aqualand Saint-Cyr-sur-Mer ====
The park at Saint-Cyr-sur-Mer features 13 attractions, including 9 water slides, a children's area, a lazy river, a bubble pool, and a wave pool.

==== Aqualand Frèjus ====
The park at Frèjus features 19 attractions, including 15 water slides, 2 children's areas, and a wave pool.

==== Aqualand Sainte Maxime ====
The park at Sainte-Maxime features 9 attractions, including 6 water slides, a children's area, a bubble pool, and a wave pool.

==== Aqualand Port Leucate ====
The park at Leucate features 7 attractions, including 4 water slides, a lazy river, a children's area, and a pool.
