= Shark tunnel =

Underwater viewing tunnel in large aquariums

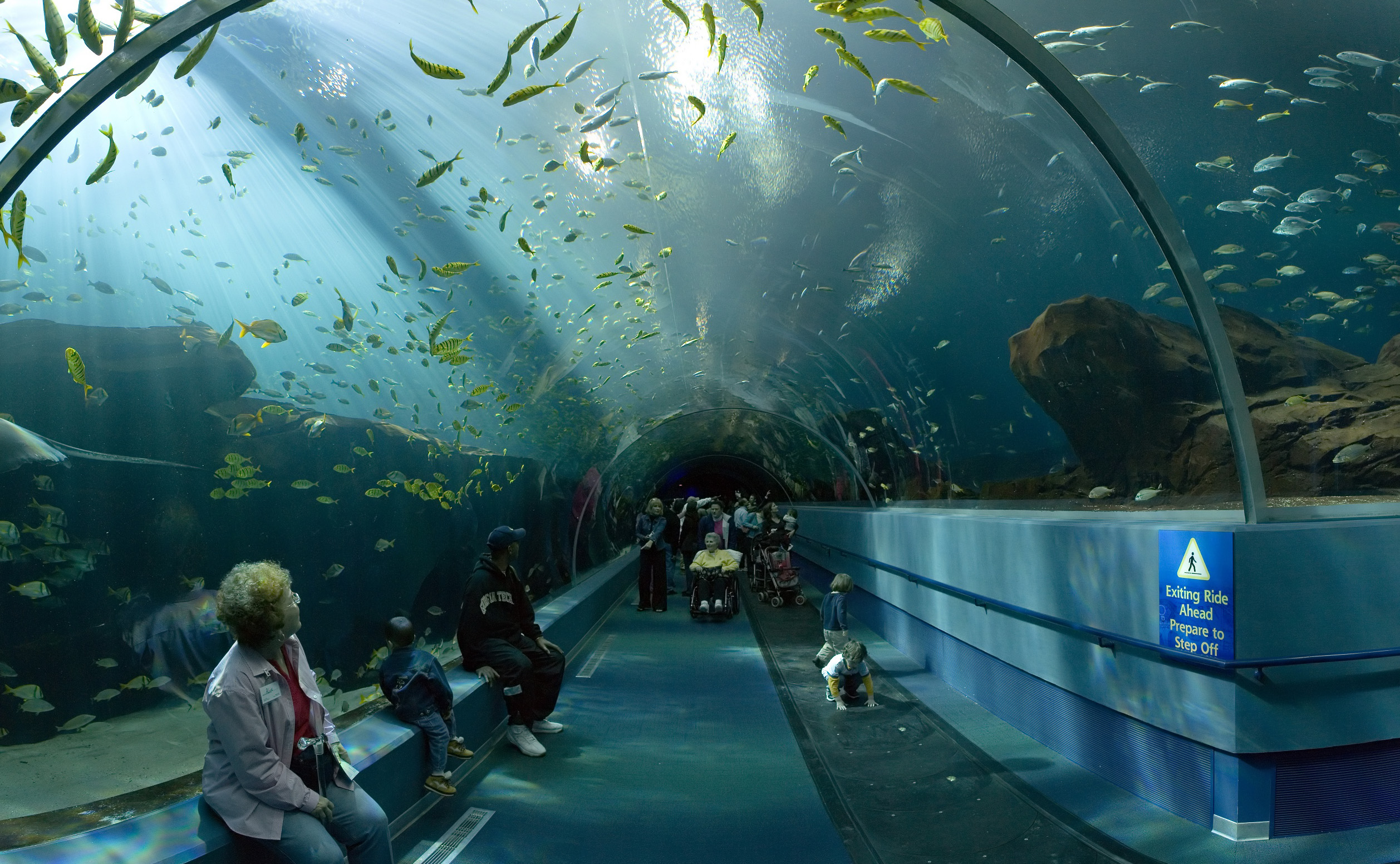
Shark Tunnel at the Georgia Aquarium

A shark tunnel (or aquarium tunnel, acrylic tunnel and exhibit tunnel) is an underwater tunnel that passes through an aquarium, typically with sharks and related aquatic life. They are usually made of thick acrylic glass. The first aquarium tunnel in the world was installed in 1985 at Kelly Tarlton's Underwater World in Auckland, New Zealand.

Most aquarium tunnels are cylindrical in shape, though tunnels can be made elliptical (to make them wider and still keep the top of the tunnel closer to the visitors), or even square.

== List of aquariums with shark tunnels ==
This list is sorted alphabetically by aquarium name.

Aquarium name	Location	Length of tunnel	Depth of tunnel floor in aquarium	Tank size
Acuario Nautilus	Lima, Peru	49 ft (15 m)	9.8 ft (3 m)	400,000 US gal (1,500,500 L)
Adventure Aquarium	Camden, New Jersey, United States	40 ft (12 m)	9 ft (2.7 m)	550,000 US gal (2,100,000 L)
Antalya Aquarium	Antalya, Turkey	430 ft (131 m)	11 ft (3.7 m)	1,300,000 US gal (5,000,000 L)
Aquaria KLCC	Kuala Lumpur, Malaysia	300 ft (90 m)	?	?
Aquarium Barcelona	Barcelona, Spain	260 ft (80 m)	16 ft (5 m)	980,000 US gal (3,700,000 L)
Aquarium of the Bay	San Francisco, California, United States	300 ft (91 m)	?	700,000 US gal (2,600,000 L)
Aquarium of Western Australia	Perth, Western Australia, Australia	322 ft (98 m)	?	790,000 US gal (3,000,000 L)
Audubon Aquarium of the Americas	New Orleans, Louisiana, United States	30 ft (9.1 m)	?	?
California Academy of Sciences (rainforest exhibit)	San Francisco, California, United States	25 ft (7.6 m)	?	100,000 US gal (380,000 L)
Cebu Ocean Park	Cebu City, Philippines	?	?	?
Dallas World Aquarium	Dallas, Texas, United States	?	?	?
Deep Sea World	North Queensferry, Fife, Scotland	367 ft (112 m)	9.8 ft (3 m)	1,000,000 imp gal (4,500,000 L; 1,200,000 US gal)
Oceanium at Diergaarde Blijdorp	Rotterdam, the Netherlands	?	?	?
Downtown Aquarium, Denver	Denver, Colorado, United States	?	?	?
Downtown Aquarium, Houston	Houston, Texas, United States	?	?	?
Dubai Mall Aquarium - Underwater Zoo	Dubai, United Arab Emirates	167 ft (51 m)	?	2,600,000 US gal (10,000,000 L)
Funtastic Aquariums Anzali	Anzali, Iran	111 ft (34 m)	14 ft (4.5 m)	370,000 US gal (1,400,000 L)
Funtastic Aquariums Izmir	İzmir, Turkey	39 ft (12 m)	11 ft (3.5 m)	400,000 US gal (1,500,000 L)
Georgia Aquarium	Atlanta, Georgia, United States	100 ft (30 m)	20–30 ft (6.1–9.1 m)	6,300,000 US gal (24,000,000 L)
Greater Cleveland Aquarium	Cleveland, Ohio, United States	175 ft (53 m)	9 ft (2.7 m)	230,000 US gal (870,000 L)
Henry Doorly Zoo	Omaha, Nebraska, United States	70 ft (21 m)	17 ft (5.2 m)	900,000 US gal (3,400,000 L)
Kelly Tarlton's Sea Life Aquarium	Auckland, New Zealand	72 ft (22 m)	8 ft (2.4 m)	400,000 US gal (1,500,000 L)
Manila Ocean Park	Manila, Philippines	?	?	?
Maui Ocean Center	Maalaea, Hawaii, United States	54 ft (16 m)	?	750,000 US gal (2,800,000 L)
National Aquarium Denmark (Blue Planet)	Kastrup, Copenhagen, Denmark	52 ft (16 m)	?	1,100,000 US gal (4,000,000 L)
National Museum of Marine Biology and Aquarium	Checheng Township, Pingtung County, Taiwan	271 ft (82.5 m)	?	1,075,180 US gal (4,070,000 L)
Nausicaä Centre National de la Mer	Boulogne-sur-Mer, France	59 ft (18 m)	?	2,600,000 US gal (10,000,000 L)
Newport Aquarium	Newport, Kentucky, United States	85 ft (26 m)	13 ft (4.0 m) †	380,000 US gal (1,400,000 L)
Ocean Park Hong Kong	Hong Kong	?	?	?
Oklahoma Aquarium	Jenks, Oklahoma, United States	90 ft (27 m)	12–14 ft (3.7–4.3 m)	500,000 US gal (1,900,000 L)
Oregon Coast Aquarium	Newport, Oregon, United States	175 ft (53 m)	?	1,320,000 US gal (5,000,000 L)
Parc Aquarium du Québec	Quebec City, Quebec, Canada	?	?	92,000 US gal (350,000 L)
Polaria	Tromsø, Norway	?	?	?
Ripley's Aquarium of Canada	Toronto, Ontario, Canada	315 ft (96 m)		770,000 US gal (2,900,000 L)
Ripley's Aquarium of Myrtle Beach	Myrtle Beach, South Carolina, United States	330 ft (100 m)	?	750,000 US gal (2,800,000 L)
SeaWorld Orlando	Orlando, Florida, United States	60 ft (18 m)	?	?
Sea Life Bangkok Ocean World	Bangkok, Thailand	?	?	?
SEA LIFE Minnesota Aquarium	Minneapolis, Minnesota, United States	300 ft (91 m)	?	?
SeaWorld San Diego	San Diego, California, United States	57 ft (17 m)	?	280,000 US gal (1,100,000 L)
Shanghai Ocean Aquarium	Shanghai, China	390 ft (120 m)	?	580,000 US gal (2,200,000 L)
Shark Reef Aquarium	Las Vegas, Nevada, United States	?	?	?
Shedd Aquarium(upcoming)	Chicago, Illinois, United States	?	?	?
Sydney Aquarium	Sydney, Australia	?	?	530,000 US gal (2,000,000 L)
Taraporewala Aquarium	Mumbai, India	12 ft (3.7 m)	?	?
Turkuazoo	Istanbul, Turkey	262 ft (80 m)	?	?
The National Aquarium	Abu Dhabi, UAE	167 ft (51 m)	11 ft (3.5 m)	930,000 US gal (3,500,000 L)
Underwater World	Langkawi, Malaysia	49 ft (15 m)	?	130,000 US gal (500,000 L)
Underwater World	Mooloolaba, Queensland, Australia	?	?	?
Underwater World	Sentosa, Singapore	272 ft (83 m)	?	?
Vinpearl Underwater World	Nha Trang, Vietnam	?	?	?
Afrykarium at the Wrocław Zoo	Wrocław, Poland	59 ft (18 m)	?	?

† — Estimated based on top of tunnel being 4 ft (1.2 m) under the surface and 9 ft (2.7 m) to bottom of tunnel.

== See also ==
- Ithaa, an underwater restaurant in the Maldives.
- List of Aquaria
