= Harold Goodwin (professor) =

British responsible tourism academic

- Born: 23 June 1952 (age 74); Coventry, England
- Occupations: Educator, academic
- Known for: His work in Responsible Tourism
- Awards: Global Travel Hall of Fame sustainability award (2023)

Academic background
- Education: University of York; University of Manchester

Academic work
- Discipline: Tourism
- Sub-discipline: Responsible tourism
- Institutions: Durrell Institute of Conservation and Ecology, University of Kent Greenwich University, Leeds Metropolitan University, Manchester Metropolitan University
- Notable works: Taking Responsibility for Tourism: Responsible Tourism Management (2011); Responsible Tourism: Using Tourism for Sustainable Development (2016)
- Website: haroldgoodwin.info

Harold Goodwin (born 23 June 1952) is an English academic and campaigner in the field of Responsible Tourism. He was Professor of Responsible Tourism Management at Leeds Metropolitan University from 2006 to 2013 and is Professor Emeritus at Manchester Metropolitan University. In 2002 he co-chaired the Cape Town Conference on Responsible Tourism in Destinations and drafted the Cape Town Declaration, and he has chaired the panels of judges of the Responsible Tourism Awards since the awards were launched in 2004. He is the author of Taking Responsibility for Tourism (2011) and Responsible Tourism: Using Tourism for Sustainable Development (2016).

He founded the ICRT.global in 2024 a non-profit on a mission to share more knowledge and understanding of Responsible Tourism.

== Early life and education ==
Goodwin was born in Coventry. He took a degree in social sciences at the University of York in the early 1970s, followed by a doctorate in political science at the University of Manchester. Before moving into tourism research he worked in adult education, first for the Workers' Educational Association in Kent and then for the Inner London Education Authority in Camden.

== Career ==
Goodwin was research director of a three-year government-funded project on tourism, conservation and sustainable development, based at the Durrell Institute of Conservation and Ecology and at the School of Earth and Environmental Sciences of the University of Greenwich. The project produced comparative case studies of national parks in India, Indonesia and Zimbabwe, published as reports for the Department for International Development in 1997. In 1998 he published Sustainable Tourism and Poverty Elimination, A Discussion Paper for the Department for the Environment, Transport and the Regions and the Department for International Development. He was a founder member of the Pro-Poor Tourism Partnership with Caroline Ashley and Dilys Roe, with whom he co-wrote Pro-Poor Tourism Strategies: Making Tourism Work for the Poor (2001).

In 2001 he co-founded the travel company Responsible Travel with his former student Justin Francis. He later sold his shares in the company, saying that he wished to avoid a conflict of interest with his consultancy work for the British government.

In 2002 Goodwin co-chaired the Cape Town Conference on Responsible Tourism in Destinations, organised as a side event of the World Summit on Sustainable Development, and drafted the Cape Town Declaration on Responsible Tourism. In the same year he founded the International Centre for Responsible Tourism (ICRT) and the Responsible Tourism Partnership, of which he is managing director. He was lead author of the National Responsible Tourism Development Guidelines for South Africa, published by the country's Department of Environmental Affairs and Tourism in 2002.

Goodwin was Professor of Responsible Tourism Management at Leeds Metropolitan University from 2006 to 2013, where the ICRT taught postgraduate courses in responsible tourism. He then moved to Manchester Metropolitan University, from where he retired in 2016 and where he is Professor Emeritus and a senior fellow of the Institute of Place Management.

Goodwin has chaired the panels of judges of the World Responsible Tourism Awards since the awards were launched in 2004. The programme, later renamed the Global Responsible Tourism Awards, marked its twentieth anniversary in 2024. He has served as WTM's Responsible Tourism Adviser and advises WTM Africa on its responsible tourism programme.

Goodwin has advised businesses, communities and destination governments on Responsible Tourism. In 2008 the Kerala Department of Tourism invited him to take the 2nd International Conference on Responsible Tourism in Destinations to Kerala. The Kerala Declaration laid the basis for Kerala’s adoption of Responsible Tourism across the state. In 2023, The Hindu reported his assessment of the state's progress as a responsible tourism destination. Kerala's tourism department has described him as "the father of Responsible Tourism".

In 2022 Goodwin wrote the Responsible Tourism Charter, launched and signed on Magna Carta Island. He is the founder of ICRT.global, a non-profit umbrella body for the international centres for responsible tourism around the world, and writes a regular column for the travel news site Travel Tomorrow.

== Books ==
His book, Taking Responsibility for Tourism was published by Goodfellow in 2011. Geoffrey Wall described the book as "a call to action" in the tradition of Jost Krippendorf. Wall summarised its argument: the "triple bottom line" approach to sustainable tourism had failed to deliver the improvements expected of it, and change should instead come from responsibility taken up by all of tourism's stakeholders, with responsible tourism treated as a movement rather than given a fixed definition. The book was also positively received in reviews in the Journal of Sustainable Tourism and Tourism Geographies.

A second edition of his Responsible Tourism: Using Tourism for Sustainable Development was published by Goodfellow in 2016 and reviewed in Tourism Management and Tourism Geographies. A chapter-length interview with Goodwin appears in Florian Kaefer's Sustainability Leadership in Tourism (Springer, 2022).

== Selected publications ==
- Goodwin, Harold (1996). "In Pursuit of Ecotourism". Biodiversity and Conservation. 5 (3): 277–291.
- Ashley, Caroline; Roe, Dilys; Goodwin, Harold (2001). Pro-Poor Tourism Strategies: Making Tourism Work for the Poor. London: Overseas Development Institute.
- Goodwin, Harold (2011). Taking Responsibility for Tourism. Oxford: Goodfellow Publishers. ISBN 978-1-906884-39-0.
- Goodwin, Harold (2016). Responsible Tourism: Using Tourism for Sustainable Development (2nd ed.). Oxford: Goodfellow Publishers. ISBN 978-1-910158-85-2.

== Awards and honours ==
- 2023: sustainability award for individual contribution, Global Travel Hall of Fame, whose Academy recognised him as founder of the responsible tourism movement.
- Community Award of the Kent Association of Local Councils, for voluntary service in Faversham.

== Personal life ==
Goodwin has lived in Faversham, Kent, since 1977. He was a trustee of the Faversham Society from 2014 and chaired the society from 2016 to 2024. He chairs the Faversham Community Land Trust and the Friends of St Mary of Charity, and is a founder director of the Faversham Food Festival which ran 2014-2020.
