= Taking Responsibility for Tourism: Responsible Tourism Management =

2011 book by Harold Goodwin

- Cover of the second edition (2016)
- Author: Harold Goodwin
- Language: English
- Subject: Responsible tourism, ecotourism
- Publisher: Goodfellow Publishers
- Publication date: 2011
- Publication place: United Kingdom
- Media type: Print and digital
- Pages: 256
- ISBN: 978-1-906884-39-0 (1st edition)
- 2nd edition published 2016 as Responsible Tourism: Using Tourism for Sustainable Development, ISBN 978-1-910158-85-2

Taking Responsibility for Tourism: Responsible Tourism Management is a 2011 book by the British academic and campaigner Harold Goodwin, published by Goodfellow Publishers of Oxford. Goodwin wrote it while he was Professor of Responsible Tourism Management at Leeds Metropolitan University. The author combines a history of the responsible tourism movement, which he dates to the work of Jost Krippendorf (1939–2003) and helped to codify by drafting both the 2002 Cape Town Declaration and the 2008 Kerala Declaration, with an argument that tourism can only be made sustainable if tourists, businesses and governments take responsibility for it.

A revised second edition appeared from the same publisher in 2016 under a new title, Responsible Tourism: Using Tourism for Sustainable Development. Goodwin added material on resilience, voluntourism, child protection, disintermediation in the travel trade, tourism and the UN Sustainable Development Goals, slum tourism, shared value and animal welfare.

== Background ==
Goodwin reused the book's title for his inaugural professorial lecture at Manchester Metropolitan University on 3 April 2014, given as the opening address of the 8th International Conference on Responsible Tourism in Destinations. In the lecture Goodwin recounted how he had arrived at the book's ideas. He came to the subject through the ecotourism debates of the 1980s, about which he "was always very skeptical". A research grant announced by the overseas development minister Baroness Chalker took him to the Durrell Institute of Conservation and Ecology at the University of Kent, where, he said, the research confirmed his doubts: successful ecotourism projects existed, but across a whole national park system the claimed benefits were almost impossible to find.

In the mid-1990s, when Voluntary Service Overseas asked him to help with a campaign for ethical tourism. The campaign led to research for the Association of Independent Tour Operators, whose members agreed to publish a statement acknowledging that tour operators could do both good and harm and that "all too often in the past the harm has outweighed the good". Goodwin said he had not believed they would publish that sentence.

Goodwin also told the audience that when he wrote the Cape Town Declaration in 2002 he had not yet read Krippendorf, to whose memory the book is dedicated. He showed the original slide used at Cape Town, which linked the UNWTO Global Code of Ethics, triple bottom line sustainability and the taking of responsibility. World Travel Market, he added, had chosen the Cape Town Declaration's definition of responsible tourism before he became its responsible tourism advisor: "it was not my influence that caused them to do that".

== Summary ==
The book makes the case for what Goodwin calls Responsible Tourism, a term he capitalises because he means a movement, not a niche product. He introduces the book as "the story of a journey, my journey": Goodwin has been a tourist, a tour leader, an academic and a campaigner, and his starting point is that tourism is neither good nor bad in itself. It is a human activity, shaped by the daily choices of businesses, governments and tourists; "tourism is what we make of it". The book is dedicated to the Swiss tourism scholar Jost Krippendorf, whose 1987 call for "rebellious tourists and rebellious locals" Goodwin treats as the movement's founding statement. Goodwin argues that the sustainable development agenda of the Brundtland Report and the 1992 Rio Earth Summit has been widely endorsed and rarely acted on. Sustainability, in his account, is an outcome; responsibility is the process that might produce it. Three aspects of responsibility matter for tourism: accountability, the capability or capacity to act, and the willingness to respond.

There are eight chapters in the book, divided into two parts. The first asks why responsibility is needed. Goodwin sees tourism as a repeated tragedy of the commons: hoteliers overbuild in Greece and around Machu Picchu, businesses freeload on public space, greenhouse gas emissions go unpriced. He follows the idea of responsible tourism from Krippendorf to the Cape Town Declaration of 2002, which he wrote and which commits the movement to "create better places for people to live in and for people to visit", and he replies to academic critics of the movement, Brian Wheeller and Jim Butcher among them. Goodwin describes how Responsible Tourism took hold in the British outbound market, where the VSO WorldWise and Tearfund campaigns of the late 1990s preceded its adoption by trade associations and major operators. He dedicates a chapter to lay out the business case, which he locates in consumer trust, repeat bookings, cost savings and risk management. There is another chapter on destinations contrasts national approaches in Thailand, England and South Africa, the first country to adopt Responsible Tourism as national policy, with local governance in Whistler, Kangaroo Island, the New Forest and Cape Town.

The second part works through social, economic and environmental responsibility in practice, the "triple bottom line". The cases come from Goodwin's consultancy and campaigning work: bullfighting in Catalonia, rodeo protests at the Calgary Stampede, hedonistic resort tourism in Faliraki and Kavos, hotel oversupply in Ireland and northern Peru, all-inclusives in the Gambia and Jamaica, and water scarcity in Mallorca and Mumbai. Goodwin's habit is to judge tourism by its measured results rather than by its labels. On that test, he argues, ecotourism, community-based tourism, sustainability certification and carbon offsetting have mostly not delivered what they promise, and well-managed mass tourism may do more for local communities than any of them. Goodwin uses the final part of the book to make a statement of principles and an agenda for the decade ahead, he writes: "Responsible Tourism is about identifying the issues which matter and addressing them ... Those who have an opportunity to make tourism better have a responsibility to respond, to do what they can and to encourage others."

== Second edition ==
Goodwin reworked the book for the second edition, which Goodfellow published in 2016 as Responsible Tourism: Using Tourism for Sustainable Development. Seven chapters replace the first edition's eight. The chapters on the British marketplace and the business case became one, and Goodwin cut the history of the UK campaigns from the book, issuing it as a free paper, The Emergence of Responsible Tourism in the UK. In the preface, signed from Faversham and dated March 2011 and August 2016, Goodwin names the issues that had emerged since the first edition: child protection, volunteering abroad, the UN Sustainable Development Goals, shared value, slum tourism, animal welfare and the consequences of disintermediation. A new section on sustainability and resilience joins the chapter on destinations.

The new material holds to the first edition's test of judging tourism by its measured results. Goodwin believes that volunteering in orphanages has created a trade in children, citing reports that 72 per cent of the children in Cambodian orphanages were not orphans, and calls on the industry to stop organising orphanage visits. He describes gap-year volunteers who displaced paid labourers, the petition that led Thomas Cook to stop selling elephant rides, the fall in SeaWorld's attendance after the documentary Blackfish, and the growth of unregistered Airbnb lettings that brought protests in Barcelona and a ban in Berlin. Three of the Sustainable Development Goals, adopted in 2015, set targets for tourism. Goodwin calls the goals ambitious and worthy but considered the targets too vague to tell whether they have been met.

== Reviews ==
In Tourism Geographies, Holly Donohoe remarked on Goodwin's "infallible optimism" and thought that the book "may well prove to be a defining text for responsible tourism into the 21st century". The principal contribution of the opening chapter, she suggested, might be its separation of responsibility, a process, from sustainability, an outcome. The two were chronically confused in professional and academic forums. Greg Willson, in the Journal of Ecotourism, compared the style to "a sweeping travelogue", nothing like the sanitised prose usual in the field, and wanted the book considered as mandatory reading, "an essential volume in libraries and bookcases throughout the world". He called the depth of the case studies outstanding and pointed teachers to the passages on bullfighting in Catalonia, a rodeo in Vancouver and protests on Easter Island. Truong Van Dao in the Journal of Sustainable Tourism found it "both rigorous and practical", for practitioners as much as for students and researchers, and Veena Tewari in Anatolia enjoyed a flow "not that of a structured textbook but a knowledge-gathering fun-to-read book, which grabs the interest of the reader".

Geoffrey Wall, in his review in the International Journal of Contemporary Hospitality Management, reported that Goodwin "pulls no punches" and counted the hackles raised among devotees of ecotourism, community-based tourism, carbon offsets, certification and pro-poor tourism as one of the book's great strengths. Donohoe read the same attacks as an answer to Brian Wheeller's old objection that responsible tourism had never faced up to the volume of global travel. Truong dwelt on the unsentimental treatment of community-based and pro-poor tourism: good and necessary ideas, in Goodwin's judgment, with little evidence that they worked. Deepak Chhabra quoted with approval the observation that certificates "carry no story, and have relatively little or no marketing or PR value."

Chhabra also lodged the sharpest criticism: the book was thin on theory. "A compelling overarching theoretical basis for its suggested agenda is remiss", she wrote, and several chapters made too little use of the research on authenticity, stakeholder collaboration and resident attitudes. She recommended it anyway, as "an expression of practitioner expertise" and "a distinguished hands-on text" for supplemental course reading. Wall had his own quibbles: occasional overstatement, an awkward apparatus of footnotes and chapter-end references, short shrift for North America, not much on government, and a worry that action might outrun understanding. None of it changed his conclusion. Goodwin had dealt with difficult ideas "in a simple, but not simplistic way", and "Krippendorf would have been proud!"
