= Justin Francis =

Justin Francis may refer to:

- Justin Francis (director)
- Justin Francis (entrepreneur)
- Justin Francis (American football)
