= The Man in Seat Sixty-One =

British travel website

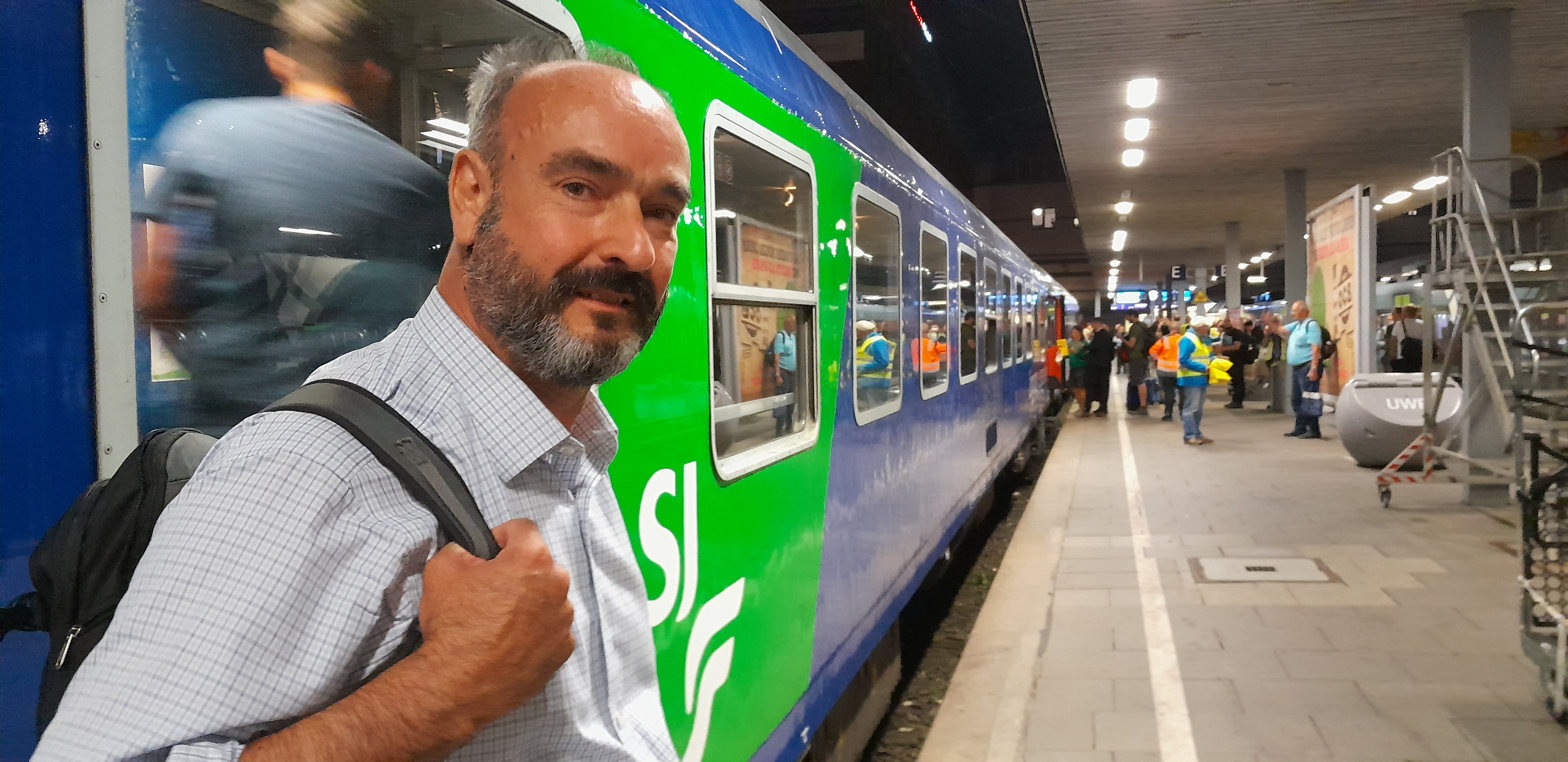
- Mark Smith in 2022
- Website type: Personal business
- Available in: English
- Owner: Mark Smith
- Creator: Mark Smith
- Website: www.seat61.com
- Commercial: Partial
- Registration: Not available
- Launched: 2001
- Current status: Active
- Content license: No warranty

The Man in Seat Sixty-One is a British travel website created, written and maintained by Mark Smith, a former rail industry worker. The website focuses almost exclusively on train-based travel, with occasional ferry recommendations.

The site has won several awards, including "Best Travel Website" in the Guardian & Observer Travel Awards in 2008. The Man in Seat Sixty-One provides information on the best routes, fares and times for journeys from the UK to most of Europe, and for rail travel within most countries in the rest of the world, including exhaustive coverage of the Indian Railways and Russian Railways.

== History ==
The site is a personal project run by Mark Smith, formerly a manager in the rail industry. The site is called Seat 61 after his preferred seat in First Class on the Eurostar. He began the site as a hobby in 2001, after frustration with the difficulty he perceived in finding how to book rail tickets within Europe. In September 2007 he gave up his job working for the Department for Transport to run the website full-time.

Smith subsequently wrote a book based on the site titled The Man in Seat 61: A Guide To Taking The Train Through Europe. Published by Bantam Press in 2008, the book mirrored the website in offering an "essential guide for anyone who wishes to travel to Europe and beyond by train". It sold over 10,000 copies and an updated second edition was published in 2010. This was followed by a second book in 2011, The Man in Seat 61: Worldwide, covering international train travel around Africa, Asia, the Americas and Australasia. Smith describes these books as "now long in the tooth" and directs travellers towards his website for up to date information.

In 2010, Guerrilla Films planned a TV series based on the website. A pilot episode featuring actor Kenneth Cranham was released covering the journey from London to St Petersburg by rail as far as Waterloo, Belgium.

In 2013, Smith launched an appeal for donations to UNICEF to support children in Syria in response to the Syrian civil war, encouraging anyone who his site has helped to express their gratitude via donations to the appeal. In October 2024 the appeal reached £50,000.

In 2023, Smith was interviewed in Ben Elton: The Great Railway Disaster, a Channel 4 Dispatches documentary about rail privatisation. In 2024 he featured in an episode of ITV's On Assignment filmed on the inaugural European Sleeper service between Brussels and Prague.

== Current ==
The site now receives more than one million visitors a month. Nearly all of the information compiled in the site is based on his own travels and experiences, and it includes in-depth guides on booking rail tickets within Europe, as well as information on booking rail travel to and within other areas of the world, including exhaustive coverage of the Indian Railways and Russian Railways.

The success of the site has led to Smith being interviewed for various travel media, including BBC Radio 4's Traveller's Tree, The Sunday Telegraph, The Sunday Times and The Guardian.

Smith opposes airline transport as part of travel, citing the increased environmental friendliness of train travel, as well as the ability to view scenery, such as the Austrian Alps, up close whilst travelling. He also prefers slow compartmentalised sleepers to high-speed trains but regularly travels in both ways, and believes they are the future of international travel. He has recommended travelling from London to Dublin by train and ferry (via Holyhead) instead of flying, and has promoted SailRail tickets as a more affordable way to travel between the two cities.

== Awards ==
- "Best Electronic Information Resource", Chartered Institute of Library and Information Professionals Knowledge & Information Management Awards 2021
- "Favourite Travel Website", Telegraph Travel Awards 2012
- "Best Low Carbon Transport & Technology Initiative", Responsible Travel Responsible Travel Awards 2010
- "Best Travel Website", Guardian & Observer Travel Awards 2008
- "14th Best Travel Website", The Independent's 50 Best Travel Websites
- "Best Travel Website", The Oldie Travel Awards 2008
- "Top Travel Website", Wanderlust Travel Awards 2007, 2008
- "Best Personal Contribution", Responsible Travel Responsible Tourism Awards 2006
