= Responsible Travel =

Activist travel company

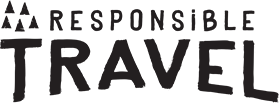
- Type: Online travel agency and publisher
- Industry: Tourism
- Founded: 2001 in Brighton, Sussex, England
- Headquarters: Brighton, England
- Key people: Justin Francis (British entrepreneur), Chair and Founder; Richard Skinner, Joint Managing Director; Tim Williamson, Joint Managing Director
- Products: Responsible holidays, travel guides and editorial
- Website: www.responsibletravel.com

Responsible Travel is a British travel agency and publisher. The company sells holidays it says are designed to maximise the benefit and minimise the harm involved in tourism.

Holidays are screened for their compliance with environmental, social and economic criteria with an emphasis on grassroot initiatives and local providers.

== History ==
Responsible Travel was founded in 2001 by Justin Francis and Harold Goodwin. Anita Roddick of The Body Shop was one of the first investors.

In 2004, Justin Francis founded The Responsible Tourism Awards, which were organised by Responsible Travel until 2016 and hosted by World Travel Market as part of World Responsible Tourism Day.

In 2004 the company launched a campaign ‘Had Enough’ urging three of the UK's largest travel companies – Thomas Cook, Thomson and MyTravel – to implement responsible tourism policies. A year later, all three had published their first Responsible Business policies.

In October 2009, Responsible Travel stopped offering carbon offsets (which it offered since 2002) claiming that people were using the offset as an excuse to pollute more.

In July 2013, Responsible Travel removed trips that involved volunteering at orphanages around the world for ethical reasons.

In 2014, the company removed elephant trekking and elephant performance trips from its collection.

In April 2014, the company launched a public petition to urge travel companies to stop selling tickets to establishments keeping cetaceans in captivity for public entertainment purposes.

In November 2016, Responsible Travel began funding day trips for children around the world to visit a local tourist attraction that they may never had had the privilege of visiting before.

In April 2017, Responsible Travel stopped promoting holidays that included a visit to a zoo, describing them as "relics of the past". The move was supported by The Born Free Foundation.

In July 2020, Responsible Travel made a commitment to contribute to a nature positive world by 2030.

In November 2021 at COP26 in Glasgow, Responsible Travel founder Justin Francis, Liv Garfield and DEFRA, with the support of Accenture, launched the 'Nature Handbook for Business' - a practical resource for working towards a nature positive world aimed at five industry sectors, including tourism.

In December 2024, Responsible Travel founder, Justin Francis, was awarded an OBE for services to nature and the environment.
