= Tony Wray =

British businessman (born 1961)

- Born: Antony Paul Wray; 2 November 1961 (age 64); Leicester
- Occupation: Businessman
- Years active: 1982–present
- Title: former Chief Executive of Severn Trent plc
- Term: 2007–2014
- Successor: Liv Garfield

Antony Paul Wray (born 2 November 1961) is a British businessman. He is the former Chief Executive of Severn Trent plc, a British water company.

== Early life ==
Wray grew up on a Leicester council estate.

He has a BSc degree.

== Career ==
Wray was the Chief Executive of Severn Trent from 2 October 2007 to 11 April 2014. He was succeeded by Liv Garfield.
