= Virtual zoo =

Animal exhibition via digital media

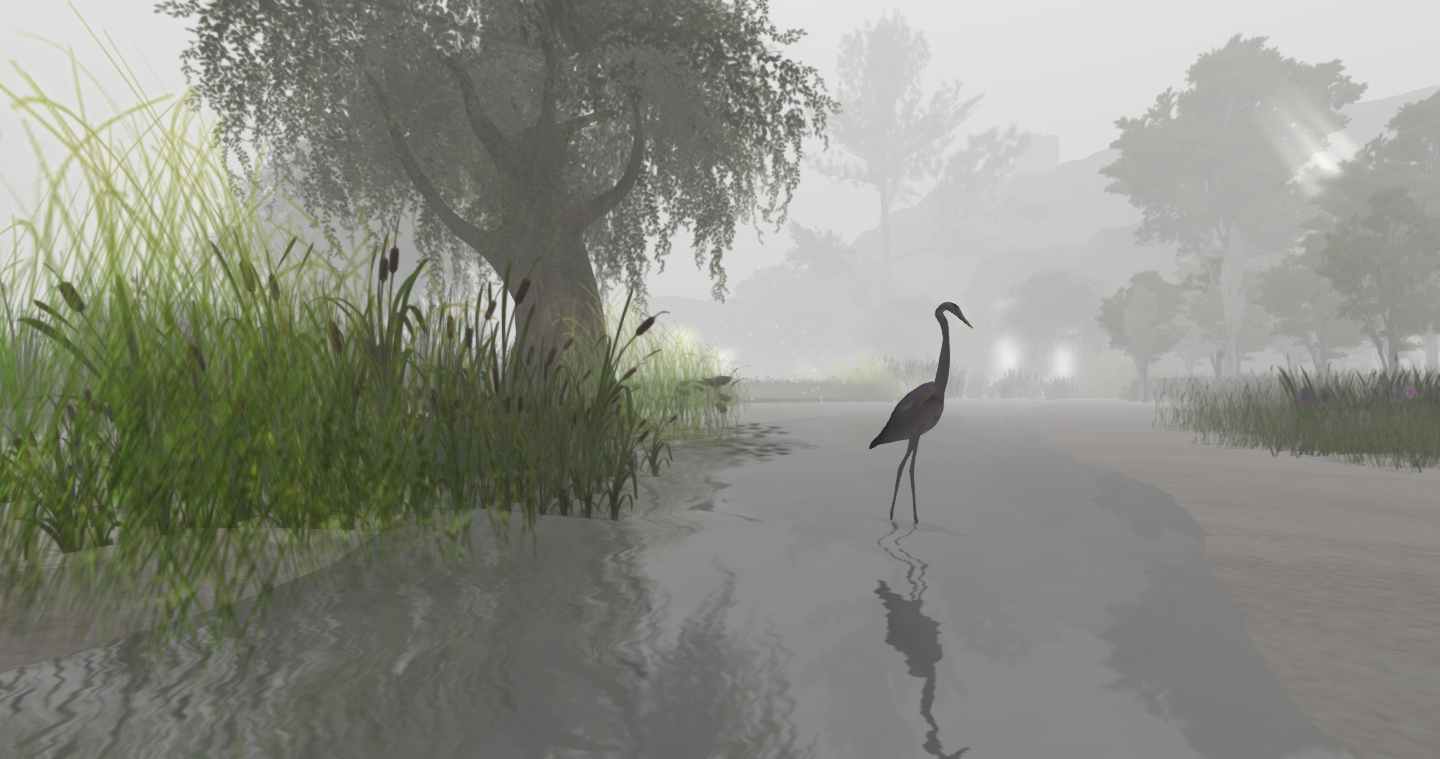
A great blue heron in the virtual environment of Second Life

A virtual zoo is an exploration of the zoo model of interacting with animals, but in a virtual environment such as a web page, a collection of videos, or virtual reality.

Many virtual zoos are websites that are created to simulate a visit to a zoo, and the visitors to these sites can view exhibits about animals and their habitats. Many zoos as well as schools have developed virtual zoos offering educational articles and media as exhibits.

== History ==
The first virtual zoo was created in 1994 by Ken Boschert, DVM. Boschert created his site as a way of informing people about animals and how to care for them. His site has been recognized by Education World and "Web 100".

In 2017, Hari Kunduru founded Zoptiks, a virtual zoo offering zoologist-backed information about animals and dinosaurs, and an augmented reality interface.

Streamed video clip from the panda enclosure at Moscow Zoo, December 2020

During the COVID-19 pandemic, families and children were unable to attend zoos due to nationwide lockdowns. Some groups such as Zoos Victoria offered a 24/7 livestream of animals including otters, lions and penguins.

== Purpose ==
The validity of virtual zoos has met with some resistance. However, many view virtual zoos as the way of the future for conservation. Zoos have faced ethical issues surrounding the capture and keeping of wild animals. Virtual zoos can provide information and experience without any disturbance to habits or ecosystems. According to Zoos Victoria, the stated purpose of a zoo is to be centers for wildlife experience, education, conservation and research. Virtual Zoos can contribute to these stated purposes, such as education and research, with little impact to animal life.
