= Justin Francis (entrepreneur) =

English social entrepreneur and environmentalist (born 1965)

Justin Francis OBE
- Born: 19 August 1965 (age 60); Wimbledon, London, England
- Occupations: Entrepreneur and environmentalist
- Known for: CEO and co-founder of Responsible Travel

Justin Francis OBE (born 19 August 1965) is an English social entrepreneur and environmentalist. He is the co-founder and Executive Chair of Responsible Travel, founded in 2001, an environmentally-conscious travel agency and online travel guide.

== Biography ==
Justin Francis OBE was born in 1965 in Wimbledon, London, and grew up in Bathford, Somerset. He studied geophysics at the University of Exeter after which he worked at advertising agency J. Walter Thompson for eight years. He joined The Body Shop as Social and Environmental Agenda Marketing Manager in 1997 and then went on to head up Worldwide Marketing Communications, working closely with Dame Anita Roddick.

== Responsible Travel ==
Inspired by a nine-month stint camping and travelling around Africa, Francis went back to university in 1999 to study for a Masters in Tourism, Conservation and Sustainable Development at The University of Greenwich. He set up Responsible Travel in April 2001 with the course professor, Dr. Harold Goodwin. Dame Anita Roddick was a seed investor offering funds as well as advice.

Roddick told Francis that a business should be “judged by how it treated the weak and the poor.” Francis aimed to take this mantra to tourism. and show that responsible tourism can be commercially successful. Francis says: “I don’t see myself as a traditional business person. I’m an activist using business as a tool to change the world.”

He overturned conventional thinking about travel businesses by creating a business model where travel companies and travellers could talk directly, and booking declarations were made as part of an honesty-based system.

Justin was one of the initial Trustees of British Charity The Travel Foundation. He sits on the Board of travel company, Basecamp Explorer Kenya.

In 2016 The Times named Francis as one of the world's 50 best ‘people to know in travel’.

== Activism ==
Francis’ mission is for a more 'caring' travel and tourism industry.

He has described the tourism industry as the “biggest freeloader in the business world” saying, in an interview with The Guardian, that “broadly speaking, tourism globally has been unmanaged and never been taken seriously by government. It’s fun, everybody’s happy, right? But really, tourism is one of the biggest and in some cases most aggressive industries on earth and it is taking governments a very long time to recognise that it needs managing.”

He has campaigned around the issue of overtourism – presenting a documentary on the issues, released in July 2018, the use of captive cetaceans in tourism, the ethics of voluntourism and many other issues associated with responsible tourism, including conservation, wildlife and human rights. He has been outspoken about the ineffective use of carbon offsetting schemes.

In 2004 he founded The Responsible Tourism Awards, which Responsible Travel ran until 2017.

In November 2016, kidney failure, and an inability to travel far as a result, gave Francis the inspiration to start the ‘Trip for a Trip’ scheme which would fund day trips for disadvantaged children around the world who lack the opportunity to travel. Justin returned to full health after a successful kidney transplant.

== UK Government role and work ==
In 2018 he joined the UK Government's Council for Sustainable Business (CSB), which advises The Department for Environment, Food and Rural Affairs on how businesses can help deliver the aims of the 25 Year Environment Plan. In 2021, in the run up to COP26 he led the CSB's work on nature and biodiversity.

In November 2021 at COP26 in Glasgow, Justin, Liv Garfield and DEFRA with support from Accenture launched the Nature Handbook for Business – a practical resource for working towards a nature positive world aimed at five industry sectors, including tourism. The advice is now available through the Business for Nature coalition.

Since January 2024, Justin has been Chair of Projects for Nature, a digital marketplace connecting nature projects in England with businesses willing to fund them. It was launched at COP28 in Dubai by The Secretary of State for the Environment, Food and Rural Affairs.

== Honours & awards ==
Francis was awarded an OBE in the King's New Year Honours List 2025 for services to Nature and to the Environment.
