= Journal of Sustainable Tourism =

- Discipline: Tourism
- Language: English
- Edited by: Xavier Font (Editor in chief)

Publication details
- History: 1993-present
- Publisher: Routledge
- Frequency: Monthly
- Impact factor: 9.470 (2021)

Standard abbreviations
- ISO 4: J. Sustain. Tour.

Indexing
- ISSN: 0966-9582
- OCLC no.: 795978020

Links
- Journal homepage; Online access; Online archive

The Journal of Sustainable Tourism is a monthly peer-reviewed academic journal, publishing theoretical, conceptual and empirical research about sustainable tourism. The research published in this journal targets advancing knowledge and critical understanding of the relationship between tourism and sustainable development.

== History ==
The journal was established in 1993 with Bill Bramwell and Bernard Lane as the founding editors, and is published by Routledge. The journal editorial board comprises 61 sustainable tourism scholars from research universities across the world led by an editors-in-chief, Xavier Font (University of Surrey, UK), and four Associate Editors, Alexandra Coghlan (Griffith University, Australia), ShiNa Li (Sun Yat-sen University, China), Kyle Woosnam (University of Georgia, USA), and Jialin (Snow) Wu (University of Huddersfield, UK)

== Academic Rankings ==
According to the Journal Citation Reports, the journal has a 2020 impact factor of 7.968, ranking it top 10 out of 50 journals in the category "Hospitality, Leisure, Sport & Tourism". In 2018, SJR ranks this journal 8th in the list of 50 "Tourism, Leisure & Hospitality Management" journals with a SJR index of 1.687 and Australian Business Deans Council grants it an "A+" ranking in the tourism field (1506).
