= Liv Garfield =

British businesswoman (born 1975)

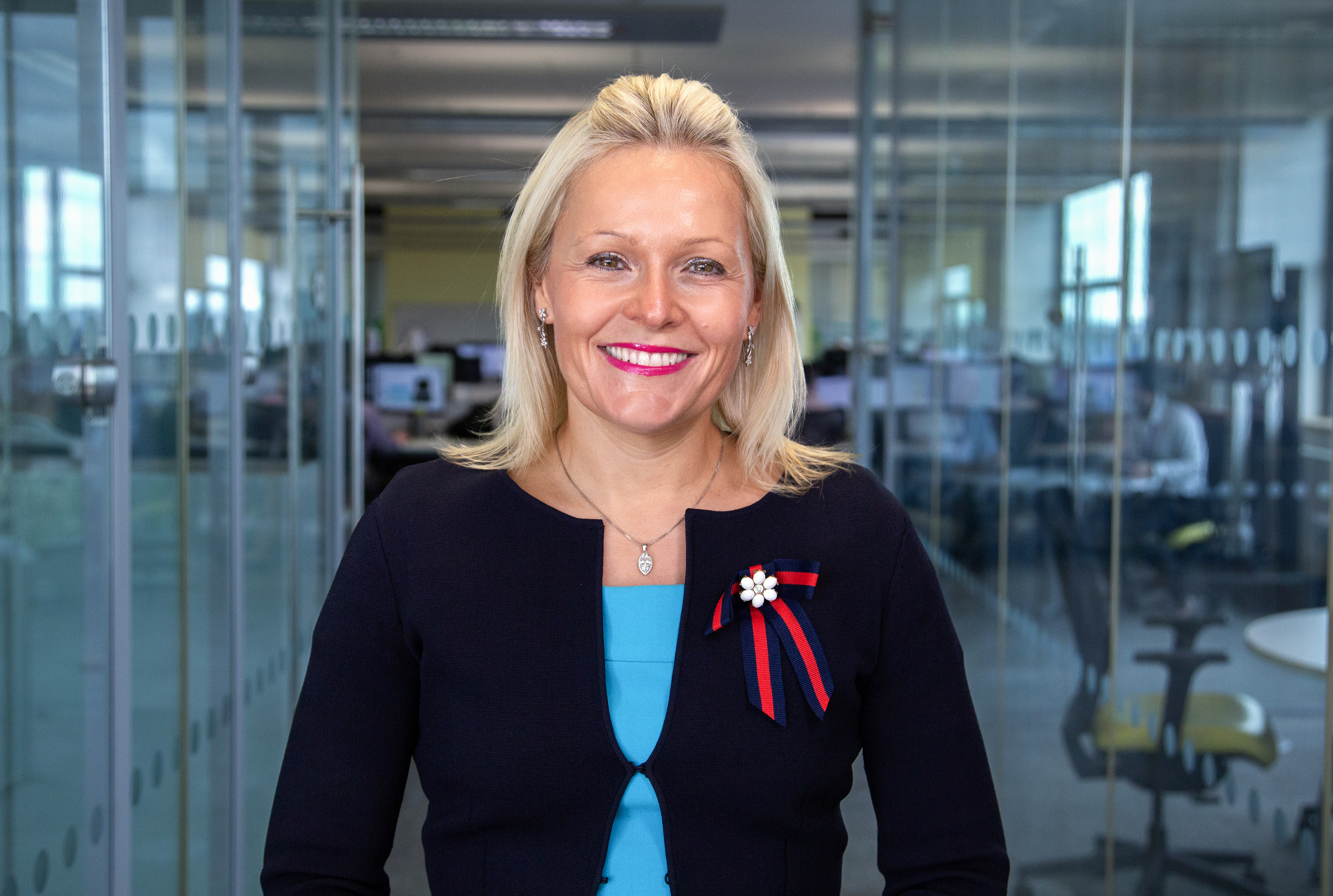
- Born: Olivia Ruth Burgess; September 10, 1975 (age 50)
- Education: Bootham School, York; New Hall, Cambridge
- Occupation: Chief executive
- Title: Chief Executive of Severn Trent plc
- Term: April 2014-December 2025
- Predecessor: Tony Wray
- Children: Two sons

Olivia Ruth Garfield CBE (born 10 September 1975) is a British businesswoman. She was chief executive of Severn Trent from April 2014 to December 2025. She was chief executive of Openreach, part of BT Group, from 2011 to 2014.

== Early life ==
Olivia was raised in Harrogate. Her parents were originally from Liverpool, run a project management and engineering business in Harrogate. She was educated at Birklands Belmont School (now Belmont Grosvenor) in Birstwith near Harrogate, followed by the co-educational Bootham School, an independent school in York.

== Career ==
After graduating, she spent a year working at the British Consulate in Brussels. She then worked at Accenture as a consultant in their communications and high-tech market division for six years.

=== BT ===
In January 2003, she joined BT as general manager. She later became BT's director of strategy and regulatory affairs. On 1 April 2011 she was made chief executive of their Openreach division; Openreach had been formed in 2006. In that position, she oversaw a £2.5 billion rollout of fibre broadband (BT Infinity service). In March 2017, BT received the biggest Ofcom fine ever of £42 million due to inappropriate use of the Deemed Consent to delay Ethernet provision to other providers, which started and continued in January 2013 through to December 2014 while she was CEO. In 2013, Garfield was identified by Fortune Magazine as one of the world's fastest-rising corporate stars. In 2014, Fortune called her the 14th Most Powerful Woman in Europe, Middle East, and Africa.

=== Severn Trent ===
In April 2014, Garfield became the chief executive of Severn Trent. In July 2015 she oversaw the takeover of Severn Trent Water Purification, a subsidiary of Severn Trent Plc, by Italian company DeNora.

May 2018, Garfield's role at Severn Trent made her the youngest female CEO of a FTSE 100 company.

She was appointed Commander of the Order of the British Empire (CBE) in the 2020 Birthday Honours for services to the water industry, while at the same time the aggregate annual spill durations to rivers and streams from Severn Trent's sewer overflows totalled 64 years.

In 2021, the parliamentary Environmental Audit Committee described some of the evidence Garfield gave before the committee as "disingenuous".

In May 2024, it was announced Garfield received pay of £3.2 million in 2023-24, including a £584,000 bonus.

In Garfield’s 12 years the company’s market cap grew, taking Severn Trent from the lower edges of the FTSE 100 to be in the FTSE 50. The company consistently outperformed peers and earned recognition as the top operational performer for 11 of 12 years and the leading environmental performer for six consecutive year.

Under Garfield’s leadership the company also doubled the size of its workforce and implemented social mobility strategies to support marginalised groups across the Midlands, including care leavers, ex-offenders and young people looking for opportunities.

Garfield left Severn Trent in December 2025.

=== Other ===
She was a non-executive director at Tesco February 2023 and February 2015.

In May 2018, Garfield was announced as the 2018 winner of the Veuve Cliquot Business Woman Award.

In December 2022 Garfield joined as a director at Brookfield Asset Management Ltd. and is also now chair of the sports and entertainment company Two Circles Ltd.

== Personal life ==
Garfield is married with two sons.

Business positions
Preceded by Tony Wray	Chief Executive of Severn Trent	Succeeded by Incumbent
Preceded by Steve Robertson	Chief Executive of Openreach; April 2011 - February 2014	Succeeded by Joe Garner
