= Las Águilas Jungle Park =

Las Águilas-Jungle Park
- Interactive map of Las Águilas-Jungle Park
- 28°04′46″N 16°41′44″W
- Location: Tenerife
- Land area: 7.5 ha (19 acres)
- No. of animals: 500+
- Website: www.aguilasjunglepark.com/index.php?wlang=en

Las Águilas-Jungle Park is a zoological and botanical park located near the Los Cristianos beach on the Canary Island of Tenerife. Consisting of 7.5 hectares (19 acres) of jungle with over 500 animals, the park contains a number of walking paths with tunnels, suspension bridges, waterfalls, lagoons, and caves. The park also boasts daily flight shows featuring exotic birds and birds of prey.

Las Águilas-Jungle Park is operated by Spanish tourism group Aspro Ocio S.A. It is the largest such group operating in Europe and is better known for its chain of parks called Aqualand.

One of the park's main attractions are two white lions from South Africa; these make up a big cat collection that also includes leopards, jaguars, Bengal tigers, white tigers and pumas. The park also has a large primate collection, including orangutans, gibbons, chimpanzees, mandrills, lemurs, capuchin monkeys, titi monkeys and squirrel monkeys. The park's bird collection includes cranes, ibises, flamingos, swans, storks, parrots, macaws, vultures, falcons, eagles and penguins. Other animals in the zoo's collection include pygmy hippopotamuses, crocodiles, caimans, raccoons, red pandas and meerkats.

== Gallery ==
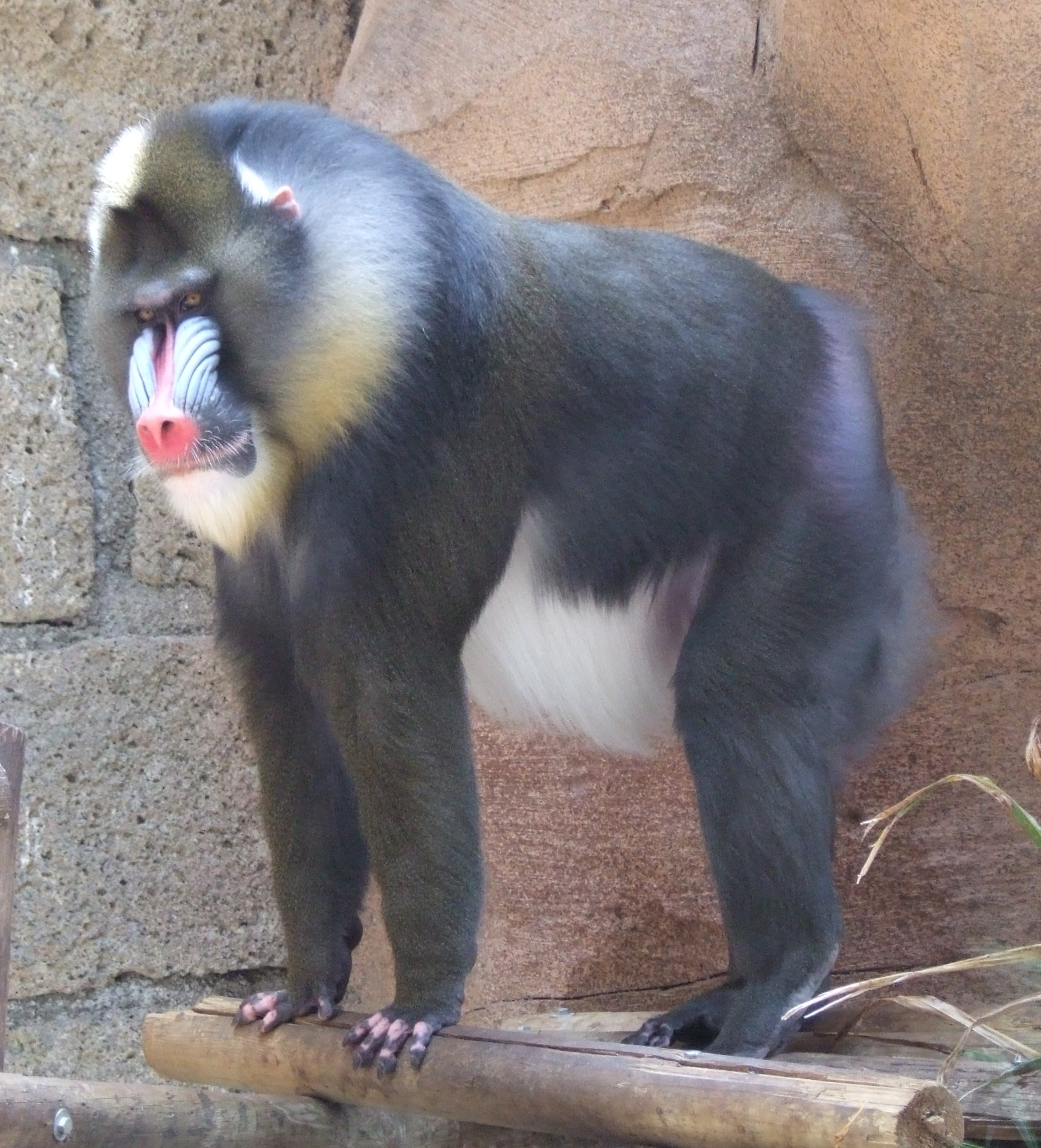
Mandrill

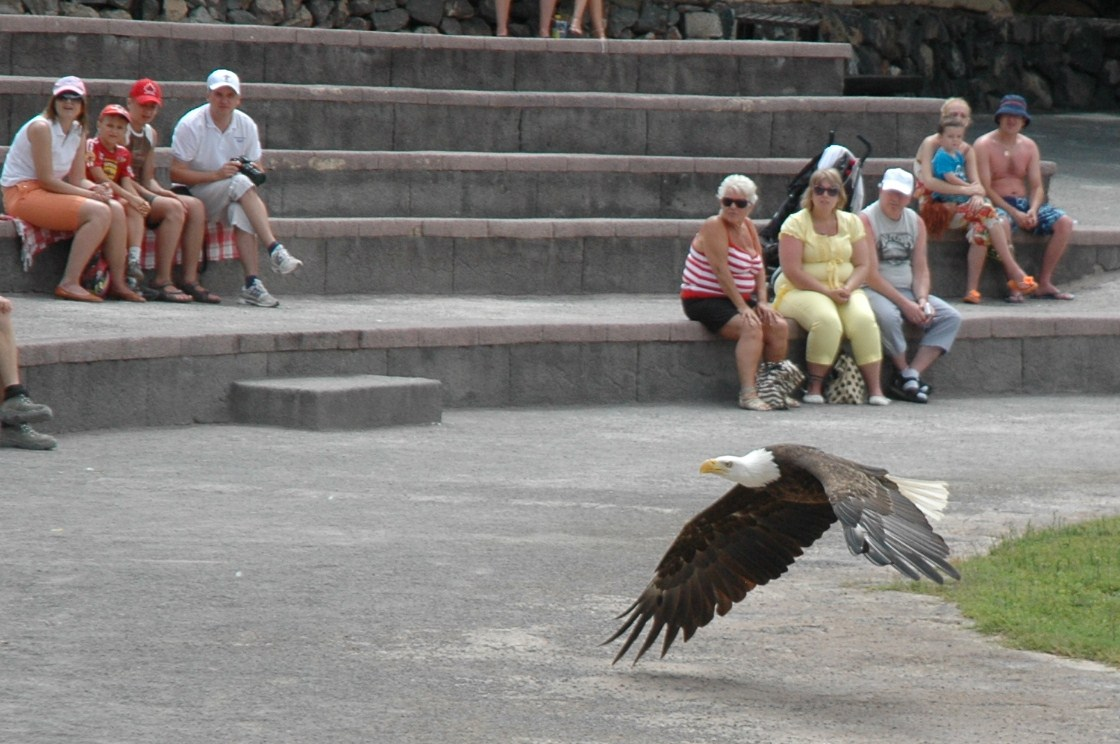
Bald eagle at a bird show

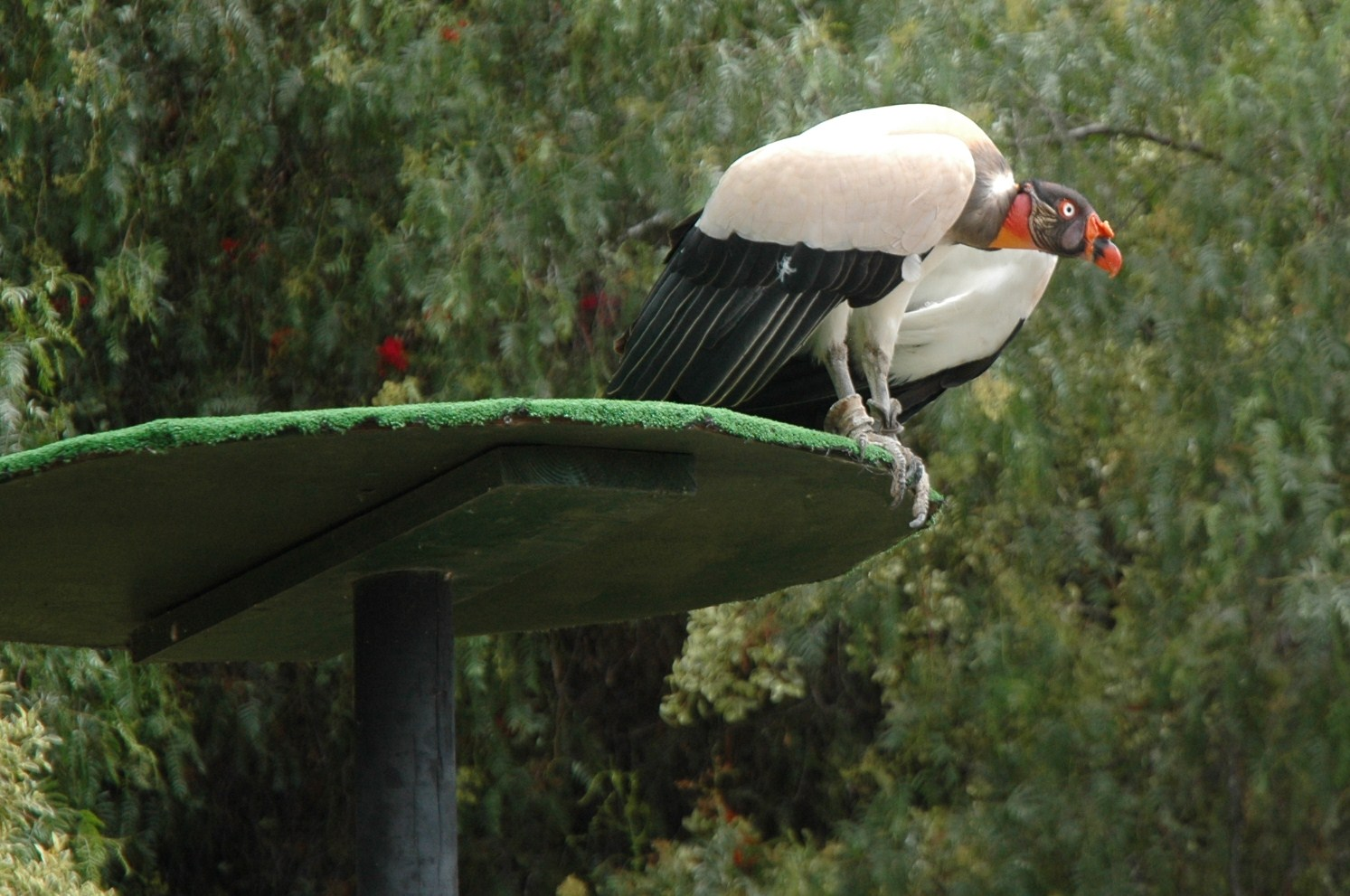
King vulture
