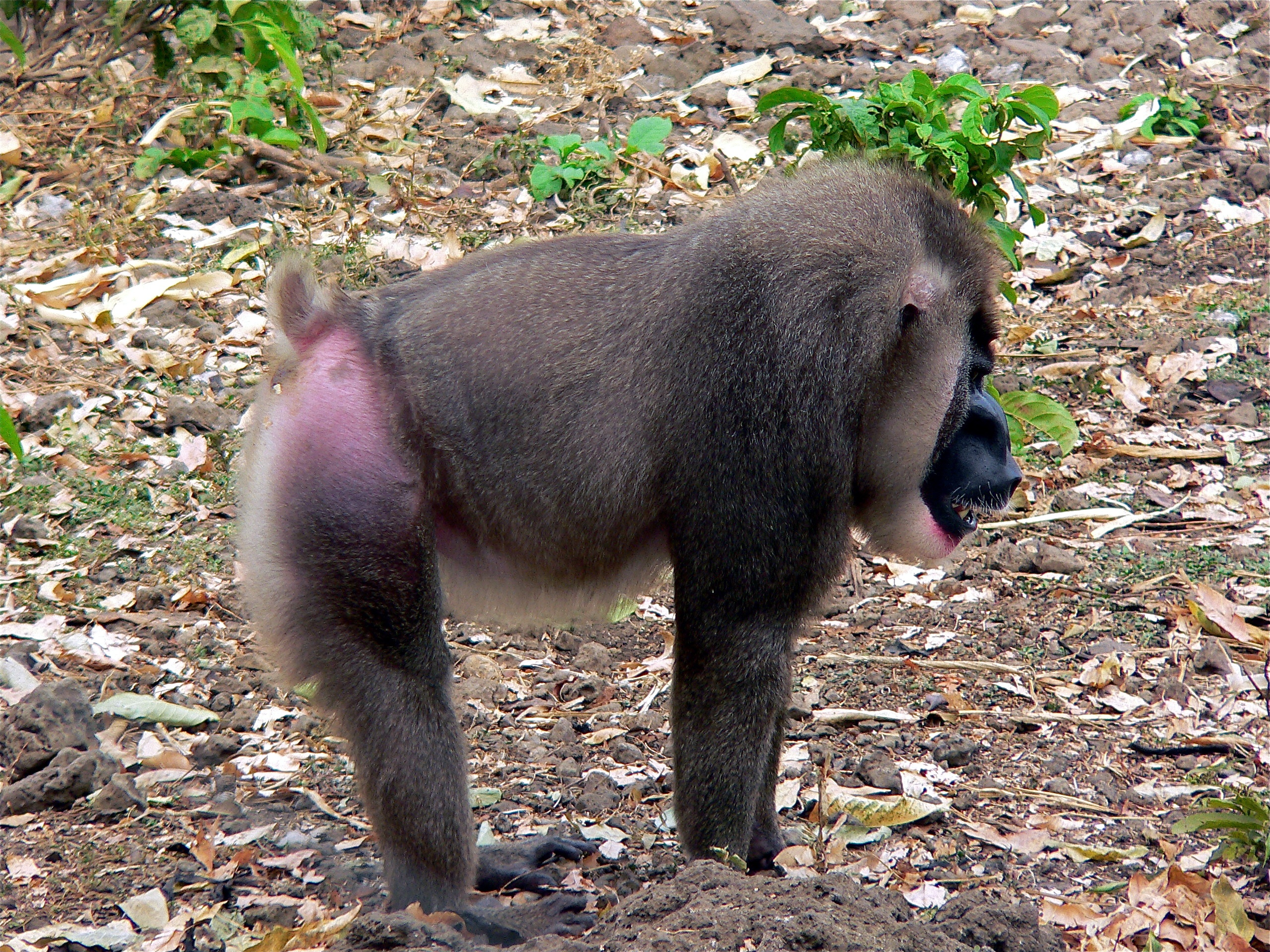
- Male at Limbe Wildlife Centre, Cameroon
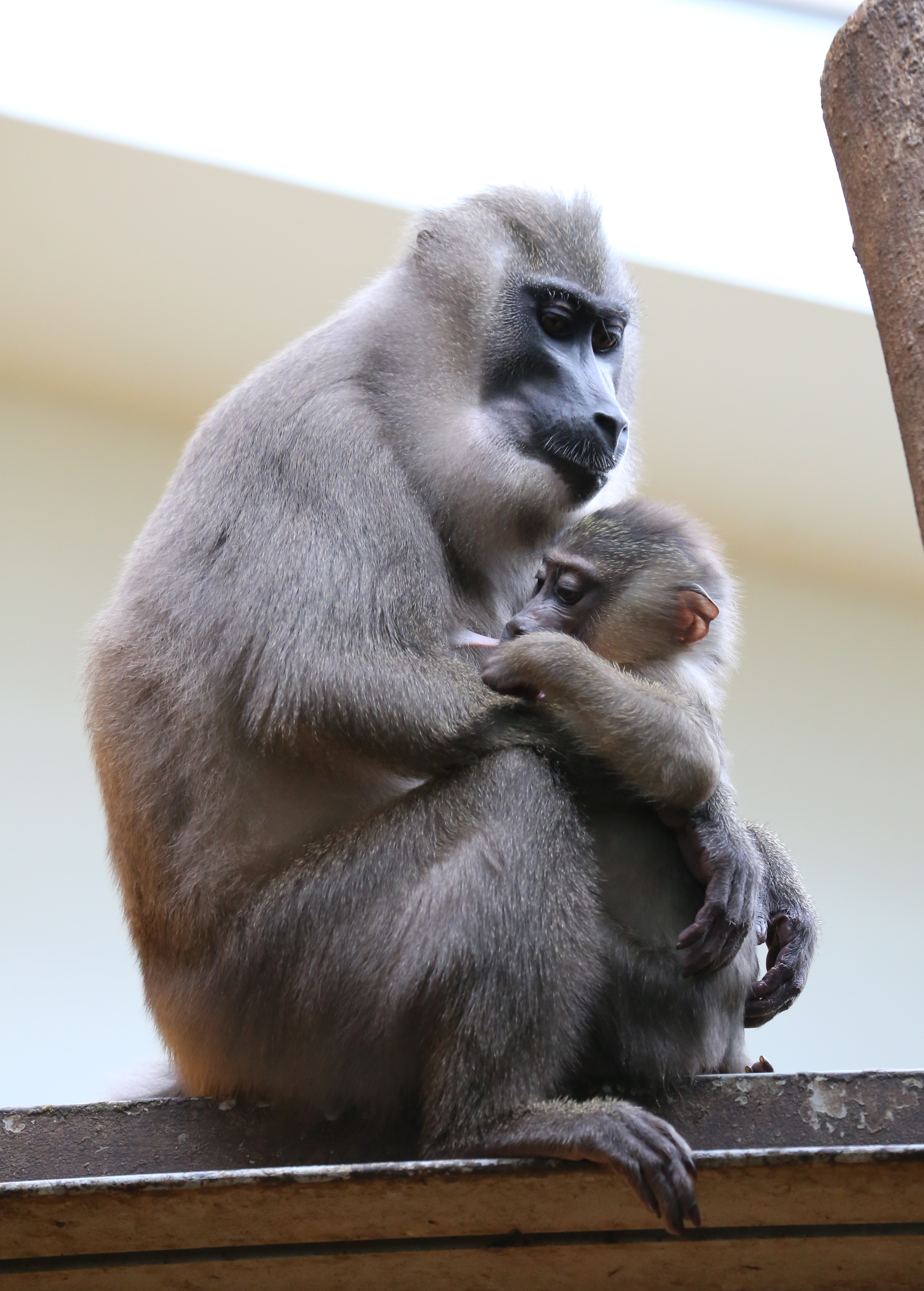
- Female with infant at Tierpark Hellabrunn in Munich, Germany

Conservation status
- Endangered (IUCN 3.1)
- CITES Appendix I

Scientific classification
- Kingdom: Animalia
- Phylum: Chordata
- Class: Mammalia
- Order: Primates
- Family: Cercopithecidae
- Genus: Mandrillus
- Species: M. leucophaeus

Binomial name
- Mandrillus leucophaeus (F. Cuvier, 1807)

Subspecies
- M. l. leucophaeus M. l. poensis
- Drill range

= Drill (animal) =

Species of primate

The drill (Mandrillus leucophaeus) is a primate of the family Cercopithecidae (Old World monkeys), related to baboons and even more closely to the mandrill. The average wild drill has a lifespan of 20 years. The drill is currently listed as an endangered species that occurs across three African countries.

== Distribution ==
The drill occurs in Nigeria, Cameroon, and Equatorial Guinea. Its geographical range varies from 19,000 to 20,000 km^{2} (7,500 to 7,700 mi^{2}). The area of occupancy is slightly smaller than the state of West Virginia, making a very small geographical home range. This range comprises populations that occur in fragmented pockets. These fragmented pockets of drills can be found as far south as the Sanaga River in Cameroon, and as far west as the Cross River in Nigeria. The total population of drills remaining in the wild is around 4,000 individuals. The drill lives in a variety of different habitats. The drills of Bioko Island live in lowland coastal forests and have even been observed on beaches along the coast. Other populations can be found in forests, savanna, mountain peaks, and inland cliffs.

== Taxonomy ==
Two subspecies of drill are accepted by some authorities but are not considered distinct by others:

- Mainland drill, Mandrillus leucophaeus leucophaeus
- Bioko drill, Mandrillus leucophaeus poensis

The closest relative to the drill is the mandrill (Mandrillus sphinx), found from southern Cameroon through mainland Equatorial Guinea (Rio Muni), Gabon and into the Congo. The two species are allopatric across the Sanaga River. The two species are next most closely related to the white-eyelid mangabeys of the genus Cercocebus.

The two species were at one point grouped into the baboon genus Papio. Through extensive genetic analyses they were identified as belonging to the genus Mandrillus.

== Size and weight ==
The drill is extremely sexually dimorphic with males exhibiting secondary sexual characteristics that females lack. Males are found to be significantly heavier and longer than females. Males weigh, on average, 32.3 kg (71 lb) and are 82 cm (32 in) in length. Females weigh, on average, 11.7 kg (26 lb) and are 66 cm (26 in) in length. Males are also found to have larger paranasal muzzle swelling than females. Paranasal muzzle swelling is the swelling on the muzzle of an animal around their nostrils. This is caused by enlarged paranasal sinuses or hollow spaces in the facial bone next to the nasal cavity. Muzzle swelling in males is independent of their body mass, while female's muzzle swelling is directly influenced by their mass. Paranasal swelling was found to be influenced by androgen production and steroid hormones produced by the reproductive organs in both males and females. Through this discovery researchers conclude that large muzzle swelling was indicative of male's reproductive quality and served as a reproductive signal in the drill. Male muzzle swellings may be related to dominance interactions, intimidation, and reproductive attraction.

== Description ==
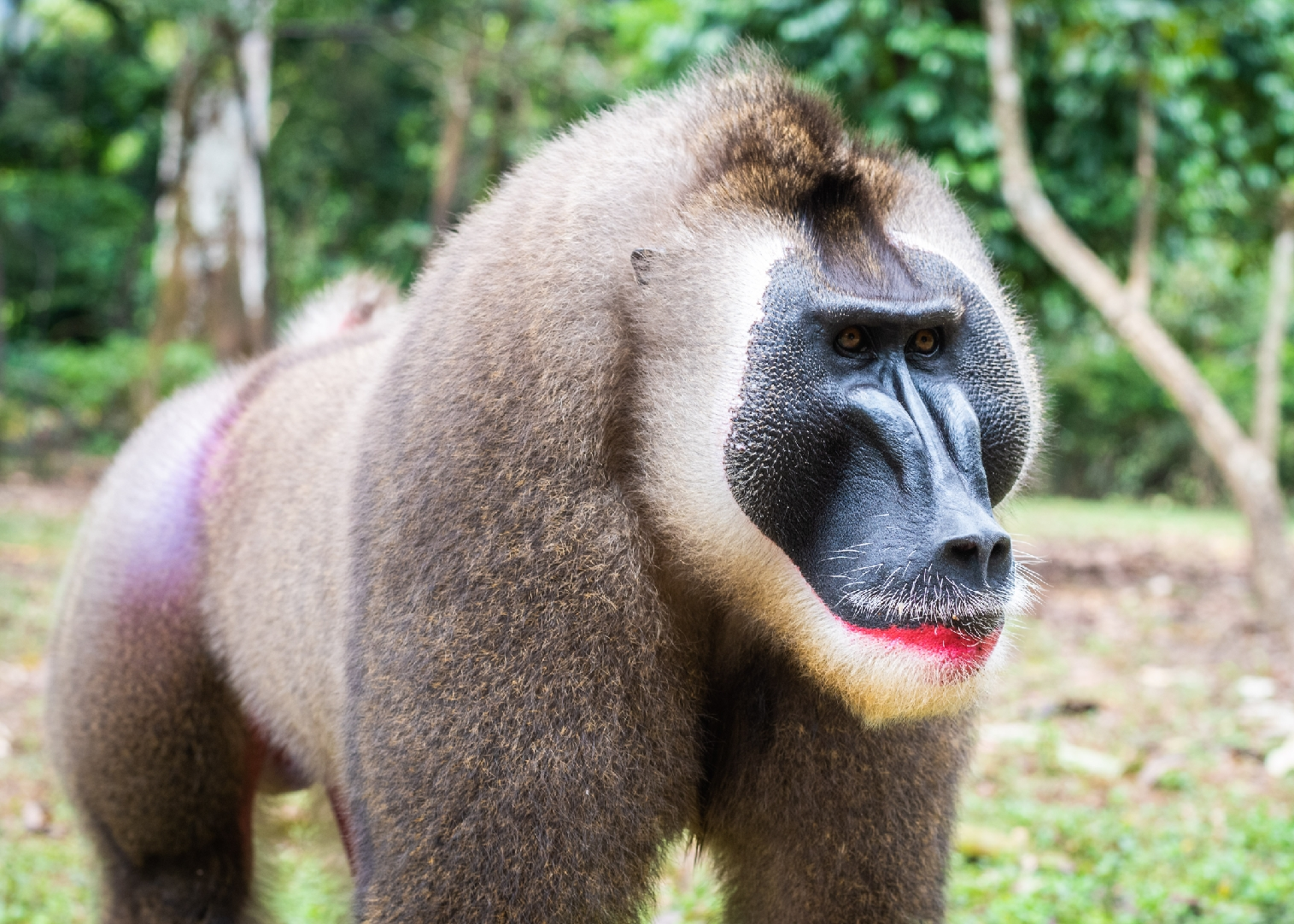
Male in Boki, Cross River

The drill is a large monkey with long extended snouts and a short tail. Its body is covered by brownish-gray hair in opposition to its black face. The fur around the face contains white fur.

The drill has sharp nasal ridges and large cheek pads on both sides of its face.

Canine teeth in males average 4.5 cm (1.8 in) in length and up to 5.08 cm (2.00 in), while average canines in femals are 1 cm (0.39 in). It also has hard molar teeth that are adapted to a wide range of food sources.

Males have vibrantly colored chins, rear, and groin areas. Their chin contains red markings and their rear and groin areas contain various colors of fur: red, blue, white, etc. These colorings have a direct link to the rank of males within a troop's social structure. Brightly colored males were found to have higher ranks within the troop. They were also observed to be the most sexually active within the troop. However researchers found that females don't exhibit a mating preference in regards to the brightness of male fur. This evidence suggests that male interactions are more affected by coloration differences that male-female interactions.

Females do not generally exhibit bright coloration of the chin, rear, and groin areas like their male counterparts. These areas are generally brown in color, like the rest of their body. However, when a female becomes pregnant or is ready to mate her groin area swells and turns bright red in color.

== Diet ==
The drill is an opportunistic omnivore. The drill dietary preference is that of fruiting trees, which are especially abundant during the rainy season. The most common fruit and plant species consumed by drills are fiddle-leaf figs, cola palms, and African corkwood trees. During seasons of less fruit abundance the drill will eat foods such as leaves and grasses. Generally, the drill's main diet is composed of seeds, plants, mushrooms, fruits, and even some invertebrate species. Ants provide a rich source of protein and are easily digestible by the drill due to its specialized gut and dental systems.

== Behavior ==
The drill is seasonal and semi-nomadic in nature. It is found to socialize most frequently at the times of dawn and dusk. Seasonally dependent migration may occur, where entire units travel to a new region for better access to resources. This migration is motivated by the seeking out of a warmer climate. The drill is semi-terrestrial and travels, usually, quadrupedally. Once a group reaches its desired destination, it remains in a range of around 1.93 mi^{2} (5.0 km^{2}) of its designated sleeping area. Individuals leave this sleeping area each day in order to search for food and other resources. At night they find shelter within trees, a behavior that aids in predator avoidance.

The drill spends most of its days foraging for ground prey or fallen foods. It also forages for fruits and flowers in trees. Due to its extensive time allocated to foraging it is provided with immense opportunities for mental stimulation, which is especially useful experience for juvenile and adolescent individuals.

The drill usually chooses to flee during an encounter with predators, rather than engage in physical fighting. It flees far up into the tree in order to minimize the risk of the predator succeeding. If the option of fleeing is not available, the drill will engage in direct physical fighting.

== Social organization ==
The drill lives in multi-male, multi-female troops. These troops contain anywhere from 15 to 75 individuals. Researchers have also observed the formation of much large groups, where 2 or more troops come together to form large groups that can be composed of over 100 individuals. The main composition of troops is that of females, followed by juveniles and adolescents. Males are less represented in troops, with a ratio of around 1 male for every 20 group members. Males in these groups will fight for dominance in order to control breeding opportunities within the troop. Males will also guard females they are or wish to mate with, which creates a clear monopoly on access to females. Individual male dominance in troops lasts around 3 years. Male dominance is decided through, in most cases, a series of physical displays. Often times these displays do not lead to physical violence, but in some cases fights occur and the winning male earns the respect of the troop, resulting in increased dominance within the group.

== Reproduction ==
The average gestation length for females is around 179 to 182 days. Upon the ending of gestation, a female will give birth to a single infant. Female drills are the primary caregivers for these infants; however juveniles play a significant role in parenting, more specifically when it comes to grooming and socializing with the infants.

Young drills are nursed until they are around 15-16 months old, when they are weaned. They then begin to become more independent due to reduced needs. As males grow older, they spend less time with their kin and become significantly more independent. The male will then eventually abandon his birth troop entirely in order to from a troop himself.

The time it takes for both sexes to reach sexual maturity is dimorphic. Females reach sexual maturity earlier, around the age of three, while males take longer, reaching sexual maturity around age six.

== Ecology ==
The drill is especially important for the ecosystem. It is a major seed disperser that disperses various plant and seed products throughout its range. This act of seed dispersing plays a crucial role in ecosystem health and can help boost the biodiversity of the area.

== Conservation ==
The drill is listed as an endangered species, facing threats from hunting, the pet trade, and human activities. Concern for drills began as early as 1962 for populations occurring in Nigeria, and 1968 for populations in Cameroon. Drills have a limited home range and are typically found in areas with high human populations, resulting in increased habitat loss, fragmentation, and degradation due to human influences. Habitat loss in their ranges is the result of forest clearing for agriculture, and large scale plantations. Commercial logging has also been found to be an immense risk for drills.

Field studies have been carried out in order to find the best way to conserve this species. The drill occurs and is protected in four national parks: Korup, Takamanda, Bakossi, and Mount Cameroon respectively. It is also protected in the Oban and Okwangowo Divisions of the Cross River National Park, Mbe Mountains forest, and the Afi Mountain Wildlife Sanctuary.
