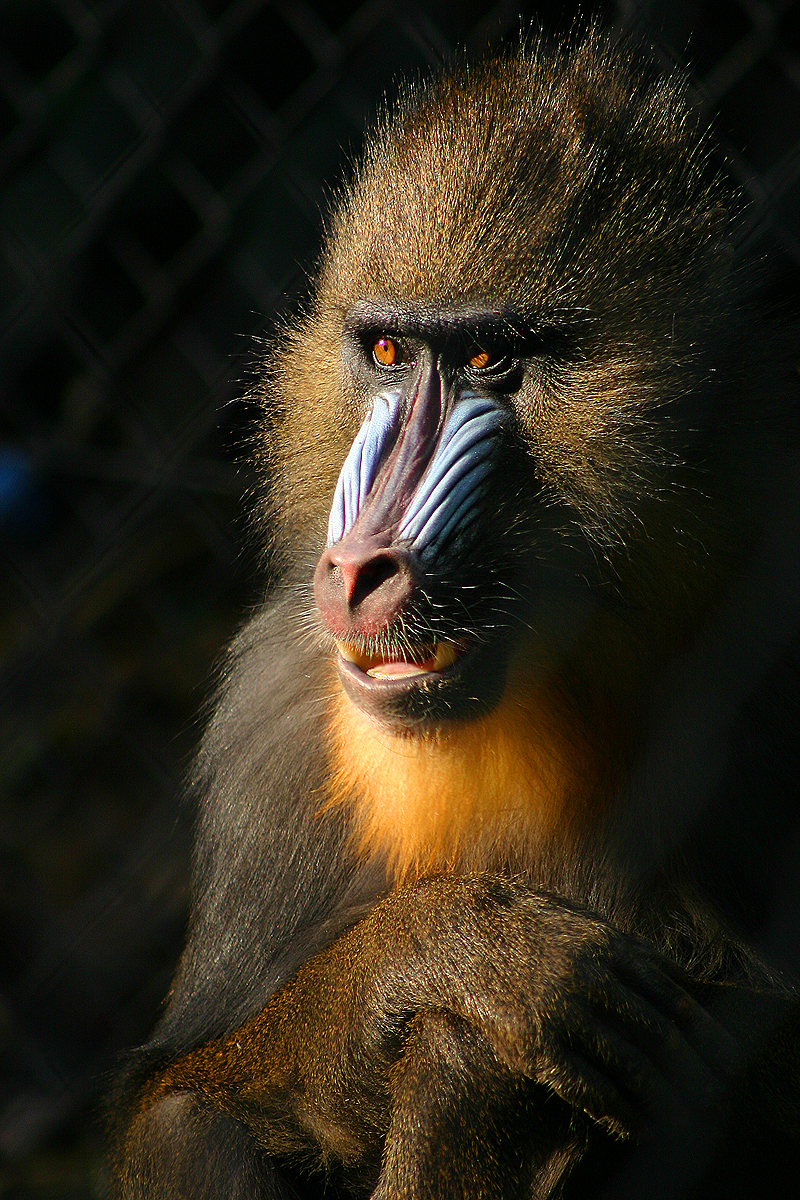
- A mandrill in captivity

Scientific classification
- Kingdom: Animalia
- Phylum: Chordata
- Class: Mammalia
- Infraclass: Placentalia
- Order: Primates
- Family: Cercopithecidae
- Tribe: Papionini
- Genus: Mandrillus; Ritgen, 1824

Type species
- Simia sphinx Linnaeus, 1758

Species
- M. sphinx (Linnaeus, 1758); M. leucophaeus (F. Cuvier, 1807)

Synonyms
- Chaeropithecus Gray, 1870; Drill Reichenbach, 1862; Maimon Trouessart, 1904; Mandril Voigt, 1831; Mormon Wagner, 1839; Papio P.L.S. Müller, 1773

= Mandrillus =

Genus of Old World monkeys

Mandrillus is a genus of large Old World monkeys distributed throughout central and southern Africa, consisting of two species: M. sphinx and M. leucophaeus, the mandrill and drill, respectively. Mandrillus, originally placed under the genus Papio as a type of baboon, is closely related to the genus Cercocebus. They are characterised by their large builds, elongated snouts with furrows on each side, and stub tails. Both species occupy the west central region of Africa and live primarily on the ground. They are frugivores, consuming both meat and plants, with a preference for plants. M. sphinx is classified as vulnerable and M. leucophaeus as endangered on the IUCN Red List of Threatened Species.

== Taxonomy ==
Mandrillus is a genus within the tribe Papionini, which in turn is under the subfamily Cercopithecinae. This subfamily is classified under the family of Old World monkeys (Cercopithecidae) within the infraorder Simiiformes. The Papionini tribe contains six other genera: baboons (Papio), macaques (Macaca), crested mangabeys (Lophocebus), white-eyelid mangabeys (Cercocebus), the highland mangabey (Rungwecebus) and Theropithecus.

Originally, both species were considered part of the Papio genus, as forest baboons, due to superficial similarities such as size and appearance, particularly in facial features. However, studies conducted analysing anatomical and genetic differences between the current Mandrillus and Papio genera showed more differences than similarities resulting in the current taxonomic ranking. Furthermore, the studies showed Mandrillus are more closely related to the white eyed mangabeys, and diverged relatively recently (4 million years ago) from this genus.

=== Species ===
Genus Mandrillus – Ritgen, 1824 – two species
Common name	Scientific name and subspecies	Range	Size and ecology	IUCN status and estimated population
Drill	M. leucophaeus (F. Cuvier, 1807) Two subspecies: M. l. leucophaeus (Mainland drill); M. l. poensis (Bioko drill)	Western Africa	Size: 61–77 cm (24–30 in) long, plus 5–8 cm (2–3 in) tail Habitat: Forest, savanna, and rocky areas Diet: Omnivorous, primarily fruit and seeds	EN 4,000
Mandrill	M. sphinx (Linnaeus, 1758)	Western Africa	Size: 55–95 cm (22–37 in) long, plus 7–10 cm (3–4 in) tail Habitat: Forest Diet: Fruit, seeds, fungi, roots, insects, snails, worms, frogs, and lizards, as well as snakes and small vertebrates	VU Unknown

== Anatomy ==
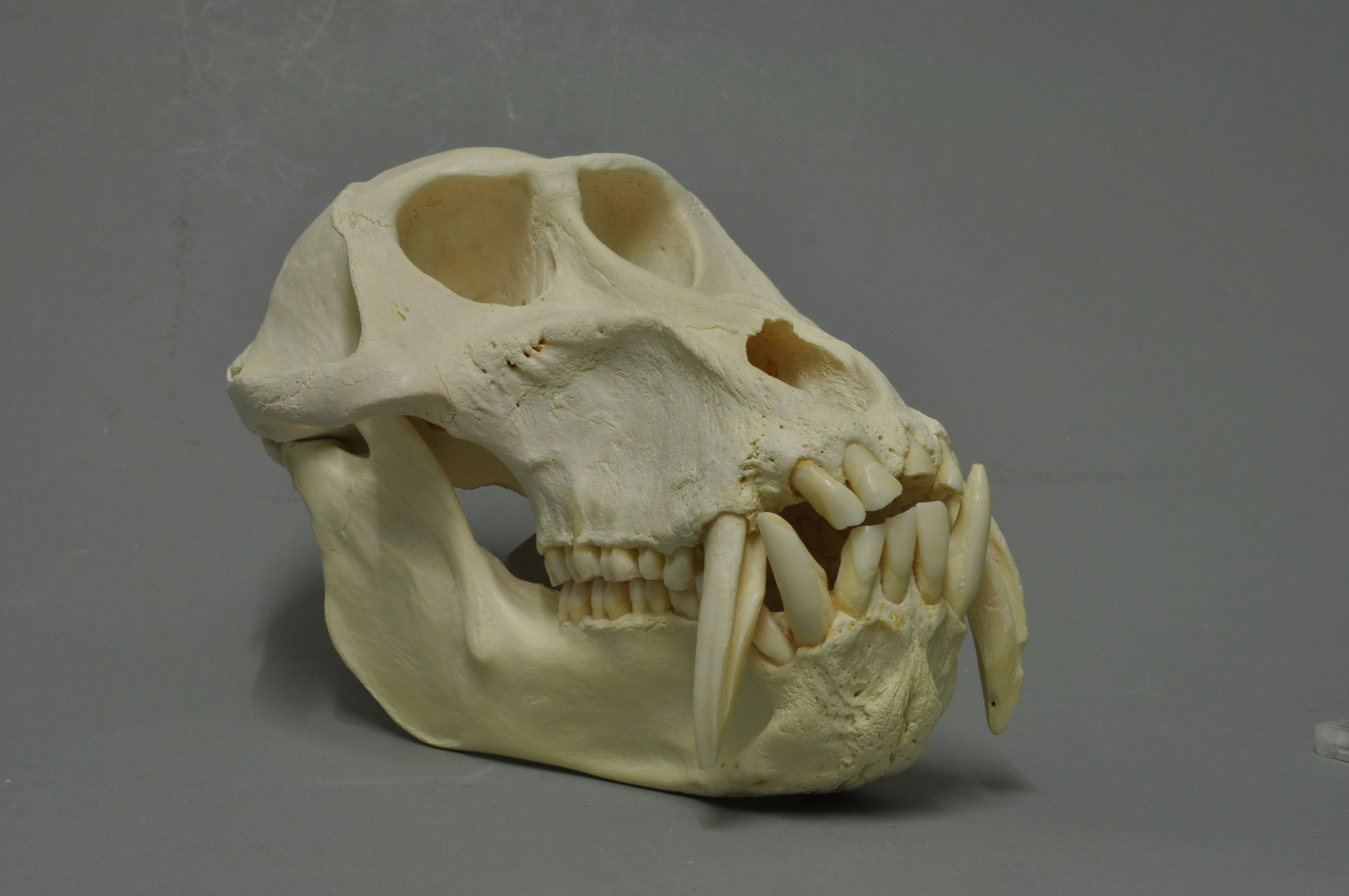
Mandrillus leucophaeus skull

Both species of Mandrillus develop extremely large muzzles, prominent nasal ridges and paranasal swelling (swelling in the area adjacent to the nostrils). The size and colour of the paranasal swellings correlate to male dominance and rank, while the size of nasal ridges is a way of attracting mates. Mandrillus teeth consist of two incisors, two premolars, one canine and three molars in each half of the upper and lower jaw, totalling 32 teeth. Furthermore Mandrillus display larger premolars and extended canines; these dental traits are better adapted to crushing hard objects. This is due to a large part of their diet consisting of hard, dry nuts and seeds that require greater crushing power and the use of their teeth in ripping apart rotting wood to search for insects and other invertebrates.

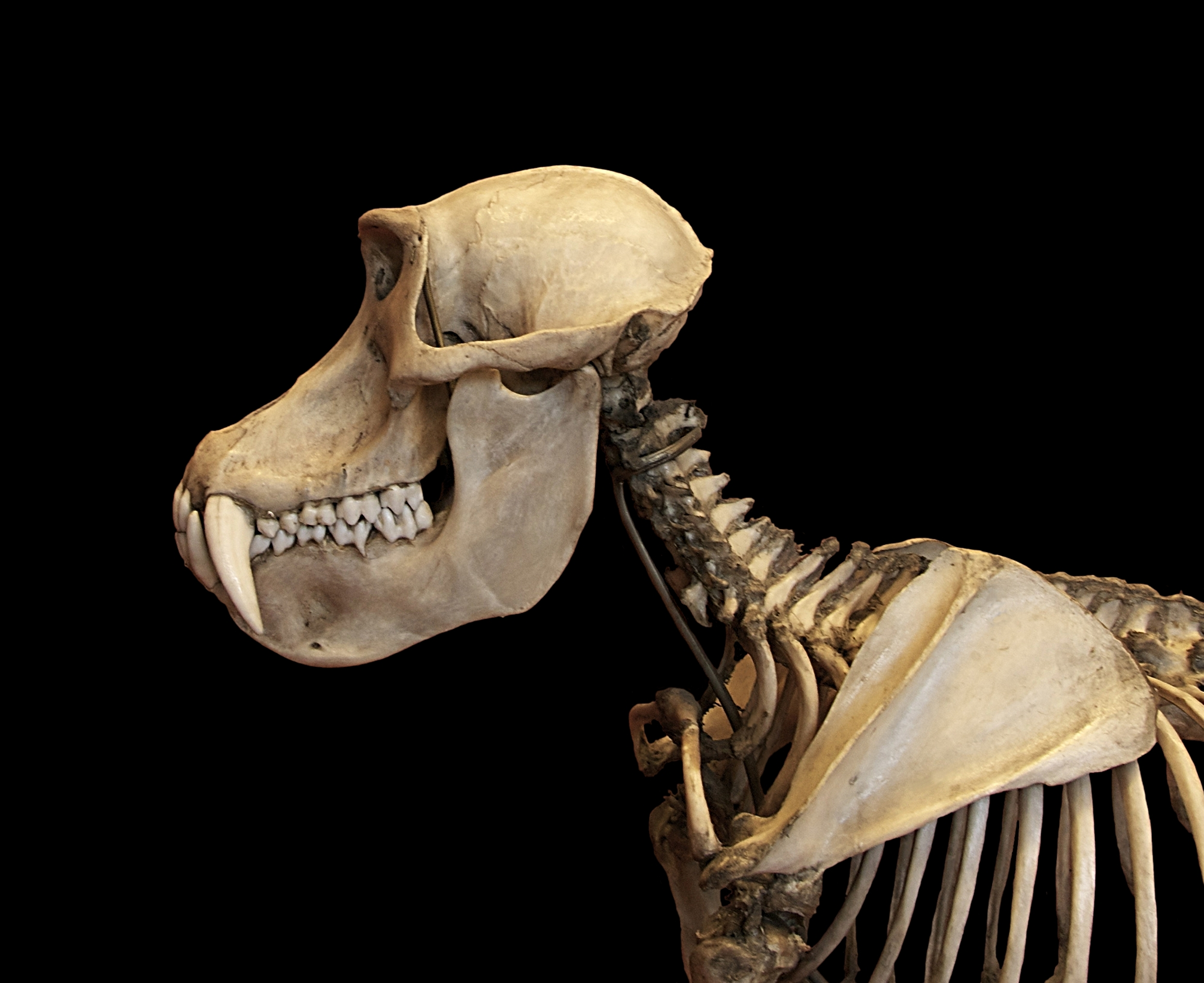
Mandrillus sphinx skull and shoulder blade

Within the shoulder and upper arm structures of the Mandrillus monkeys a deep scapular, broad deltoid plane, narrow stable elbow region and other skeletal features indicate the use of the forelimbs for climbing and foraging. This is used by the monkeys to climb trees when searching for ripe fruit and in the aggressive foraging of the forest floor in search of food. Mandrillus monkeys have developed an extremely broad and robust ilium, and a rounded tibial shaft. The development of these features can be attributed to the climbing of trees and quadrupedal locomotion. The largest toe is separated from the remaining toes for increased grasping power when climbing trees.

=== Sexual dimorphism ===
Both species of Mandrillus demonstrate a great degree of sexual dimorphism in weight, anatomy and physical appearance. The mandrill displays the most extreme sexual dimorphism for weight among all primates, with a male-female weight ratio of 3.2 – 3.4 at eight to ten years of age. Similarly, drills are one of the most sexually dimorphic primates for body weight, with a male growing up to 32 kg while a female grows to 12 kg. Sexual dimorphism is also displayed in the growth of the craniofacial bones of both species. The males of each species have longer muzzles, much larger paranasal swellings and longer canines than their female counterparts. In a study of wild drills, female muzzles only grew up to 70% the length of the male muzzles. Furthermore, males have brightly coloured, saturated rumps unlike their female counterparts. Both species also display the greatest visual sexual dimorphism within monkeys. On a scale based on rating the differences in physical features between genders, the mandrill obtained 32 whilst the drill obtained 24.5. These ratings are based on features such as the saturation and colour of the rump (and face for mandrills), the paranasal swelling, the fatted rump and fur colouring.

== Distribution and habitat ==
Mandrillus monkeys have a very localised biographical region located in West central Africa. The two species are often considered allopatric, they occupy non-overlapping regions, and their regions are divided by a physical barrier, the Sanaga river in Cameroon. Mandrillus leucophaeus occupy the area above the river in North western Cameroon and southwestern Nigeria up until the Cross River, and Bioko Island (Equatorial Guinea) which lies off the coast. The mandrill occupies the area below the river line in Cameroon, Río Muni, Gabon and Congo. The Mandrillus species occupy multiple sections of the Guinean forests of West Africa, including Cross–Sanaga–Bioko coastal forests and Cameroonian Highlands forests. The forests the monkeys occupy have a humid, tropical climate and rugged terrain. Deforestation has reduced the habitat of both Mandrillus species, reducing the distribution of each species, especially the drill.

== Behaviour ==
=== Diet ===
Both Mandrillus species are frugivores, consuming both plants and insects with a preference for fruits and nuts. Mandrillus species spend a large amount of their time foraging through the forest in search of food. In a study conducted in Cameroon, approximately 84% of the faecal matter of mandrills consisted of fruit. Similarly, a study done on drills in southwest Cameroon showed that the mean weight of fruit and seed in faecal matter was equal to or greater than 80%. Seasonal changes can be seen within Mandrillus diet, during peak fruit season (September to March) their diet consisted mostly of fruit, pulp and seeds whilst during the fruit scarce season (June to August) there was a great increase in the consumption of insects, woody tissue and especially nuts. There was also an increase in the variation of the diet during the fruit-scarce season. Important fruit include but are not limited to, the fruit of the bush mango (Irvingia gabonensis), African Corkwood tree (Musanga cecropioides), Grewia coriacea, Sacoglottis gabonensis and Xylopia aethiopica. Invertebrates consumed include crickets, ants, caterpillars and termites. Rarely, Mandrillus monkeys will eat larger animals, such as rats and gazelles when presented with the opportunity.

=== Social systems ===
The species of the genus exhibit great similarities in their social systems. Both generally form smaller groups, however the size of these groups is unclear. A study done on drills in southwest Cameroon found a mean group size of 52.3 while another more recent report stated a figure of 25–40 on these smaller groups. A study of mandrills done at Campo reserve in Cameroon found small groups contain 14 - 95 individuals. These smaller groups, with stable social structures, often join to form larger "supergroups" of hundreds of individuals. Some of the largest mandrill "supergroups" reported contained up to 845 individuals whilst some of the largest drill "supergroups" reported contained 400 individuals. There have been reports of solitary male Mandrillus monkeys, however this occurs very rarely.

The social structures and social hierarchy of Mandrillus "supergroups" and groups is highly contentious. There are multiple older (1970s-1990s) sources referencing single male units, which contained a male and multiple female monkeys, as the smallest and most common stable social structure. However this has been disproved with the discovery of less colourful male Mandrillus and further observations of behaviour. Mandrillus leucophaeus social structures are unknown, due to low populations, and secluded habitats with dense forestry. On the other hand, Mandrillus sphinx has had a variety of studies on social structure done in largely captive and semi-free ranging settings, with few studies on wild mandrills. The current studies on mandrills are inconclusive, and present different results. Various semi-free ranging studies conducted report a matrilineal social structure with a stable infant and female mandrill "supergroup". Male Mandrillus monkeys would disperse from this group when old enough and join other groups only during mating season. Further studies, also done in semi-free ranging settings, conclude that dominant females are central to group cohesion and connectivity (how close they remained). Conversely, a study on wild mandrills published in 2015 reported that a stable adult, male mandrill population of 5 - 6 was present year round in "supergroups". This aligned with the social structures reported in other research papers done on wild mandrills, where stable multi-male and multi-female groups were found. This difference in social structures between Mandrillus groups has been attributed to limitations in observing wild mandrills, differing habitats, and differing sample sizes.

Male dominance and rank have been linked to the colouration and colour extension of the rumps, greater saturation and colour extension correlated to higher-ranking males. Males of higher ranking are more likely to associate with females, especially those with sexual skin swelling, and more likely to successfully mount females. Dominant, adult males practice mate guarding on adult females during times of maximal skin swelling; with their high competitive ability they are more likely to successfully reproduce. Due to the tropical habitat, mating season coincides with the dry season (May to October) and birth season coincides with the wet season (November to April).

=== Communication ===
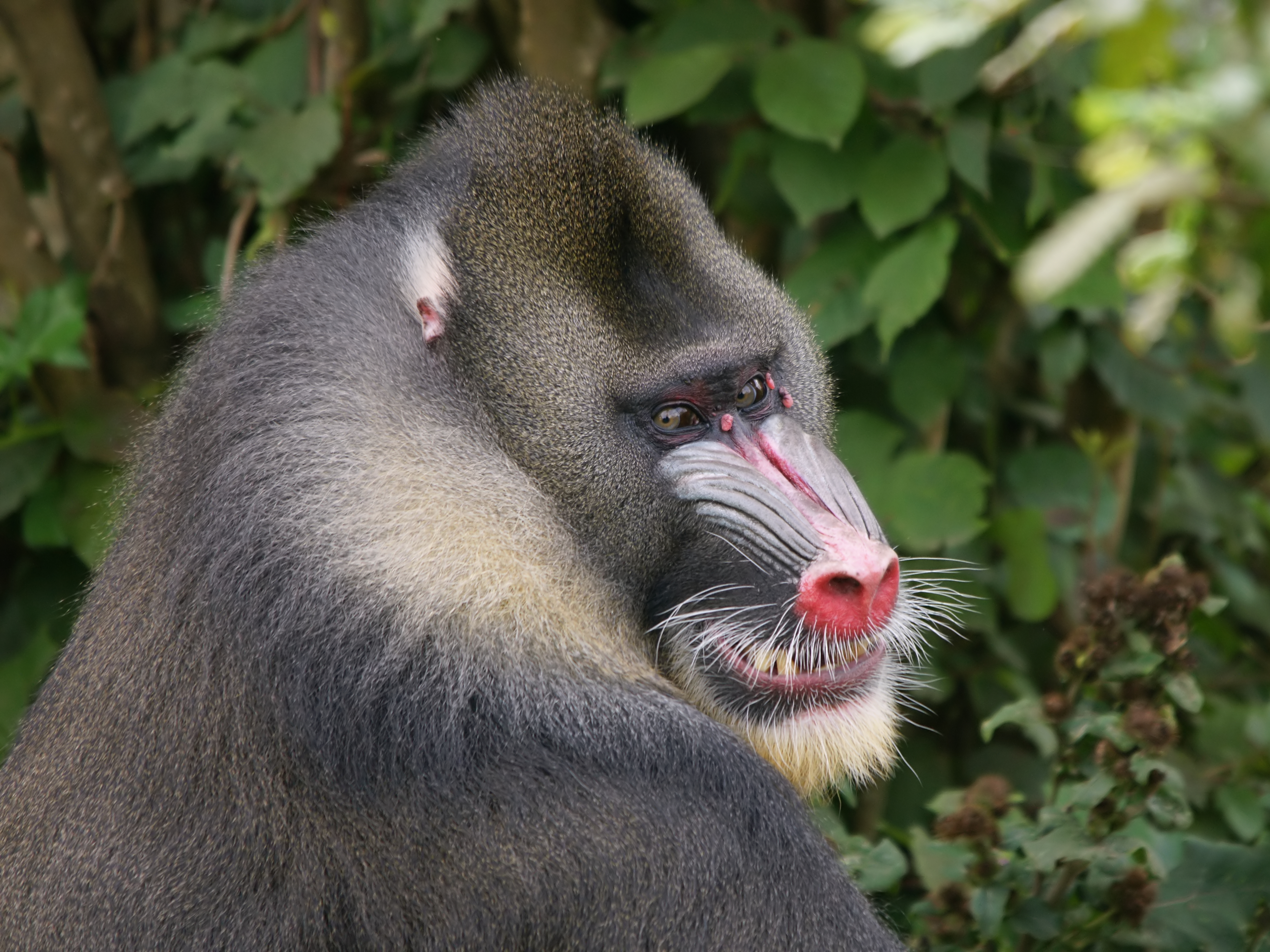
Mandrill displaying silent baring of teeth

The Mandrillus genus uses both visual and vocal forms of communication, which are extremely similar or identical across both species. Both species have three identical long-range vocal communications: two-phase grunts, roars and "crowling". The two-phased grunt is a low, two-syllable continuous sound used exclusively by adult males during calm group progression and mate guarding. Roars are single low, single syllable sounds used exclusively by males in the same context as two-phase grunts. Crowling is used by infants and females during group movement or foraging to call together the dispersed group.

They also use numerous short-range vocal sounds for various purposes. The "yak" and grinding of teeth are used during tense situations. The grunt is used in aggressive situations and screams are used to escape or while experiencing fear. The growl is used to convey mild alarm, the K-alarm is used to convey intense alarm and the "girney" is used for appeasement. Both species use various facial expressions to communicate with each other. The silent baring of teeth is a positive visual signal conveying peaceful intentions, and it is often combined with a shaking head. Staring open-mouthed is a display of aggression, frowning with bare teeth is used to encourage submission, staring with bare teeth can communicate aggression or fear, pouting signals submission and a relaxed open mouth encourages playing.

== Conservation status ==
The current conservation status of Mandrillus sphinx is vulnerable and that for Mandrillus leucophaeus is endangered. The greatest threats to the conservation of this genus are the severe loss and degradation of their habitat, and hunting. The loss of habitat is an ongoing threat that can be attributed to the expansion of human settlements as well as the clearing of forests for chipping factories and agriculture. Hunting and poaching of Mandrillus monkeys for meat or to protect crops is also major, ongoing threat to the population despite the implementation of hunting restrictions and sanctuaries. The drill population in Cameroon, which encompasses 80% of the drill's original habitat, has been fragmented into smaller, isolated populations with largest residing in Korup national park. The mandrill population in south Cameroon and Equatorial Guinea are at great risk due to extensive forest loss. The majority of the mandrill population remains in Gabon and faces major threats from railroad construction and logging companies. As of 2020, the mandrill population is in decline while the drill population is not able to be accurately determined.

== Sources ==
- Kingdon, Jonathan (2015). The Kingdon Field Guide to African Mammals (Second ed.). Bloomsbury Publishing. ISBN 978-1-4729-2531-2.
