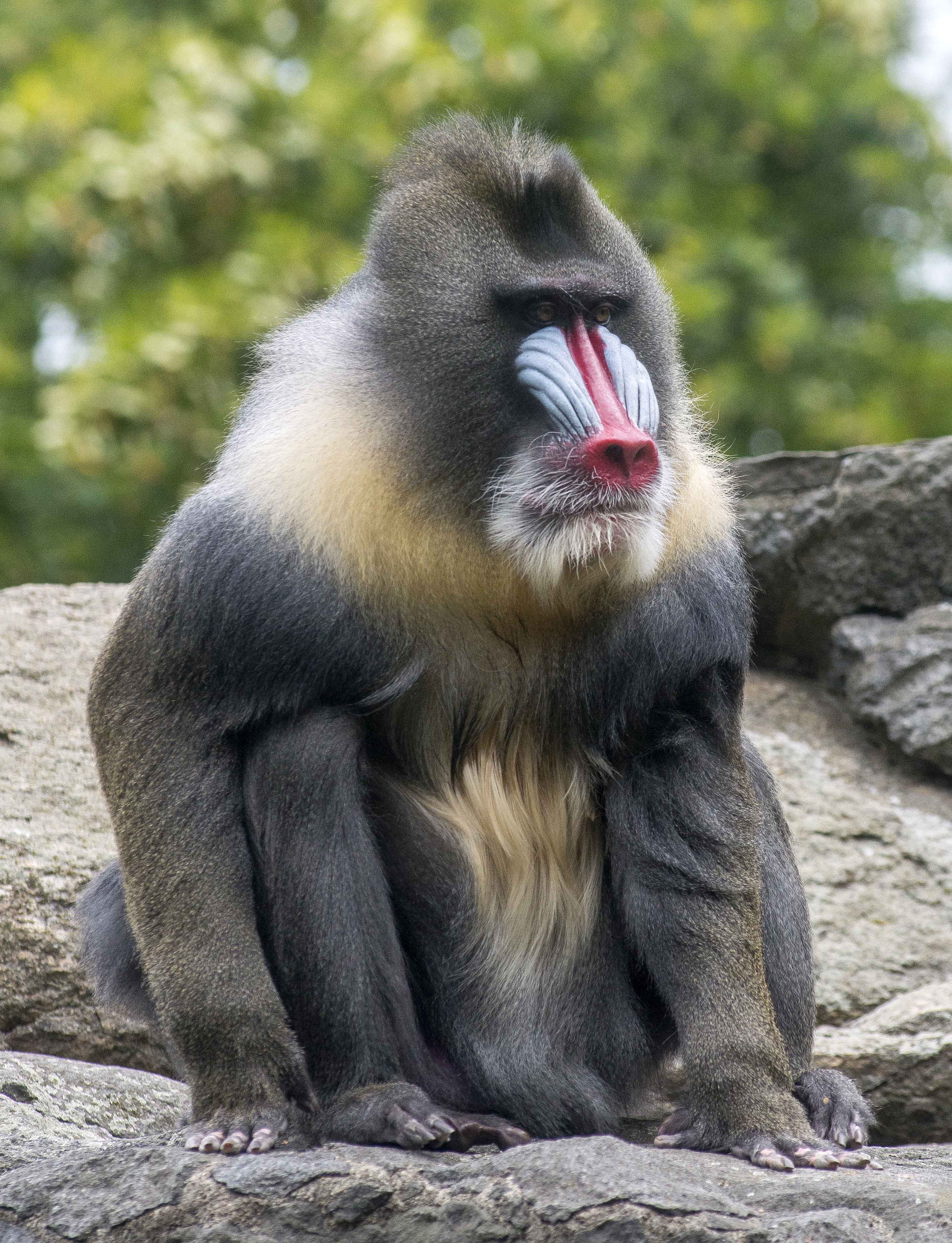
- Male mandrill at Berlin Zoological Garden

Conservation status
- Vulnerable (IUCN 3.1)
- CITES Appendix I

Scientific classification
- Kingdom: Animalia
- Phylum: Chordata
- Class: Mammalia
- Order: Primates
- Family: Cercopithecidae
- Genus: Mandrillus
- Species: M. sphinx

Binomial name
- Mandrillus sphinx (Linnaeus, 1758)
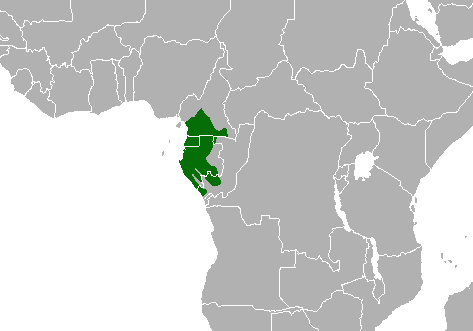
- Mandrill distribution

Synonyms
- Simia sphinx Linnaeus, 1758

= Mandrill =

Species of Old World monkey from Africa

The mandrill (Mandrillus sphinx) is a large Old World monkey native to west central Africa. It is one of the most colorful mammals in the world, with red and blue skin on its face and posterior. The species is sexually dimorphic, as males have a larger body, longer canine teeth and brighter coloring. Its closest living relative is the drill, with which it shares the genus Mandrillus. Both species were traditionally thought to be baboons, but further evidence has shown that they are more closely related to white-eyelid mangabeys.

Mandrills mainly live in tropical rainforests but will also travel across savannas. They are active during the day and spend most of their time on the ground. Their preferred foods are fruit and seeds, but mandrills will consume leaves, piths, mushrooms, and animals from insects to juvenile bay duiker. Mandrills live in large, stable groups known as "hordes" which can number in the hundreds. Females form the core of these groups, while adult males are solitary and only reunite with the larger groups during the breeding season. Dominant males have the most vibrant colors and fattest flanks and rumps, and have the most success siring young.

The mandrill is classified as vulnerable on the IUCN Red List. Its biggest threats are habitat destruction and hunting for bushmeat. Gabon is considered the stronghold for the species. Its habitat has declined in Cameroon and Equatorial Guinea, while its range in the Republic of the Congo is limited.

== Etymology ==
The word mandrill is derived from the English words man and drill—the latter meaning 'baboon' or 'ape' and being West African in origin—and dated to 1744. The name appears to have originally referred to chimpanzees. The first scholar to record the name for the colorful monkey was Georges-Louis Buffon in 1766. It was called the "tufted ape", "great baboon" and "ribbernosed baboon" by Thomas Pennant in A Synopsis of Quadrupeds (1771) and A History of Quadrupeds (1781).

== Taxonomy ==
The mandrill was first scientifically depicted in Historia animalium (1551–1558) by Conrad Gessner, who considered it a kind of hyena. The species was formally classified by Carl Linnaeus as Simia sphinx in 1758. Its current generic name Mandrillus was coined by Ferdinand Ritgen in 1824.

Historically, some scientists placed the mandrill and the closely related drill (M. leucophaeus) in the baboon genus Papio. Morphological and genetic studies in the late 20th and early 21st centuries found a closer relationship to white-eyelid mangabeys of the genus Cercocebus. Some have even proposed that the mandrill and drill belong to Cercocebus. Two genetic studies in 2011 clarified Mandrillus and Cercocebus as separate sister lineages. The two genera split around 4.5 million years ago (mya) while the mandrill and drill split approximately 3.17 mya. Fossils of Mandrillus have not been found.

Phylogeny of Mandrillus among related genera

Based on 54 genes

- Papionini
  - Macaca
  - - - Mandrillus
      - Cercocebus
    - - Theropithecus
      - - Papio
        - Lophocebus

Based on mitochondrial DNA

- Papionini
  - - Macaca
    - - Mandrillus
      - Cercocebus
  - - Lophocebus
    - - Theropithecus
      - Papio

Some authorities have divided mandrill populations into subspecies: the northern mandrill (M. s. sphinx) and the southern mandrill (M. s. madarogaster). A proposed third subspecies, M. s. insularis, was based on the mistaken belief that mandrills are present on Bioko Island. The consensus is that mandrills belong to one subspecies (M. s. sphinx).

Cytochrome-b sequences suggest that mandrill populations north and south of the Ogooué River split 800,000 years ago and belong to distinct haplogroups. This divergence appears to have also led to the splitting of the mandrill strain of the simian immunodeficiency virus (SIV). The draft (incomplete) genome of the mandrill was published in 2020, with a reported genome size of 2.90 giga–base-pairs and high levels of heterozygosity.

== Characteristics ==
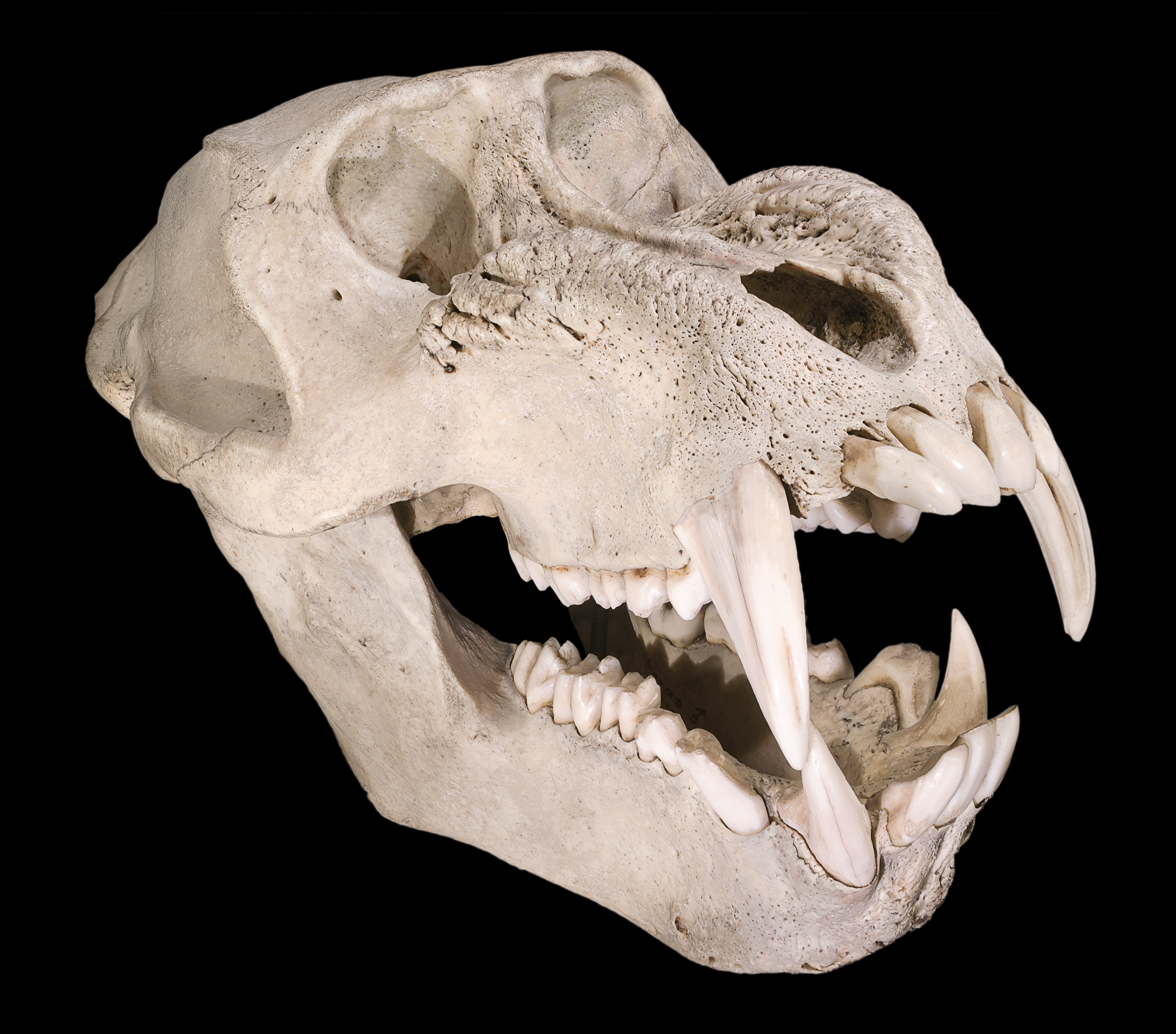
Skull of male mandrill, showing the long canines and ridged bone swellings

The mandrill has a stocky body with a large head and muzzle, as well as a short and stumpy tail. The limbs are evenly sized and the fingers and toes are more elongated than those in baboons, with a more opposable big toe on the feet. The mandrill is the most sexually dimorphic primate, and it is the largest monkey. Females are less stocky and have shorter, flatter snouts. Males have a 70–95 cm (28–37 in) head-body length and weigh 19–30 kg (42–66 lb) while females have a 55–70 cm (22–28 in) head-body length and weigh 10–15 kg (22–33 lb). Most of the teeth are larger in males, and the canine teeth reach up to 4.5 cm (1.8 in) and 1 cm (0.39 in) long for males and females respectively. Both sexes have 7–10 cm (2.8–3.9 in) long tails.

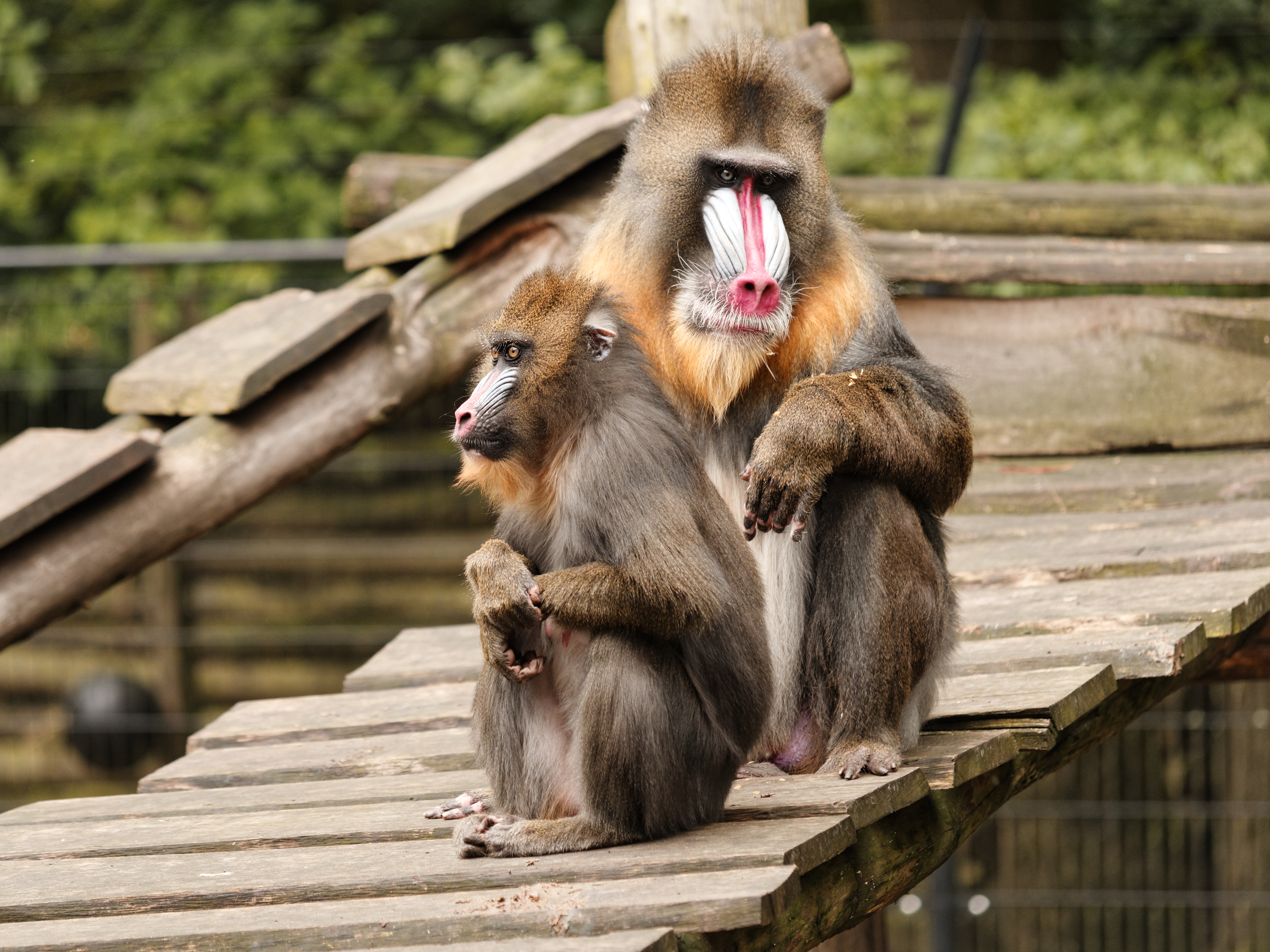
Male and female mandrills, showing size and color dimorphism

The coat of the mandrill is primarily grizzled or banded olive-brown with a yellow-orange beard and sparse, light hairs on its underside. The lips are surrounded by stiff white whiskers, and white bare skin exists behind the ears. Male mandrills have a "crest" of long hairs on the head and neck, while both sexes have chest glands which are covered by long hairs. The face, rump and genitals have less hair. The mandrill has a red line running down the middle of their face which connects to their red nose. On either side of the line, the skin is blue and grooved. In males, the blue skin is supported by ridged bone swellings. Females have more subdued facial coloring, but this can vary between individuals with some having stronger red and blue hues and others being darker or almost black. In males, the rump and areas around the genitals are multi-colored, consisting of red, pink, blue and purple skin, with a red penis shaft and violet scrotum. The genital and anal areas of the female are red.

The mandrill is among the most colorful mammals. Charles Darwin wrote in The Descent of Man: "no other member of the whole class of mammals is coloured in so extraordinary a manner as the adult male mandrill". The red coloration is created by blood vessels near the surface of the skin, while the blue is a form of structural coloration caused by parallel arrangements of collagen fibers. The blue ridges on males contrast with both the red facial hues and the green foliage of their environment, helping them stand out to other individuals. The darker and more subdued coloring of female faces is caused by melanin.

== Ecology ==
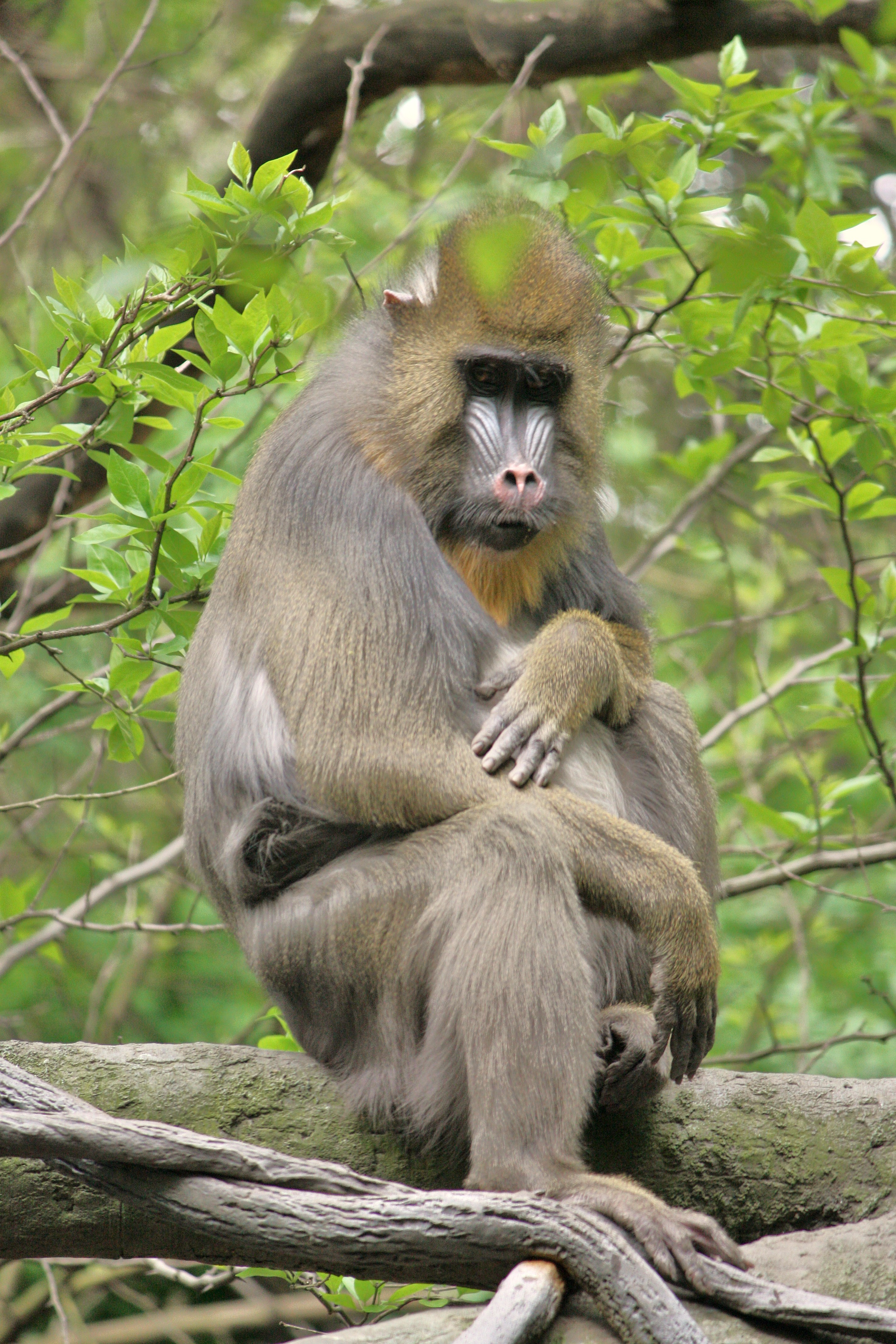
Female mandrill sitting in tree

The mandrill lives in west-central Africa, including southern Cameroon, mainland Equatorial Guinea (Río Muni), Gabon and parts of the Republic of the Congo. Its range is bounded by the Sanaga River to the north and the Ogooué and Ivindo Rivers to the east. It does not appear to share habitat with the drill, as the two species are separated by the Sanaga River. Mandrills live in tropical rainforests, generally preferring primary forests over secondary forests. They also live in patchy gallery forests surrounded by savanna and travel across grass areas within their forest habitats. They have also been recorded in mountainous areas, near rivers and in cultivated fields.

Mandrills prefer thick bush dominated by perennial plants like gingers and plants of the genera Brillantaisia and Phaulopsis. They mainly dwell on the ground, but feed as high as the canopy. Both mandrills and drills are more arboreal than baboons. Mandrills may aggregate or compete with other primates such as talapoins, guenons, mangabeys, black-and-white colobuses, chimpanzees, and gorillas.

=== Diet ===
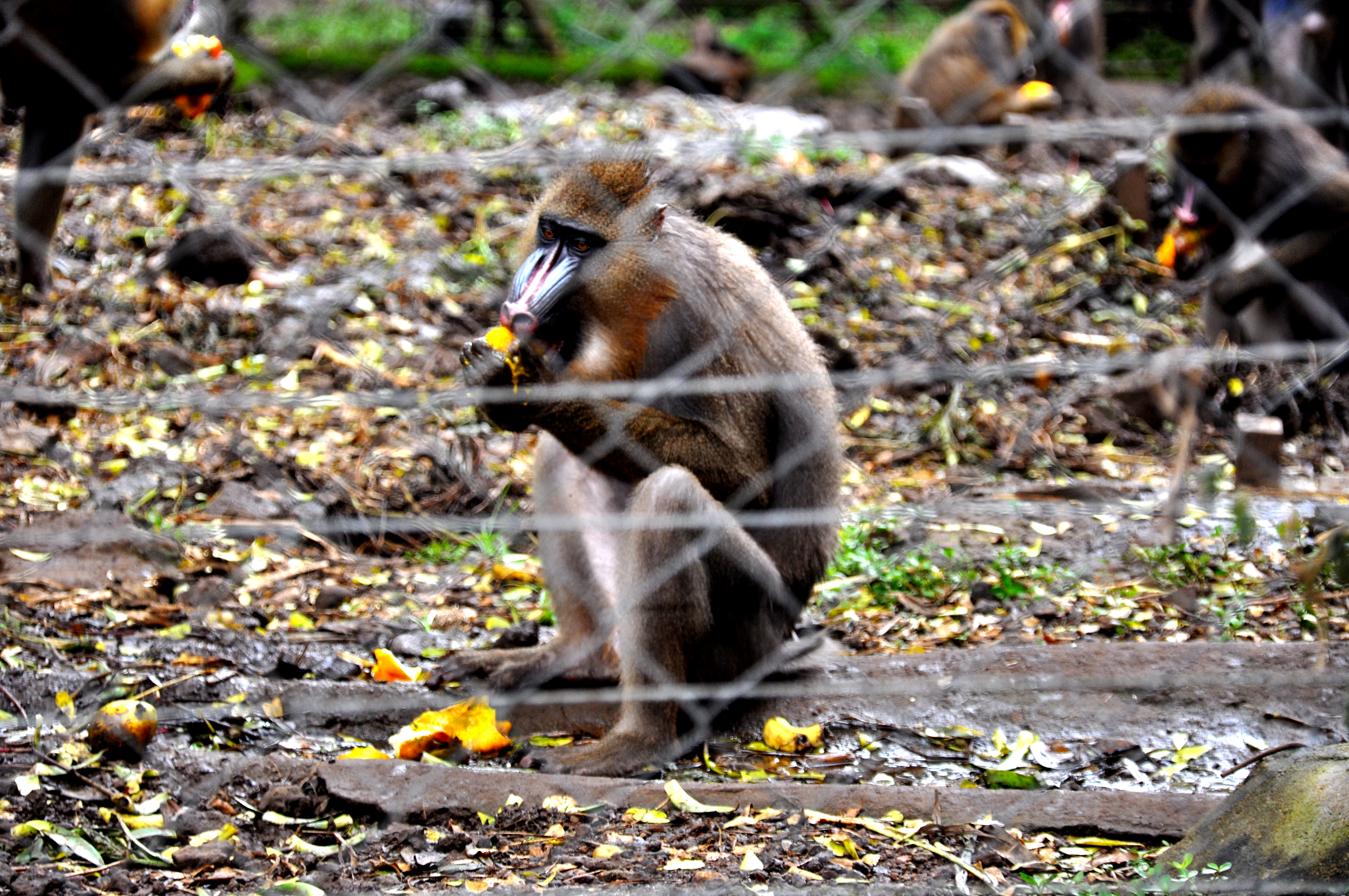
Mandrills eating fruit

The mandrill is an omnivore. The core of its diet consists of plants, of which it eats over a hundred species. In Lopé National Park, the mandrill's diet was composed of fruit (50.7%), seeds (26.0%), leaves (8.2%), pith (6.8%), flowers (2.7%), and animal matter (4.1%), with other foods making up the remaining 1.4%. During the wet season, mandrills forage in continuous forest, when fruit is most available, while during the dry season they feed in gallery forests and at the borders of savannas and forests. The mandrill's preferred fruits include those of the cashew species Pseudospondias microcarpa, the coffee species Nauclea diderrichii and the wort species Psorospermum febrifugum. Mandrills consume more seeds than many other primate species. Adult male mandrills are one of the few primates capable of biting through the hard shell of Detarium microcarpum seeds. For vegetation, they mostly eat the young leaves, shoots and piths of monocot plants. In particular, mandrills consume leaves from the arrowroots Haumania liebrechtsiana and Trachyphrynium braunianum, as well as the piths of ginger plants like Renealmia macrocolia and species in the genus Aframomum. They are also known to consume mushrooms.

The rest of a mandrill's diet is largely made up of invertebrates, particularly ants, termites, crickets, spiders, snails, and scorpions. They also eat birds and their eggs, frogs and rodents. Mandrills have been recorded preying on larger vertebrates such as juvenile bay duikers. Such prey is killed with a bite to the head followed by pulling off the hind limbs and tearing open the belly. Individuals may cooperate during hunting and share kills.

=== Predators, parasites and pathogens ===
Leopards may prey on mandrills, as traces of mandrill have been found in their feces. Other potential predators include African rock pythons, crowned eagles and chimpanzees. Leopards are a threat to all individuals, while eagles are only threats to the young. In a study where a mandrill group was exposed to models of leopards and crown eagles, the leopard models tended to cause the mandrills to flee up trees while the eagles were more likely to drive them to take cover. The dominant male did not flee from either model types; in the case of the leopards, he paced around while looking in their direction. Alarm calls were more commonly heard in response to leopards than eagles.

Mandrills can become infected with gastrointestinal parasites, such as nematodes and protozoa. Tumbu fly larvae may live under the skin and individuals that walk through grassland can get infested with ticks. Blood parasites include the malaria-causing Plasmodium and the nematode Loa loa, which is transmitted by bites from deer flies. Wild mandrills have tested positive for SIV, enteroviruses of the species EV-J and astroviruses, including a human variant.

== Behavior and life history ==
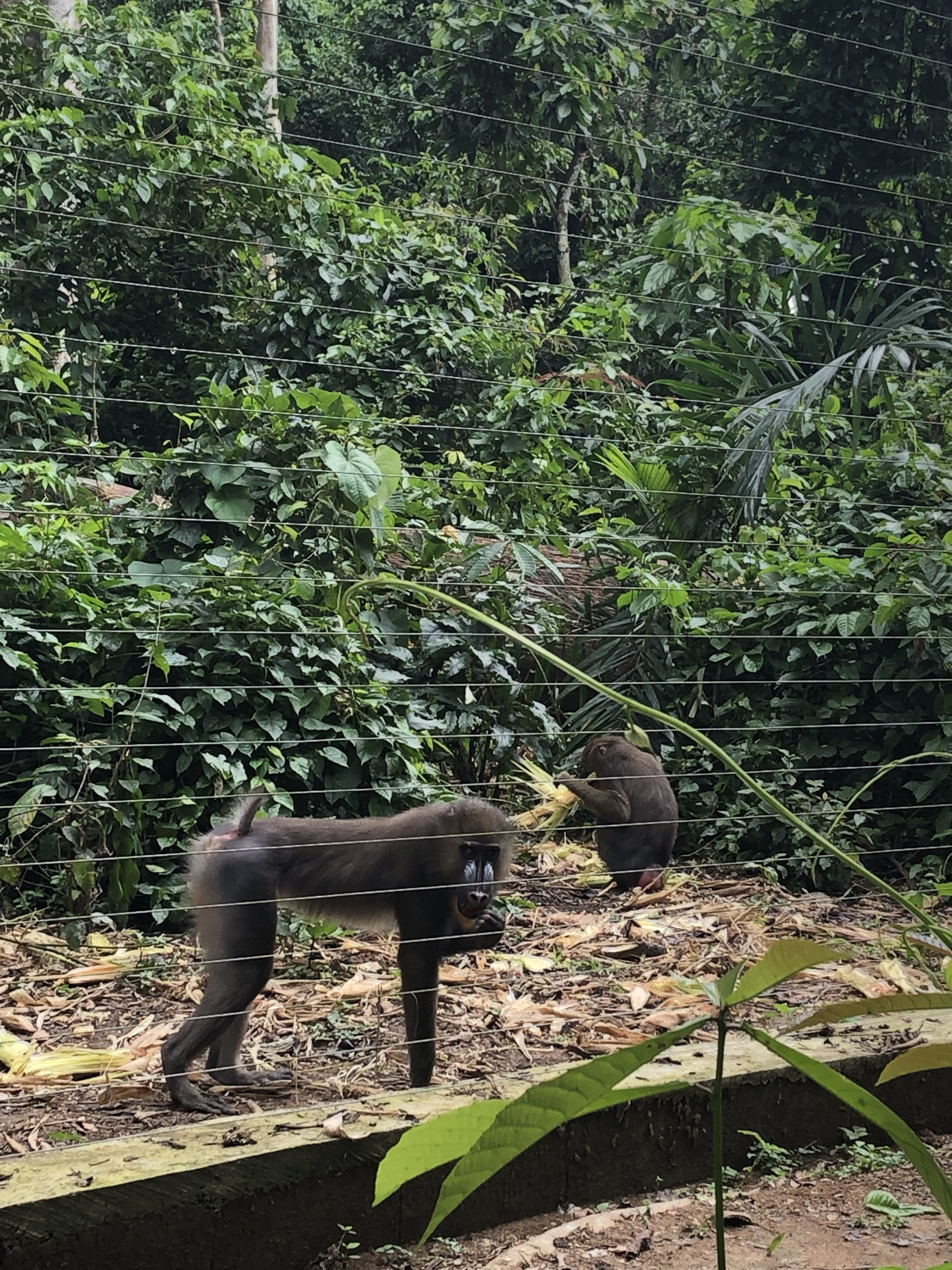
Mandrills behind a wire fence at Mefou National Park

Mandrills are mostly diurnal and are awake around 10 hours per day from morning to dusk. They often pick a new tree to sleep in every night. Mandrills have been observed using tools; in captivity, they use sticks to clean themselves. In the wild, mandrills appear to live 12–14 years, but captive individuals can live 30–40 years.

=== Social structure ===
Mandrills live in large "supergroups" or "hordes" that can contain hundreds of individuals. These large groups are fairly stable and do not appear to be gatherings of smaller ones. At Lopé National Park, Gabon, mandrill hordes were found to have an average of 620 individuals, and some groups were as large as 845, making them possibly the largest cohesive groups of wild primates. Another study in Lopé found that a horde of 625 mandrills consisted of 21 dominant males, 71 less dominant and subadult males, 247 adult and adolescent females, 200 juveniles, and 86 dependent infants. A mandrill horde of around 700 individuals in northern Lopé had a total home range of 182 km^{2} (70 sq mi), 89 km^{2} (34 sq mi) of which was suitable habitat. The supergroup would occasionally diverge into two to four subgroups before reuniting. Another 15-month long study of a 120-member group found a home range of 8.6 km^{2} (3.3 sq mi) with an average traveling distance of 2.42 km (1.50 mi) per day.

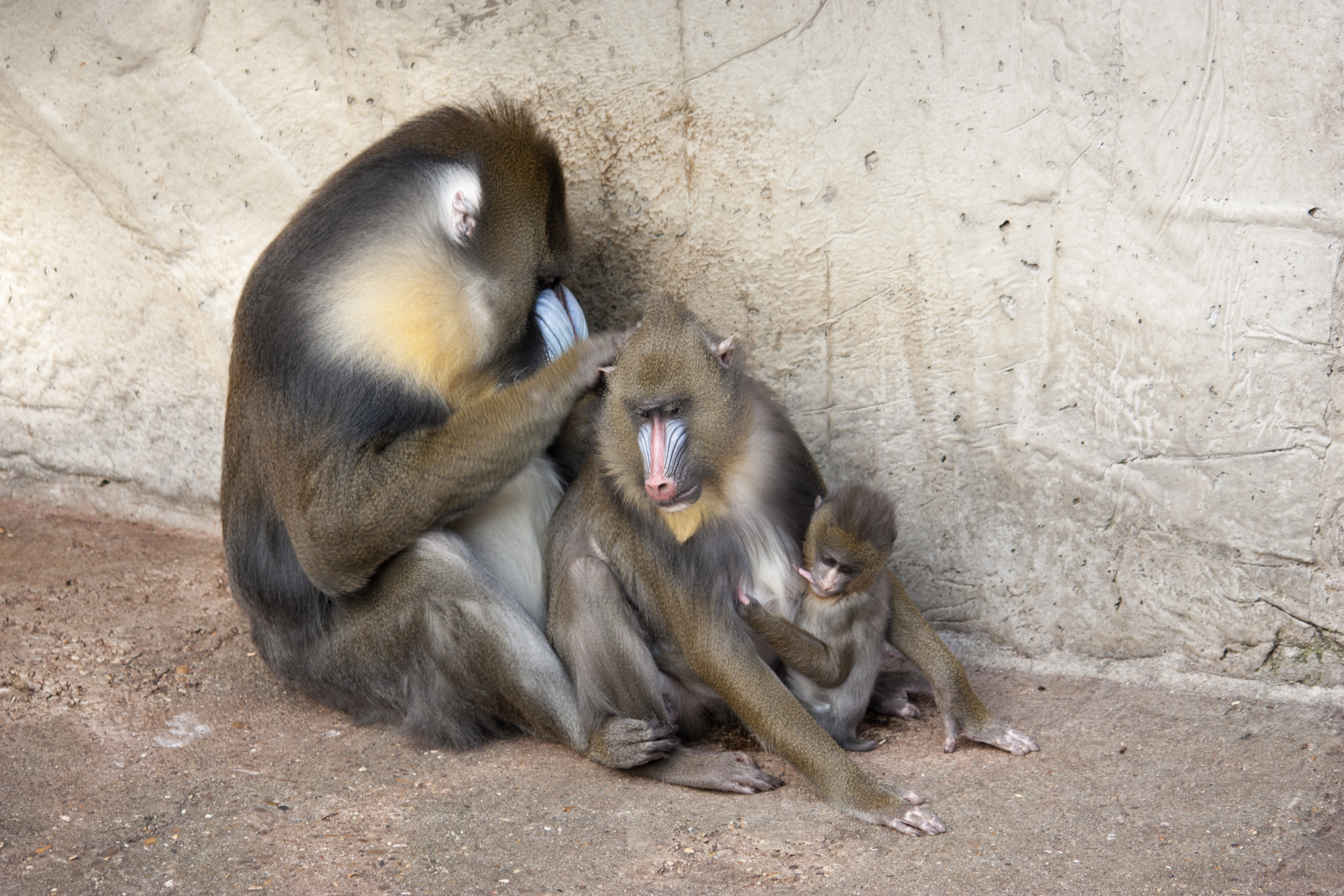
Mandrills grooming at Natura Artis Magistra

Hordes consist of maternally-related family groups, and females are important for maintaining social cohesion. Strong connections with their relatives may lead to support during conflicts, higher survival rate of offspring and a longer lifespan for females. Dominant females are at the center of the group network and their removal leads to fewer social connections in the group. The social rank of a mother mandrill can contribute to the social rank of both her female and male offspring. Mature males are not permanent members of hordes but join as females become sexually receptive and leave as their sexual cycle ends. As a result, the coloration of the male mandrill may be intended to attract attention in a social structure with no long-term relationships between mates. Higher ranking males are found in the center of a social group while lower ranking males are more likely to occupy the periphery. Females have some control over the males and coalitions can expel an unwanted male from a group. Outside the breeding season, males are believed to lead a solitary life and all-male bachelor groups are not known to exist.

Both male and female mandrills rub and mark trees and branches with secretions from their chest glands, though males (and especially dominant males) mark more than females. The chemicals in the secretions signal the individual's sex, age and rank. Scent-marking may also serve a territorial function; captive alpha males will mark enclosure boundaries. Mandrills will groom one another, even when there is no benefit to be gained from doing so. During grooming, subordinates prefer to pick at other mandrills from behind, in order to minimize eye contact and give them more time to flee if the more dominant individual attacks. The recipients of grooming will try to maneuver the groomer to pick at more "risky" areas.

=== Reproduction and development ===
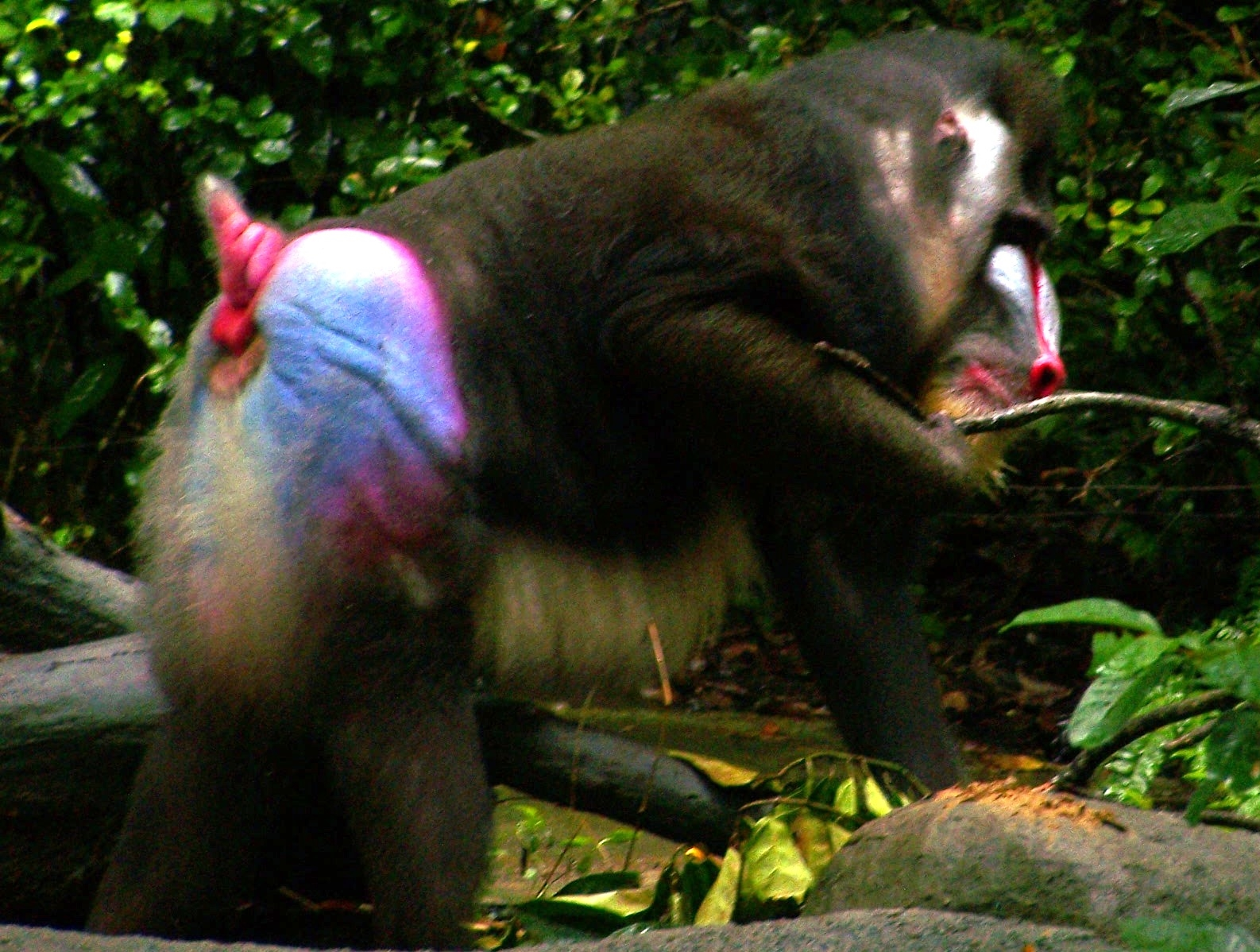
"Fatted" male mandrill showing colorful posterior

Dominant or alpha male mandrills have the most mating success. Upon gaining alpha status, males develop larger testicles, redder faces and posteriors, more secretion from the chest glands and fatter sides and rumps. When a male loses dominance, these physiological changes are at least partially reversed. The blue facial skin is more consistent in brightness. Higher ranking males tend to have more contrast between red and blue facial coloring. Due to their distribution of fat, dominant males are also known as "fatted" males while subordinate males are known as "non-fatted" males. Canine length also correlates with dominance, and males are less likely to sire offspring when their canines are under 30 mm (1.2 in). In some individuals, the development of secondary sexual characteristics is suppressed in response to competition from other males. Male mandrills tend to establish dominance with vocalizations and facial expressions, rather than fighting.

Mating occurs mostly during the dry season, with female ovulation peaking between June and September. Receptive females have sexual swellings on their posteriors, and the red facial coloration can communicate age and fertility. Males also appear to detect a female's reproductive state using the vomeronasal organ (known as the flehmen response). Dominant males try to monopolize access to females by mate guarding, which involves the male tending to and copulating with a female for days. Dominant males tend to sire most of the offspring, but they are less able to monopolize access to the females when many females reach estrus at the same time. A subordinate male is also more likely to have reproductive success if he is closely related to an alpha male. An ovulating female tends to allow the brightest colored males to come near her and touch her perineum, and is more likely to groom and solicit them. The female signals her willingness to mate by positioning her posterior towards the male. Intercourse lasts no more than 60 seconds, with the male mounting the female and making pelvic thrusts.

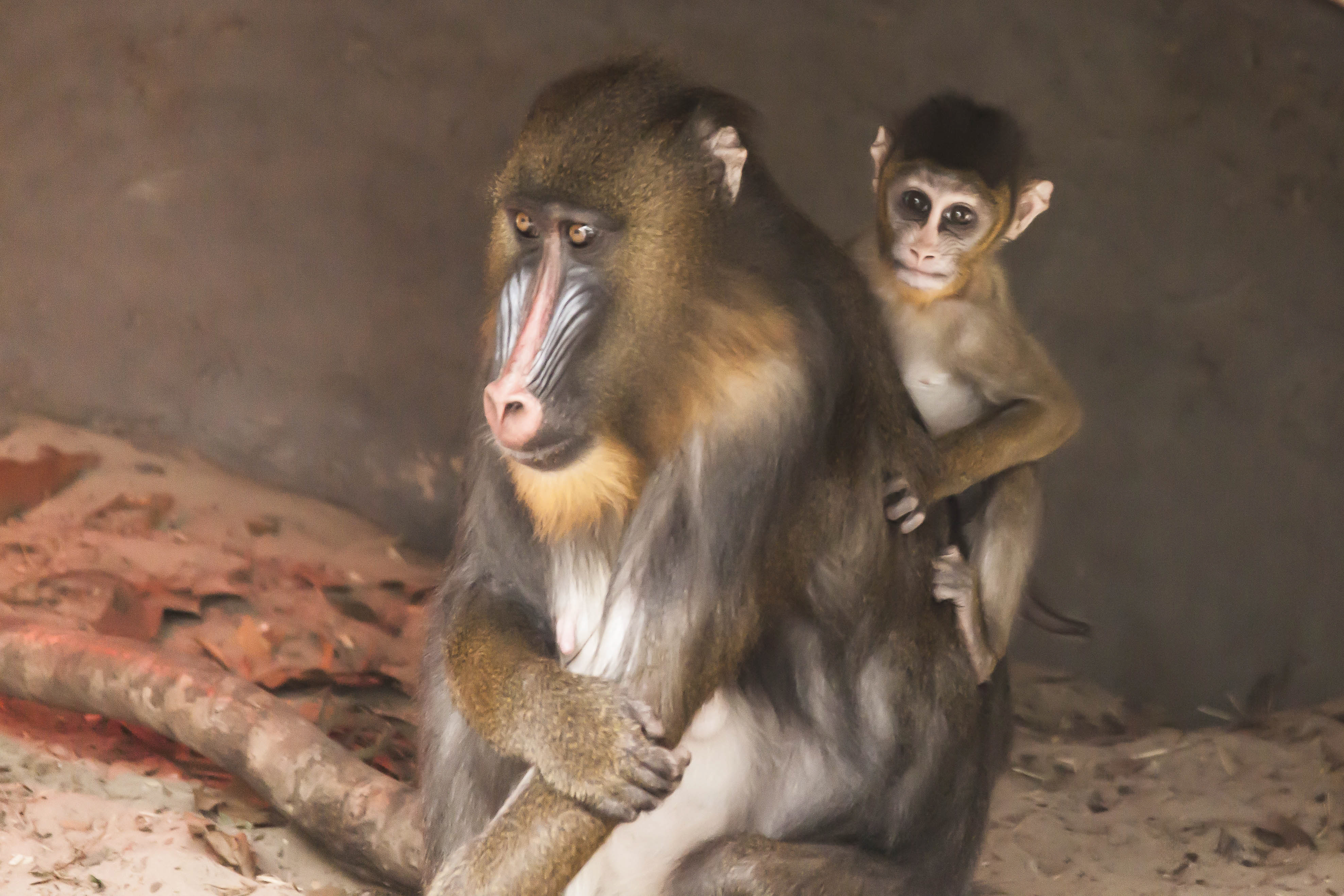
Mandrill infant perched on mother

Mandrill gestation lasts an average of 175 days with most births taking place between January and March, during the wet season. Gaps in between births range from 184 to 1,159 days with an average of 405 days. and tend to be shorter in higher ranking females. Infants are born at an average weight of 640 g (23 oz), and mostly bare-skinned with some white hair and a tuft of dark hair on the head and along the spine. Over the next two or three months, they develop their adult hair color on the body, limbs and head while the flesh-colored face and snout darken. Dependent infants are carried on their mothers' bellies. Young are typically weaned at around 230 days old. Males become more sexually dimorphic between four and eight years old, at which point females are already beginning to give birth. Males start leaving their horde after they reach six years old. Females reach their adult size around seven years while males do so at ten years.

=== Communication ===
Female mandrill facepalming

Mandrills communicate with various facial expressions and postures. Threat displays involve open mouth staring, usually in combination with head bobbing, ground slapping and raised hair. These gestures are usually performed by dominant individuals towards subordinates, who respond with bared teeth grimaces, signaling fear and aggression. Both young and low-ranking females show submission and anxiety with a pouting "duck face". Playful intentions are communicated with a relaxed open-mouth face. Males approaching females display a "grin" or silent bared-teeth face and make lip-smacks. This display may also occur with teeth-chattering. Mandrills can develop and pass on new gestures; captive individuals at the Colchester Zoo, England facepalm to discourage being disturbed, particularly while resting.

Mandrills also produce several vocalizations, for both long and short distances. During group movements, adult males produce two-phase grunts and one-syllable roars, both of which are equivalent to the "wahoo" bark of baboons. Other group members produce "crowings", which last almost two seconds and start as a vibration and transition into a longer harmonic sound. Short distance vocals include the "yak", a sharp, repeating, pulse-like call produced by all individuals except for adult males and made in tense situations. Mandrills may also grunt during aggressive encounters. Growls are used to express mild alarm while intense alarms come in the form of a short, two-syllable sharp call known as the "k-alarm". A sharp, loud "K-sound" is produced for unknown reasons. Screaming is a signal of fear and made by individuals fleeing, while the girney, a type of moan or purr, is made as a form of appeasement or frustration among females and young. Individual voices are more similar among related animals, but unrelated mandrills can have similar voices if they regularly interact.

== Threats and conservation ==
As of 2019, the IUCN Red List lists the mandrill as vulnerable. Its total population is unknown but is suspected to have decreased by more than 30 percent over the last 24 years. Its main threats are habitat destruction and hunting for bushmeat. The mandrill appears to have suffered massive habitat loss in Equatorial Guinea and southern Cameroon, while its range in the Republic of the Congo is limited and its status is unknown. In addition, while mandrills live in groups numbering in the hundreds, hunting in Cameroon and Equatorial Guinea appears to have led to smaller group sizes. Gabon is seen as the most important remaining refuge for the species, and the country's low population density and vast rainforests make it a good candidate for mandrill conservation. Surveys have shown high population numbers for other primate species like chimpanzees and gorillas. A semi-wild population exists at the International Centre of Medical Research of Franceville.

The mandrill is listed under Appendix I by CITES, banning commercial trade in wild-caught specimens, and under Class B by the African Convention, which provides them protection but allows special authorization for their killing, capturing or collecting. There is at least one protected area for mandrills within each of the countries they inhabit. In Gabon, most of the rainforests have been leased to timber companies but around 10 percent is part of a national parks system, 13 of which were established in 2002.
