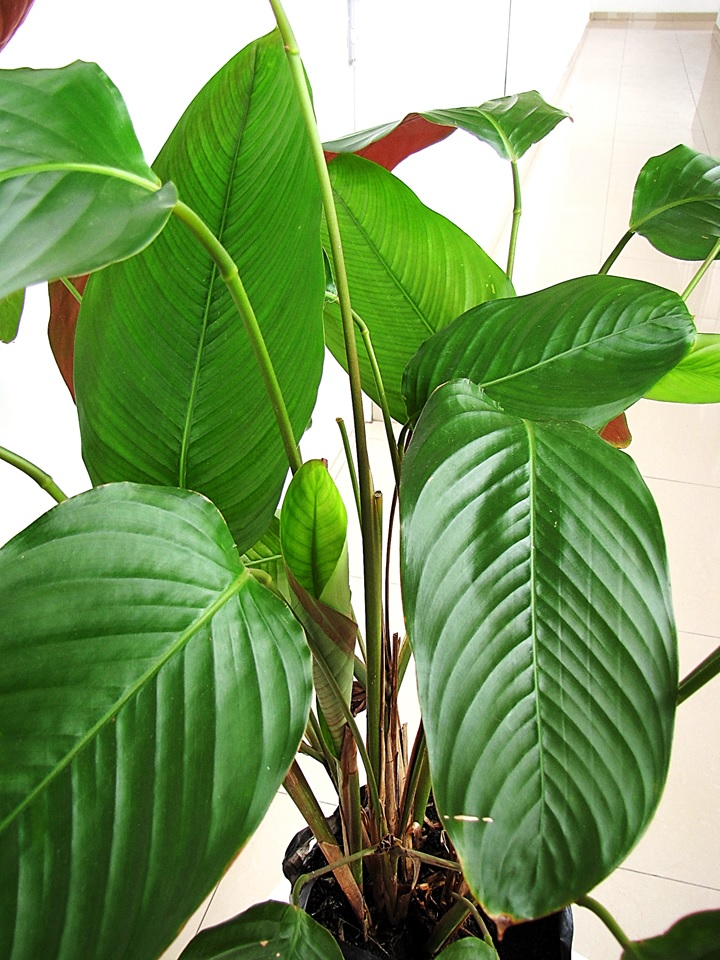
- Haumania liebrechtsiana

Scientific classification
- Kingdom: Plantae
- Clade: Tracheophytes
- Clade: Angiosperms
- Clade: Monocots
- Clade: Commelinids
- Order: Zingiberales
- Family: Marantaceae
- Genus: Haumania; J.Léonard

= Haumania =

Genus of flowering plants

Haumania is a genus of flowering plants in the family Marantaceae. It is native to central Africa. As of March 2022, Kew and Plants of the World Online accepts three species:

- Haumania danckelmaniana (J.Braun & K.Schum.) Milne-Redh., Kew Bull. 5: 162 (1950). - Africa (Central African Republic, Cameroon, Equatorial Guinea, Gabon, Congo-Brazzaville, Congo-Kinshasa)
- Haumania leonardiana C.M.Evrard & Bamps, Bull. Jard. Bot. État Bruxelles 29: 370 (1959). - Congo-Kinshasa
- Haumania liebrechtsiana (De Wild. & T.Durand) J.Léonard, Bull. Jard. Bot. État Bruxelles 19: 454 (1949). - Africa (Cabinda, Gabon, Congo-Brazzaville, Congo-Kinshasa)

Kew does not accept Haumania microphylla Hoogland, Blumea, Suppl. 4: 228 (1958). - New Guinea and Haumania walkeri Ohwi, J. Jap. Bot. 33: 212 (1958). - Japan as valid species.
