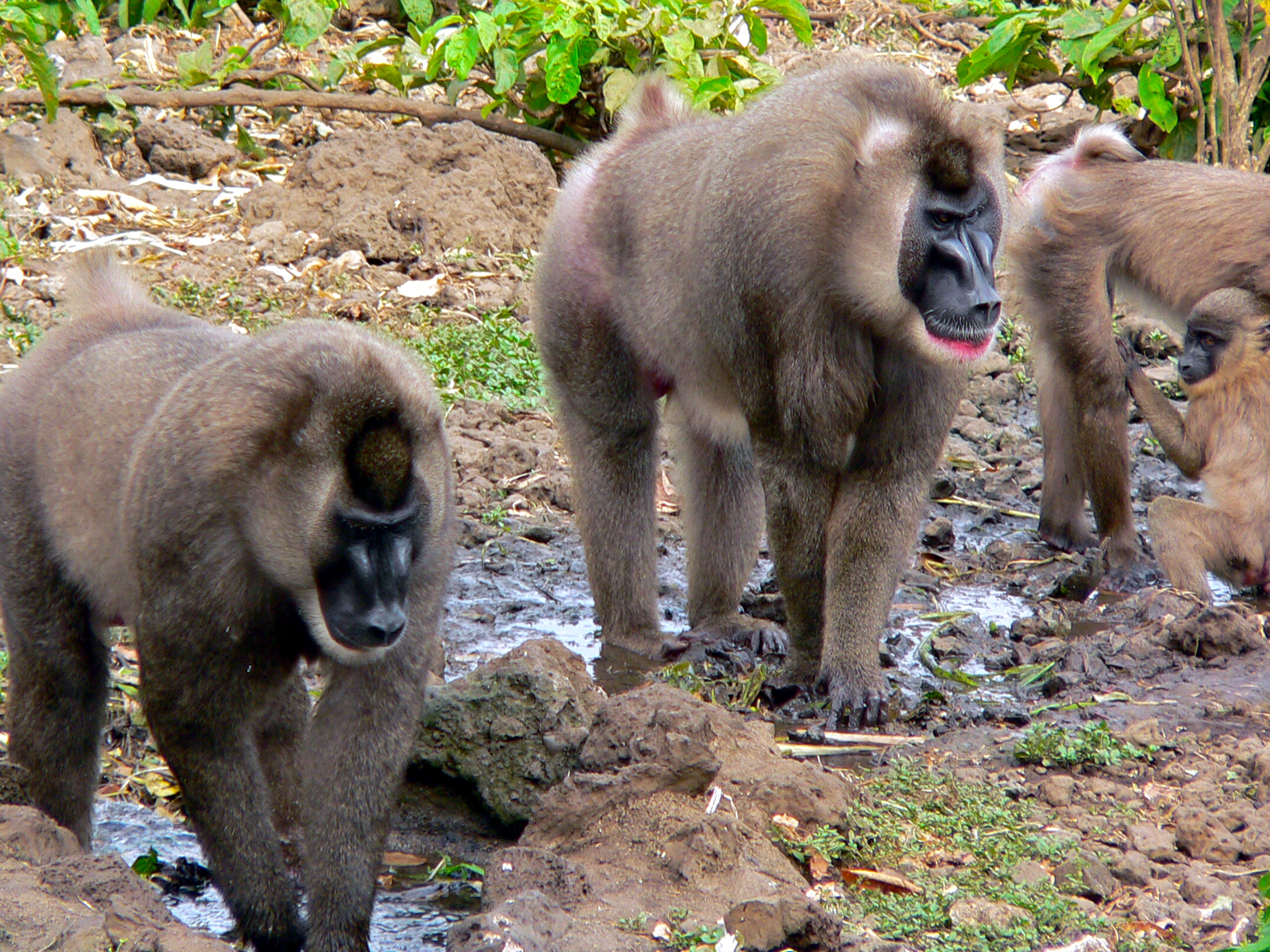
- Mainland drills, from Cameroon

Conservation status
- Endangered (IUCN 3.1)

Scientific classification
- Kingdom: Animalia
- Phylum: Chordata
- Class: Mammalia
- Order: Primates
- Suborder: Haplorhini
- Family: Cercopithecidae
- Genus: Mandrillus
- Species: M. leucophaeus
- Subspecies: M. l. leucophaeus

Trinomial name
- Mandrillus leucophaeus leucophaeus (F. Cuvier, 1807)

= Mainland drill =

Subspecies of Old World monkey

The mainland drill (Mandrillus leucophaeus leucophaeus) is a subspecies of the endangered drill. It is distinguished by ringed yellow and black coloring on its crown, and is otherwise similar to the Bioko drill.
