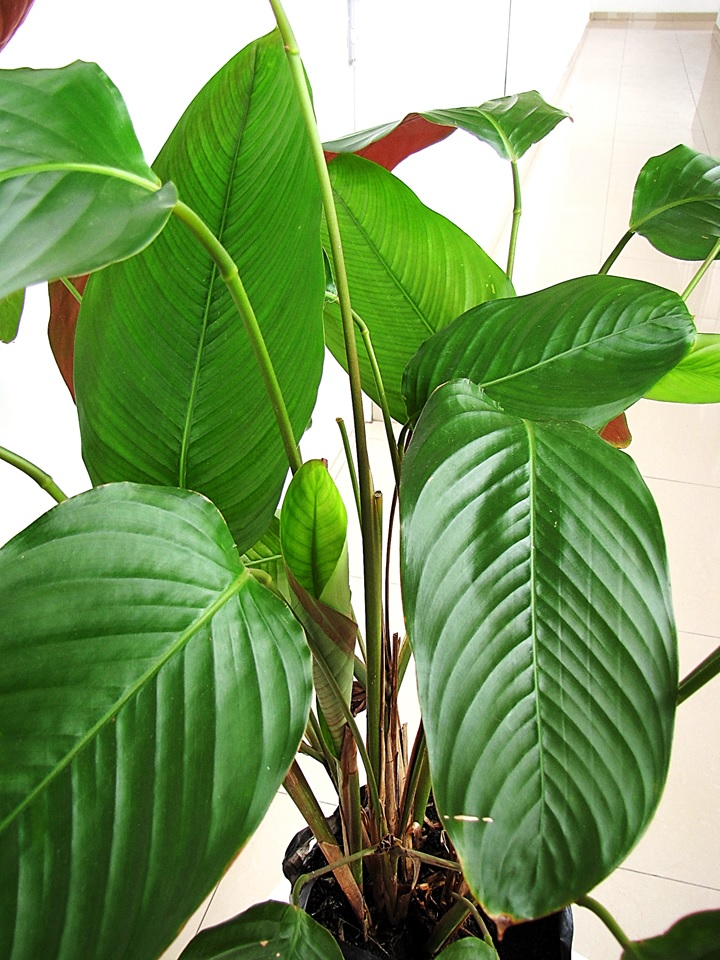

Scientific classification
- Kingdom: Plantae
- Clade: Tracheophytes
- Clade: Angiosperms
- Clade: Monocots
- Clade: Commelinids
- Order: Zingiberales
- Family: Marantaceae
- Genus: Haumania
- Species: H. liebrechtsiana

Binomial name
- Haumania liebrechtsiana (De Wild. & T.Durand) J.Léonard

Synonyms
- Maranta liebrechtsiana L.Linden; Trachyphrynium liebrechtsianum De Wild. & T.Durand

= Haumania liebrechtsiana =

Species of flowering plant

Haumania liebrechtsiana is a species of plant in the family Marantaceae. It grows as an understorey herb or climber in tropical forests in Central Africa. The leaves and shoots are eaten by gorillas and chimpanzees, and the leaves and stems have traditional uses.

== Description ==
Haumania liebrechtsiana is a perennial, rhizomatous, climbing plant that can grow to 10 m (33 ft) or more. The stems are hairy and branching, and the leaves are alternate. The long petiole sheaths the stem for most of its length and has a short calloused section just beneath the leaf blade. On the upper side of the blade there is a beak where this calloused region becomes the midvein. The blade is ovate or oblong, up to 30 by 15 cm (12 by 6 in), with a rounded base and pointed tip. The inflorescence is a raceme up to 10 cm (4 in) long, with a zigzag stem, bearing white, fragrant, bisexual flowers, with parts in threes. The fruit is a round, yellowish capsule containing black seeds.

== Distribution and habitat ==
Haumania liebrechtsiana is endemic to tropical western Central Africa. Its range includes Gabon, the Democratic Republic of the Congo and the Republic of the Congo. It is a rainforest plant, a climbing species that sometimes dominates the understorey. It occurs in moist habitats, near streams and in flooded areas.

== Ecology ==
In the Congo Basin, this plant is often found in degraded secondary growth forest where it dominates the understorey; Zenker's fruit bat (Scotonycteris zenkeri) is often found in its vicinity. Gorillas also favour this plant, selecting the leaves and shoots but rejecting the other parts of the plant, and chimpanzees and the Dryas monkey also selectively feed on the foliage.

== Uses ==
This plant has many uses. The leaves are used for wrapping food and other objects. Fibres from the stems are used in weaving and as cord, and in the manufacture of animal traps. The split petioles serve as skewers and the split stems as arrow cases. The ash is used in herbal medicine for external application.
