= Friedrich J. Grabowsky =

Prussian zoologist (1857–1929)

Friedrich Johann Grabowski
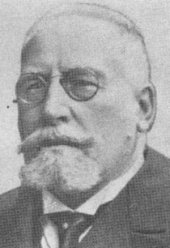
- Born: January 27, 1857; Olecko, Province of Prussia
- Died: January 20, 1929 (aged 71); Wrocław, Weimar Republic
- Known for: Director of the Wrocław Zoo
- Scientific career
- Fields: Biology, Speleology
- Institutions: Wrocław Zoological Garden

Friedrich Johann Grabowski, also spelled as Fryderyk Grabowski and Grabowsky, (27 January 1857 – 20 January 1929) was a German biologist and speleologist, director of the Wrocław Zoo between 18 March 1901 and 20 January 1929 (with an interruption from 1921 to 1927).

He undertook two major naturalist expeditions: in 1880 to India, Ceylon and Borneo, and in 1886–1887 to New Guinea. In addition to collecting specimens, he also carried out ethnological observations. From 1891 he worked at the Natural History Museum in Braunschweig. In 1901 he became director of the Wrocław Zoo. After its closure in 1921 for financial reasons, Grabowski worked for its reopening in 1927, when he once again became director. His main research field was botany, but he also conducted zoological studies, including ornithological work. In 1901 he became a member of the German National Academy of Sciences Leopoldina.

== Taxa named after Grabowski ==
- Solanaceae: Grabowskia ameghinoi Speg. – Nov. Add. Fl. Patag. ii. (1902), repr. 48.
- Solanaceae: Grabowskia boerhaaviaefolia Kuntze – Revis. Gen. Pl. 3, pt. 2: 221. 1898
- Solanaceae: Grabowskia geniculata C.L.Hitchc. – Ann. Missouri Bot. Gard. 19: 331. 1932
- Solanaceae: Grabowskia glauca I.M.Johnst. – Contr. Gray Herb. 85: 112. 1929
- Solanaceae: Grabowskia megalosperma Speg. – Nov. Add. Fl. Patag. ii. (1902), repr. 46.
- Solanaceae: Grabowskia schizocalyx Dammer – Meded. Rijks-Herb. 29: 22. 1916
- Solanaceae: Grabowskia sodiroi Bitter – Abh. Naturwiss. Vereine Bremen 23: 120. 1914
- Solanaceae: Grabowskia spegazzinii Dusén – Ark. Bot. 7, no. 2: 33, pl. 4, 8. 1907
- Araceae: Cryptocoryne grabowskii Engl. – in Engl. Jahrb. xxv. 28.
- Araceae: Homalomena grabowskii Engl. – in Engl. Pflanzenreich, Arac. Homalomen.-Schismatoglott. 45 (1912).
- Araceae: Piptospatha grabowskii Engl. – in Engl. Pflanzenreich, Arac. Homalomen.-Schismatoglott. 125 (1912).
- Araceae: Rhynchopyle grabowskii Engl. – in Engl. Jahrb. xxv. 20.
- Araceae: Schismatoglottis grabowskii Engl. – in Engl. Pflanzenreich, Arac. Homalomen.-Schismatoglott. 121 (1912).
- Calamaria grabowskyi.

== Bibliography ==
- Mirosław Syniawa, Biograficzny słownik przyrodników śląskich, vol. 1, Centrum Dziedzictwa Przyrody Górnego Śląska, Katowice 2006, pp. 119–120 (with photograph)
