= Africarium =

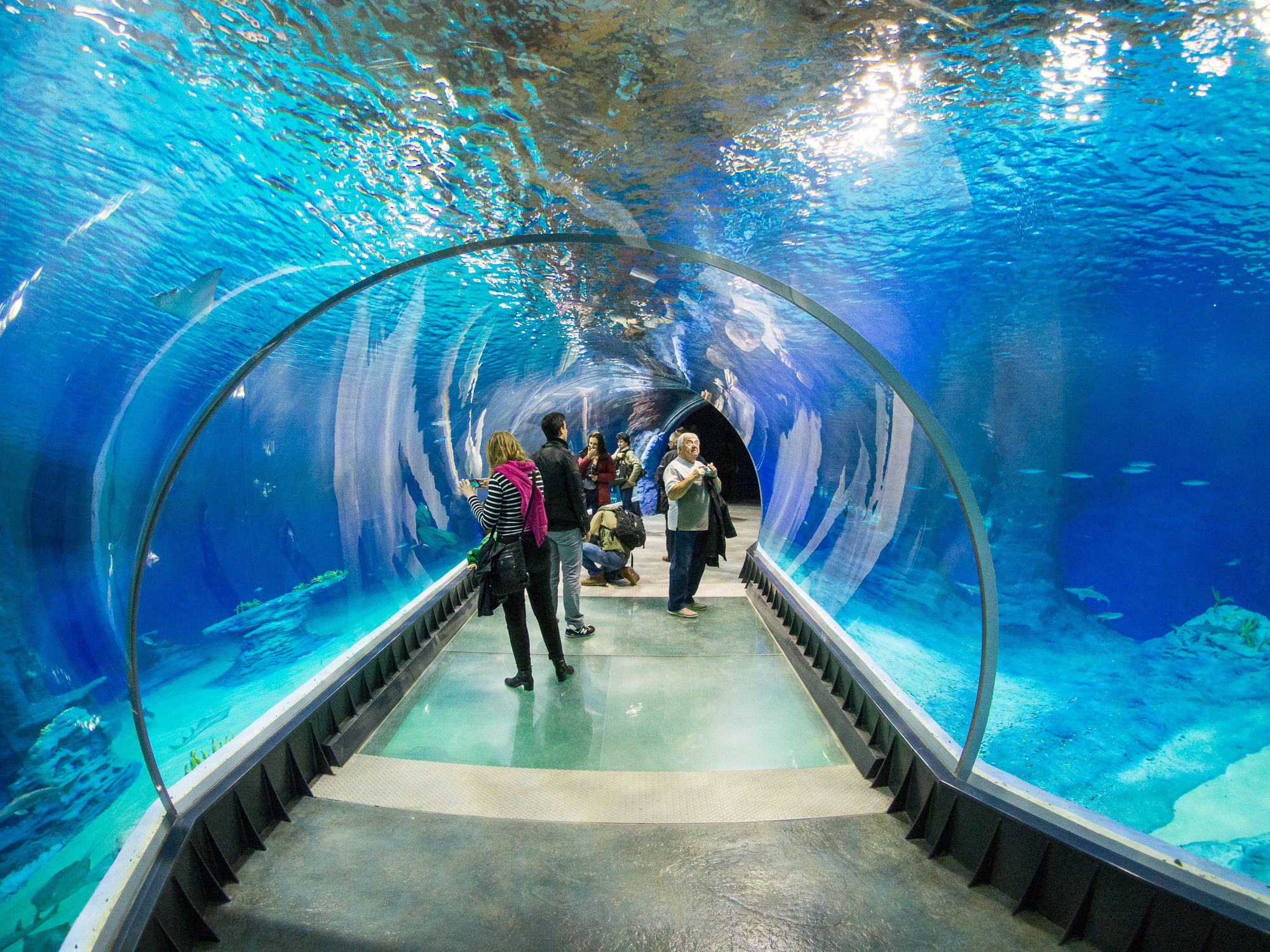
- The largest tank of the Afrykarium shows the depths of the Mozambique Channel, where sharks, rays, and other large pelagic fish can be viewed from this 18 meter long underwater acrylic tunnel.
- Interactive map of Africarium
- 51.1048°N 17.0745°E
- Date opened: 2014
- Location: Wrocław, Poland
- Website: zoo.wroclaw.pl/en/africarium.html

The Africarium (Polish: Afrykarium) is a oceanarium in Wrocław, Poland, devoted to exhibiting the fauna of Africa. It is part of the Wrocław Zoo. The idea behind the Africarium is to comprehensively present selected ecosystems from the continent of Africa. The Africarium houses multiple species of fish, hippos, African fur seals, manatees and many others. The zoo houses over 10 thousand animals, its breadth extends from housing insects such cockroaches to the large mammals like the elephants on an area of over 33 hectares.
