= Calamaria grabowskyi =

Conservation status
- Least Concern (IUCN 3.1)

Scientific classification
- Kingdom: Animalia
- Phylum: Chordata
- Order: Squamata
- Suborder: Serpentes
- Family: Colubridae
- Genus: Calamaria
- Species: C. grabowskyi

Binomial name
- Calamaria grabowskyi Fischer, 1885
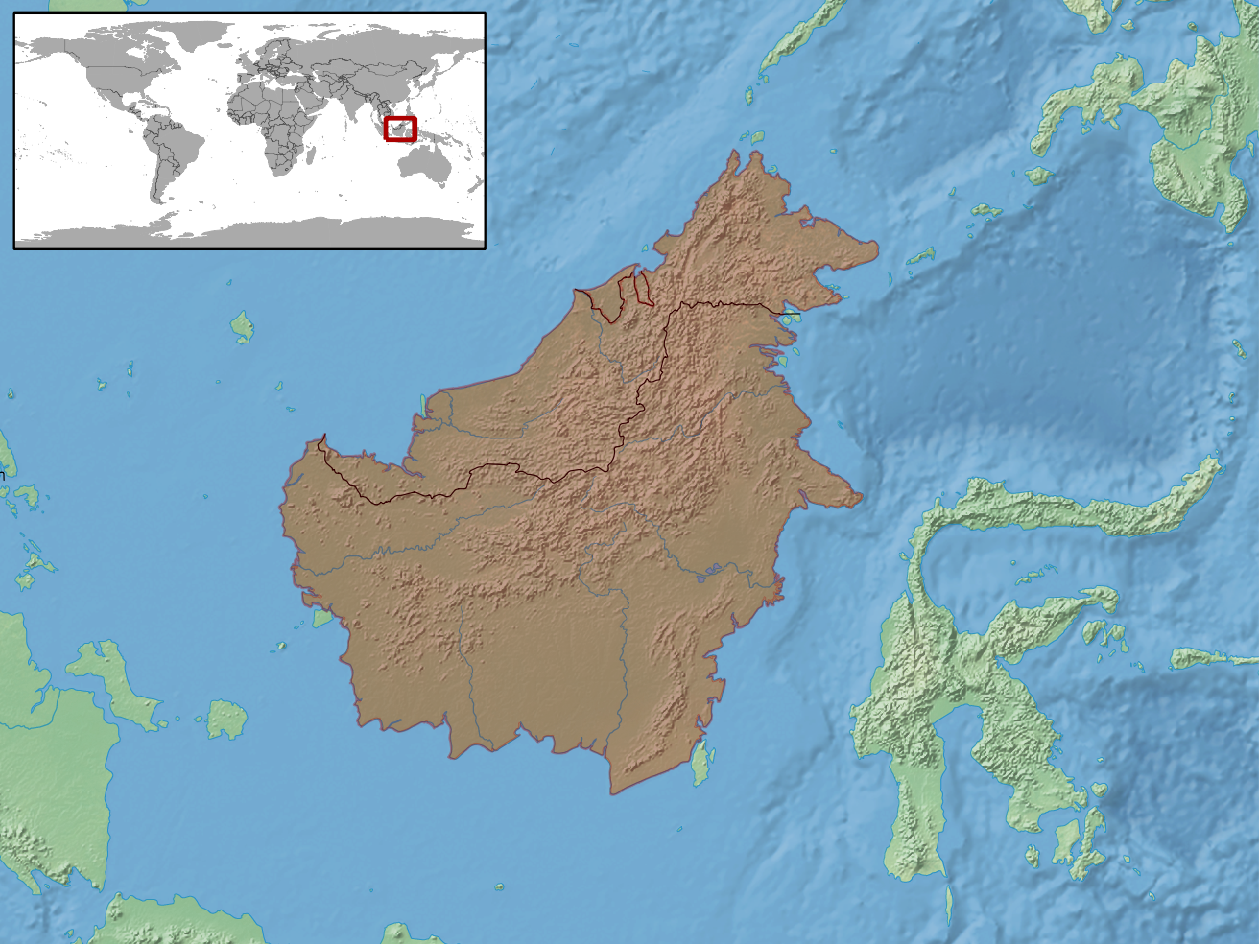

Species of snake

Calamaria grabowskyi, also known commonly as Grabowsky's dwarf snake and Grabowsky's reed snake, is a species of snake in the subfamily Calamariinae of the family Colubridae. The species is endemic to the island of Borneo in Maritime Southeast Asia.

== Etymology ==
The specific name, grabowskyi, is in honor of biologist Friedrich J. Grabowsky, who worked in Borneo and New Guinea in the 1880s.

== Geographic distribution ==
On the island of Borneo, Calamaria grabowskyi is found in the countries of Brunei, Indonesia, and Malaysia.

== Habitat ==
The preferred natural habitat of Calamaria grabowskyi is forest, at elevations below 1,500 m (4,900 ft).

== Description ==
Females of Calamaria grabowskyi may attain a total length (tail included) of about 47 cm (19 in). Males are smaller and may attain a total length of about 37 cm (15 in).

== Behavior ==
Calamaria grabowskyi is a terrestrial species which lives in the leaf litter of the forest.

== Reproduction ==
Calamaria grabowskyi is oviparous.
