= Wrocław Zoo =

Wrocław Zoological Garden Ogród Zoologiczny we Wrocławiu
- Logo of the Wrocław Zoo

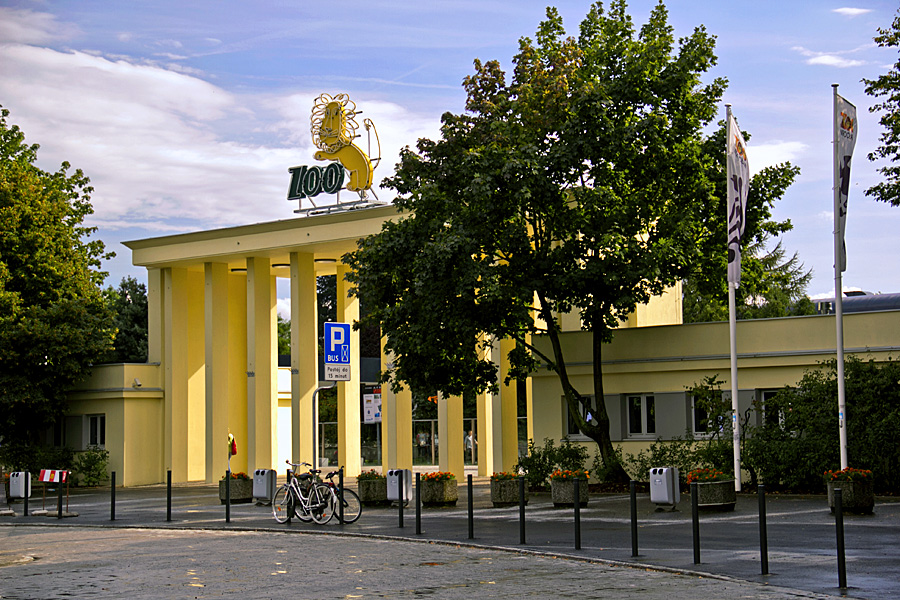
- The main entrance
- Interactive map of Wrocław Zoological Garden; Ogród Zoologiczny we Wrocławiu
- 51°06′16″N 17°04′27″E
- Date opened: 1865, 1927, 1948
- Location: Wrocław, Poland
- Land area: 33 hectares (82 acres)
- No. of animals: ~10,500
- No. of species: 1,132 (2016)
- Annual visitors: 2,000,000
- Memberships: EAZA, WAZA
- Major exhibits: 12,000
- Director: Tomasz Jóźwik
- Website: zoo.wroclaw.pl

The Wrocław Zoological Garden (Polish: Ogród Zoologiczny we Wrocławiu; Silesian: Wrocławski Ôgrōd Zoologiczny), known simply as the Wrocław Zoo (Polish: Zoo Wrocław; Silesian: Zoo we Wrocławie), is a zoo on Wróblewski Street in Wrocław, Poland. It is the oldest zoo in Poland, having been first launched in 1865 as the Breslau Zoological Garden while the city was part of Prussia. During the World Wars it was first shut down, then reopened and finally destroyed. After World War II, it was rebuilt and ultimately opened in 1948 and now it is also the largest (in terms of the number of animals/species) zoo in the country. The zoo covers 33 hectares (82 acres) near downtown Wrocław. It is home to about 10,500 animals representing about 1,132 species. In terms of the number of animal species it is the third largest zoological garden in the world.

The Wrocław Zoo is the most visited zoo in Poland and the fifth most visited zoo in Europe.

The zoo is an accredited member of the European Association of Zoos and Aquaria (EAZA) and the World Association of Zoos and Aquariums (WAZA).

== History ==
The beginnings of the zoo date back to 1863 when the decision to establish a zoological garden in Breslau was made at the initiative of a local community. The city authorities designated 9 hectares of land by the Oder River for the purposes of building the zoo, and on 10 July 1865, the grand opening ceremony of the new complex took place, accompanied by a fireworks display, and a military orchestra. The zoo was in possession of 452 animals representing 50 species. The first visitors could see such animals as wolves, monkeys, bears and big cats. In the first year of its existence, the zoo was visited by approximately 67,000 people.

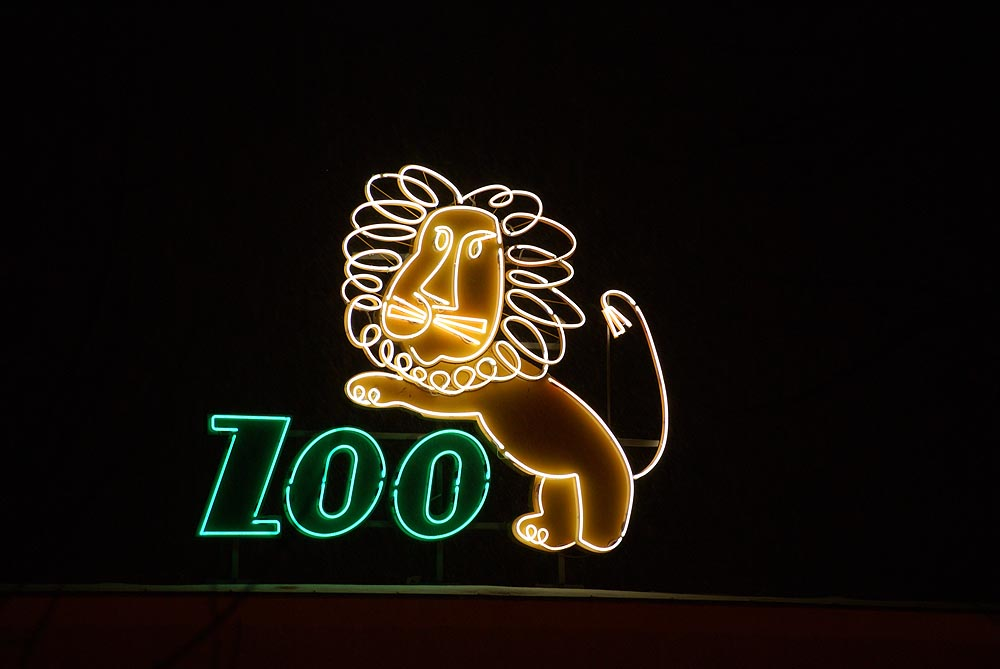
Neon logo of the Zoo

The zoo enjoyed considerable popularity among the inhabitants of Breslau despite a relatively limited variety of animals to be seen. The first elephant was bought in as late as 1873. It was an African elephant named Theodor and was transported from the London Zoo. It instantly became one of the biggest attractions of the zoo in Breslau. In later years, the garden also acquired such animals as an anteater, eared seals, and penguins. Among other favourite animals of the zoo were chimpanzee Moritz and gorilla Pussy which arrived in the city in 1897 from Liverpool. A commemorative statue devoted to her can still be found to this day in the Wrocław Zoo.

One of the biggest breeding successes of the zoo was the birth of the first in the world Malayan tapir, and in the Interwar period a hippopotamus named Anton. The zoo could also boast Muschi, the only Amazonian manatee in Europe, which died in the winter of 1945 (it lived for nine years).

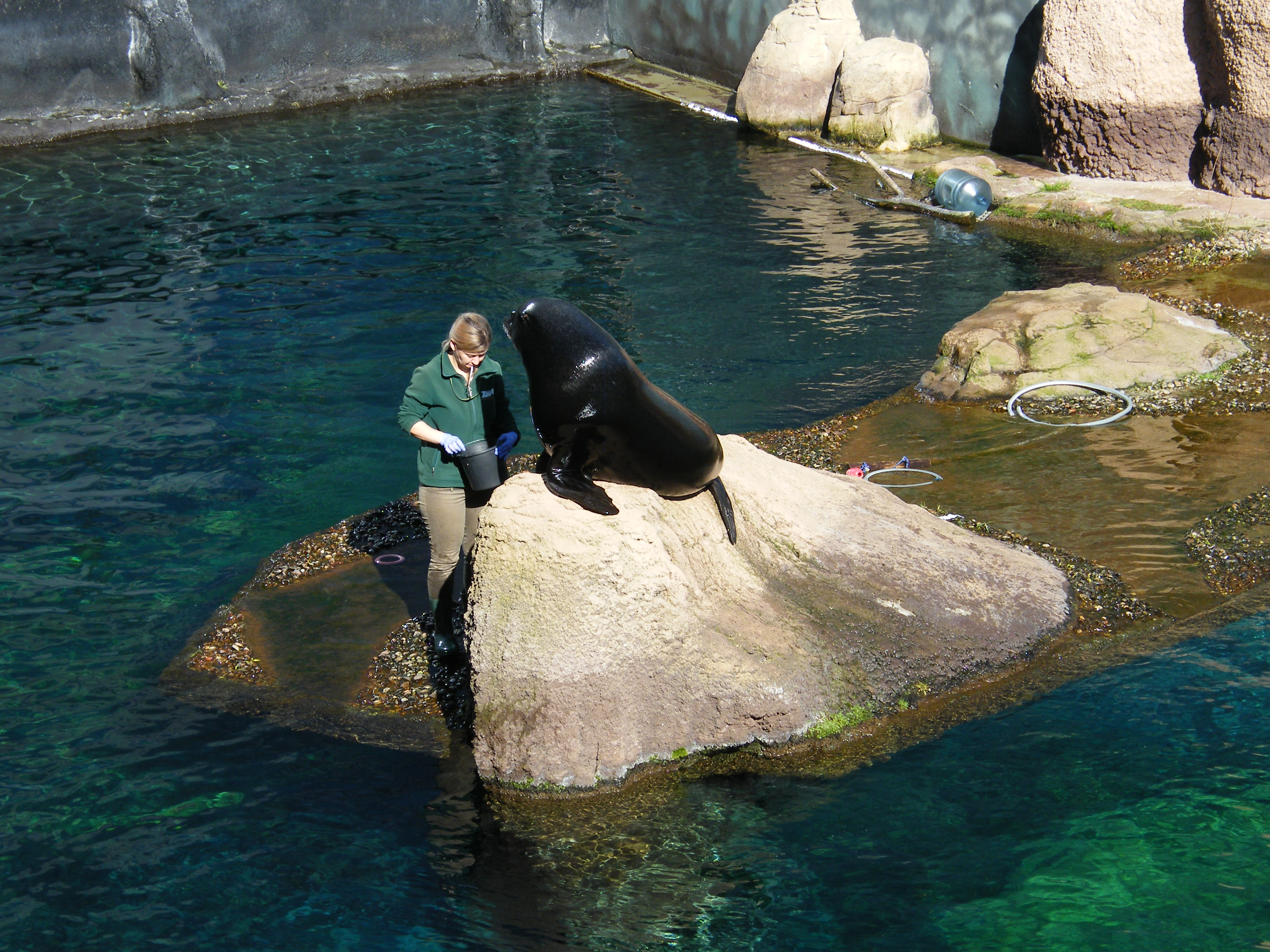
The feeding of a brown fur seal at the Wrocław zoo

After the First World War, the zoo was forced to close due to an economic crisis, and the animals had to be transferred to other zoological gardens in Germany, mostly to Berlin, Leipzig and Cologne. The area of the former zoo was turned into a large park. In 1927, the zoological garden reopened and operated up until 1945. During the siege of Festung Breslau, most of the animals were killed and the remaining ones were sent to other zoos located in a number of Polish cities including Poznań, Kraków and Łódź.

After the Second World War, the plans to rebuild the zoo were drawn and one of the main initiators of this project was zoologist Stanisław Kulczyński from the Wrocław University of Technology. In 1947, Karol Łukaszewicz, who previously worked at the Kraków Zoo, was appointed the first Polish director of the zoo that was soon to be reopened. He played a key role in rebuilding the ruined zoo, bringing back the animals that were taken away from the zoo as well as acquiring new ones. On 18 July 1948, the Wrocław zoo was ceremonially opened. At that time, it possessed 224 animals representing 72 species, including wolves, bears, wild boars, baboons, a camel, bisons, parrots and a South American tapir. By the end of 1948, the zoo was visited by 365,000 people. In the following years, it was expanded by 15 hectares, which allowed to increase the number of animals that the zoo could exhibit.

In 1997, the nearby Oder River overflowed, causing the zoo to be nearly damaged by a flood.

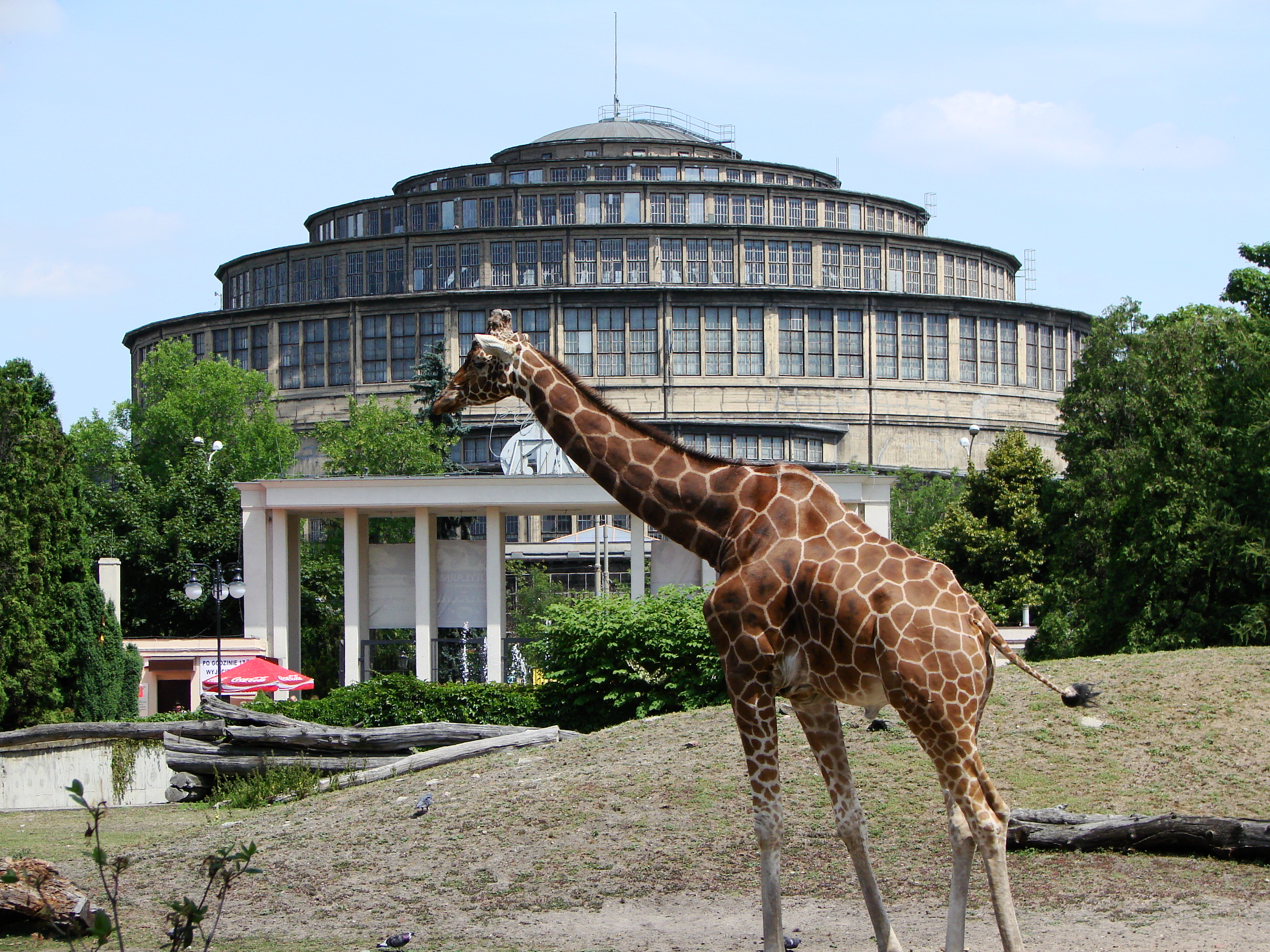
A giraffe at the Wrocław Zoo and the Centennial Hall in the background

In the second half of the 20th century, the Wrocław zoo achieved great success thanks to a popular TV show With A Camera Among Animals (Polish: "Z kamerą wśród zwierząt") hosted by Hanna and Antoni Gucwiński, who in 1966 became the director of the zoo. The programme ran for more than three decades on TVP Channel (ending in 2001) and contributed to turning the Wrocław Zoo into the most popular zoo in Poland.

In 2006, Radosław Ratajszczak, previously working at the Poznań Zoo, became the new director of the zoo and initiated an extensive programme of investments. New pavilions and enclosures were built, including the ones for rhinoceroses, and lynxes. The Seal Centre was constructed as well as the Odrarium building. However, the biggest and most successful investment was the building of Africarium, an oceanarium specially designed to feature the fauna of Africa which opened in 2014. The building is home to such species as rays, sandbar sharks, Nile crocodiles, hippopotamuses, manatees, speckled mousebirds, hadada ibises, hamerkops, and African grey hornbills. It attracted even more visitors and made it the most frequently visited zoo in Poland with an annual number of visitors amounting to around 2 million.

== Attractions and activities ==
The zoo includes among others: the Africarium (the only oceanarium of its kind which focuses exclusively on the fauna of Africa), the Madagascar Pavilion, the Odrarium, Terrarium, Zoolandia ropes course, Children's Zoo, the Ranch, as well as food and drinks outlets.

Moreover, it houses a collection of a number of rare and exotic species such as manatee, okapi, bear cuscus, red hartebeest, Philippine mouse-deer, L'Hoest's monkey, and long-necked turtle. The zoo also actively participates in a number of initiatives and support programmes aimed at rescuing endangered species, sends zoo workers on rescue missions, runs open meetings such as ZOO na ratunek ("Zoo to the Rescue") and offers a variety of educational activities for children and teens.

The zoo's breeding program has also had a number of major successes, which include the births of Pygmy hippopotamus in 2010 and 2012, Philippine scops owl (the only one in the world outside of the Philippines), reticulated giraffe in 2012 as well as the first in the world Sulawesi bear cuscus in 2018.

== List of directors ==
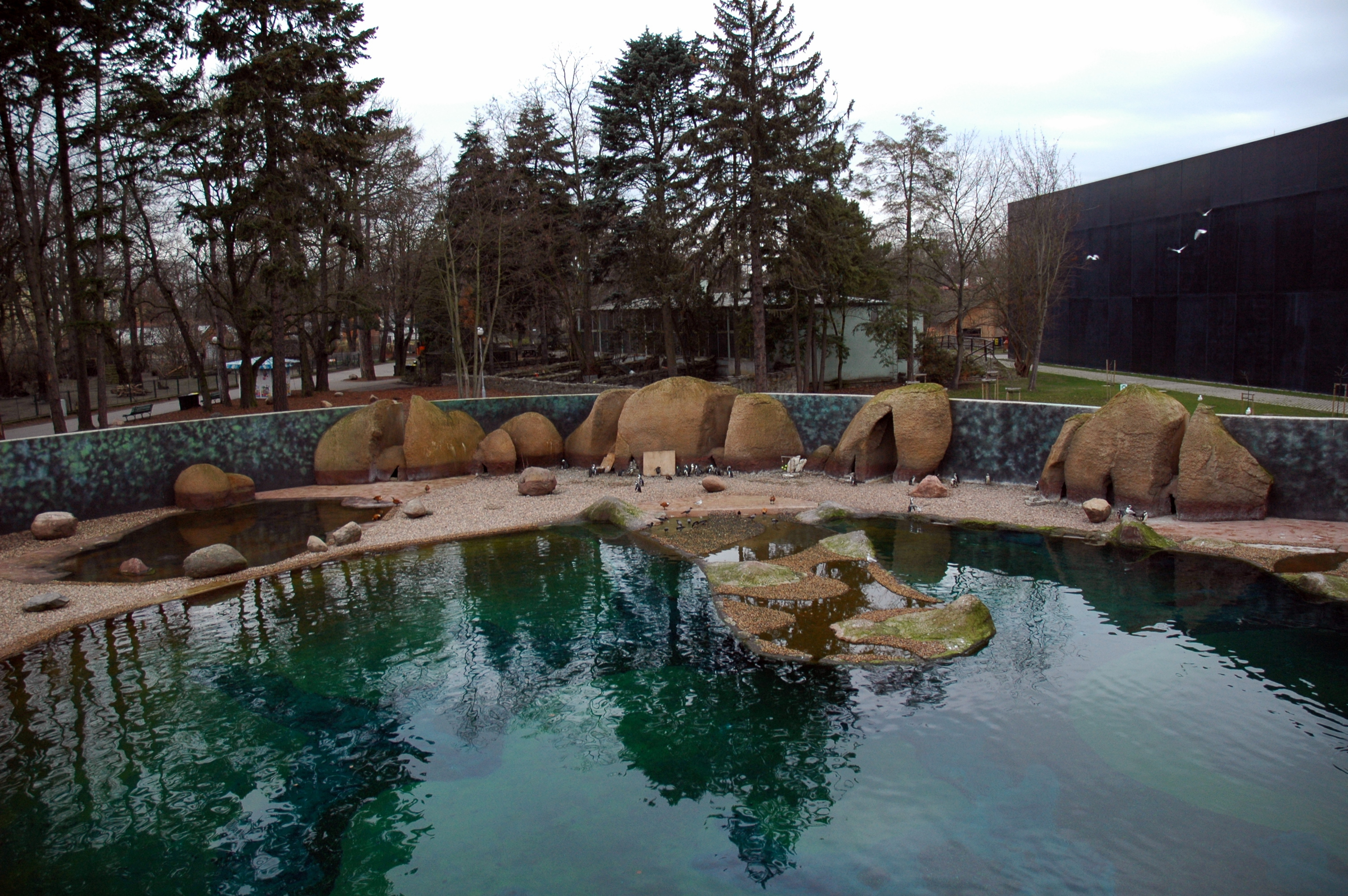
The Seal Centre at the Wrocław Zoo

- Franz Schlegel (1864-1882)
- Hermann Stechmann (1882-1900)
- Friedrich Grabowsky (1900-1929)
- Hans Honigmann (1929-1934)
- Martin Schlott (1934-1946)
- Karol Łukaszewicz (1947-1966)
- Antoni Gucwiński (1966-2006)
- Radosław Ratajszczak (2007-28th February 2022)
- Joanna Kasprzak and Mirosław Piasecki (March 2022-21st April 2024)
- Joanna Kasprzak (21st April-26th July 2024)
- Sergiusz Kmiecik (26th July-23rd October 2024)
- Tomasz Jóźwik (since 24th October 2024)

== Gallery ==
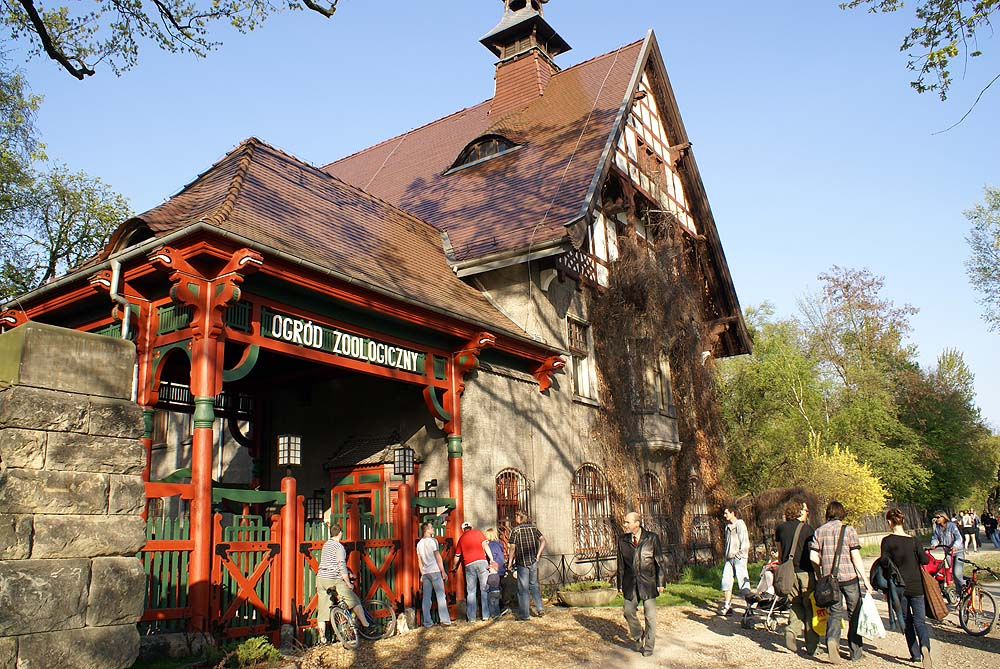
Japan Gate

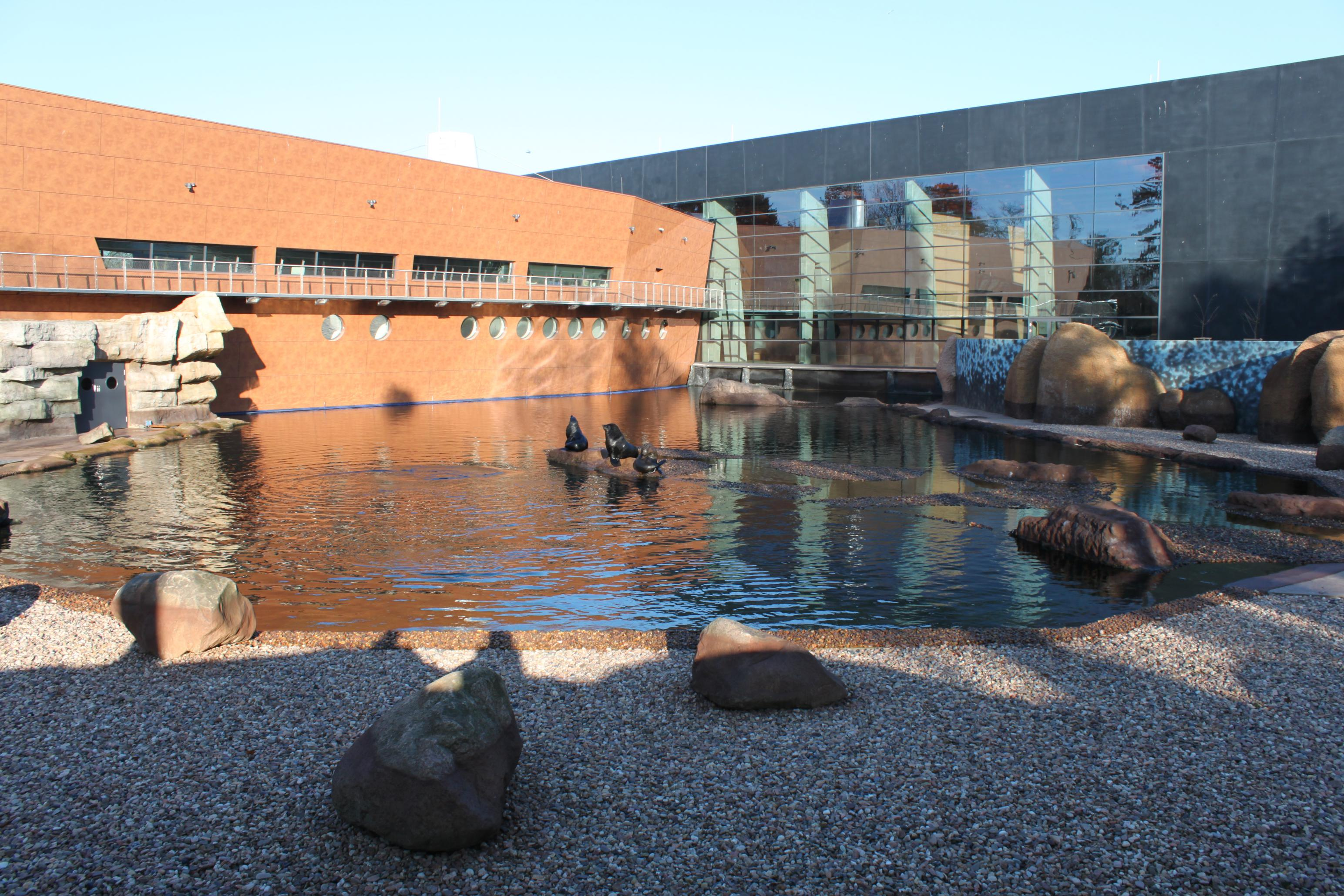
Africarium-Oceanarium (exterior)

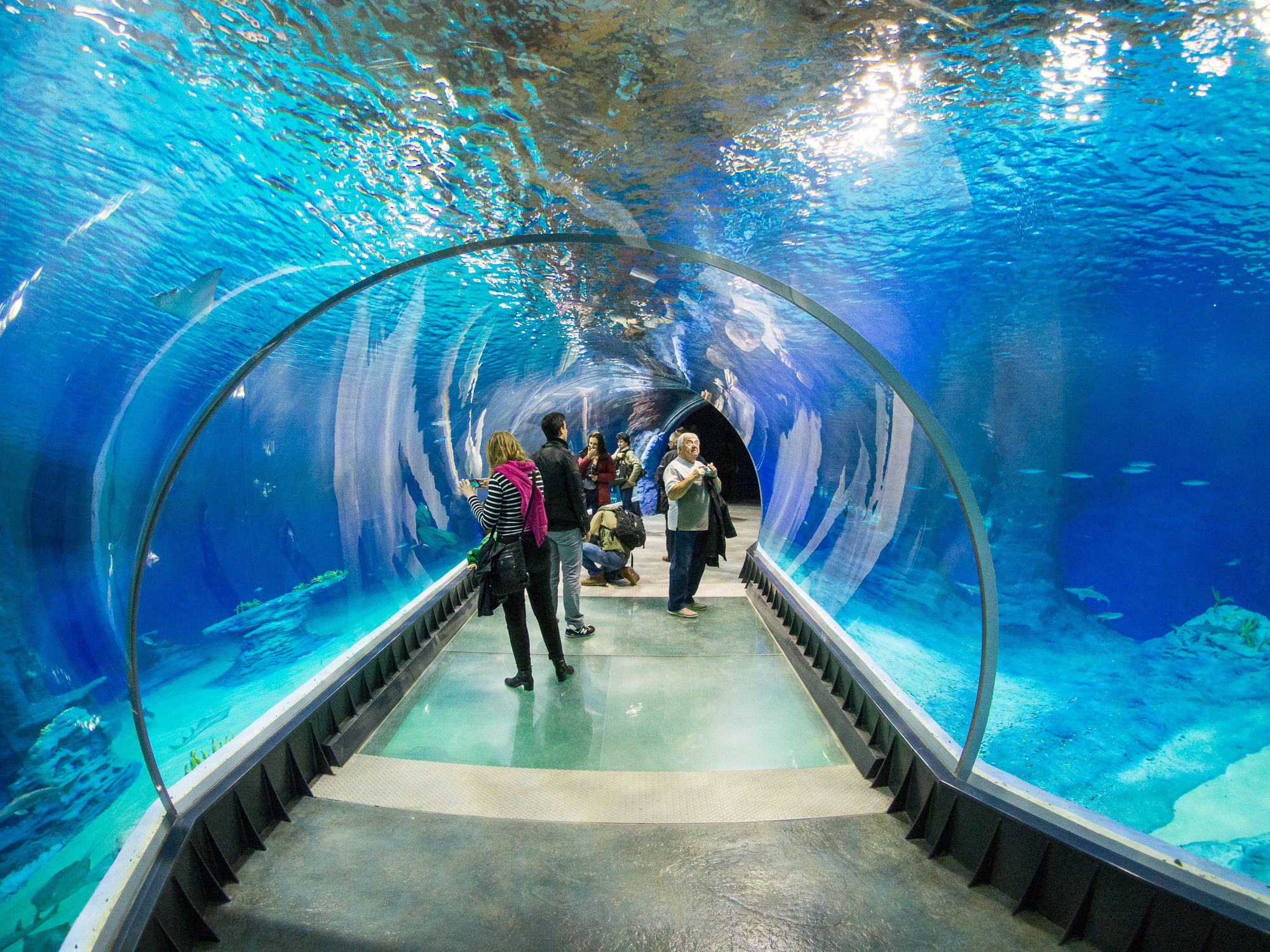
Africarium-Oceanarium (interior)

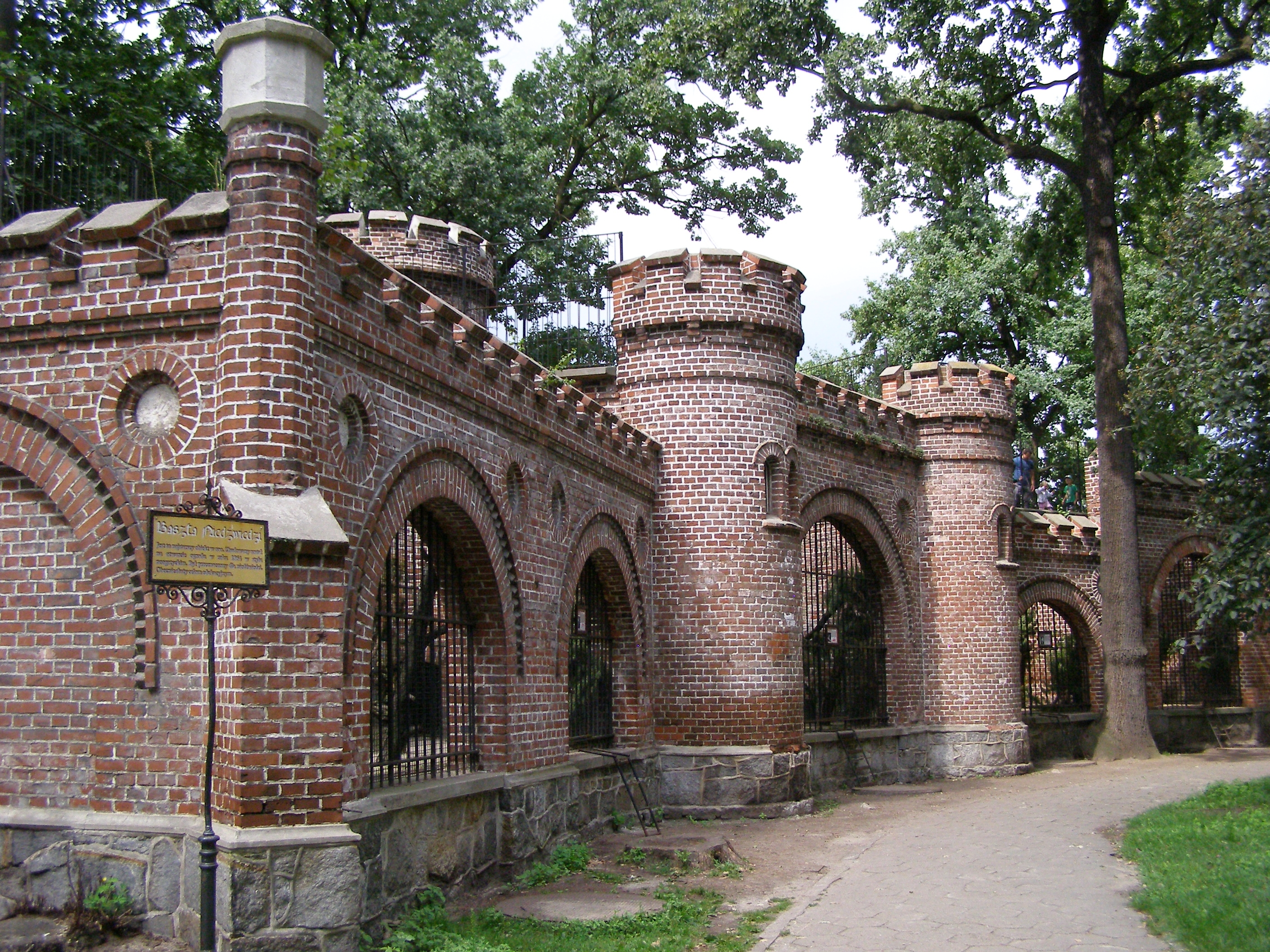
"The Bear Fortress"

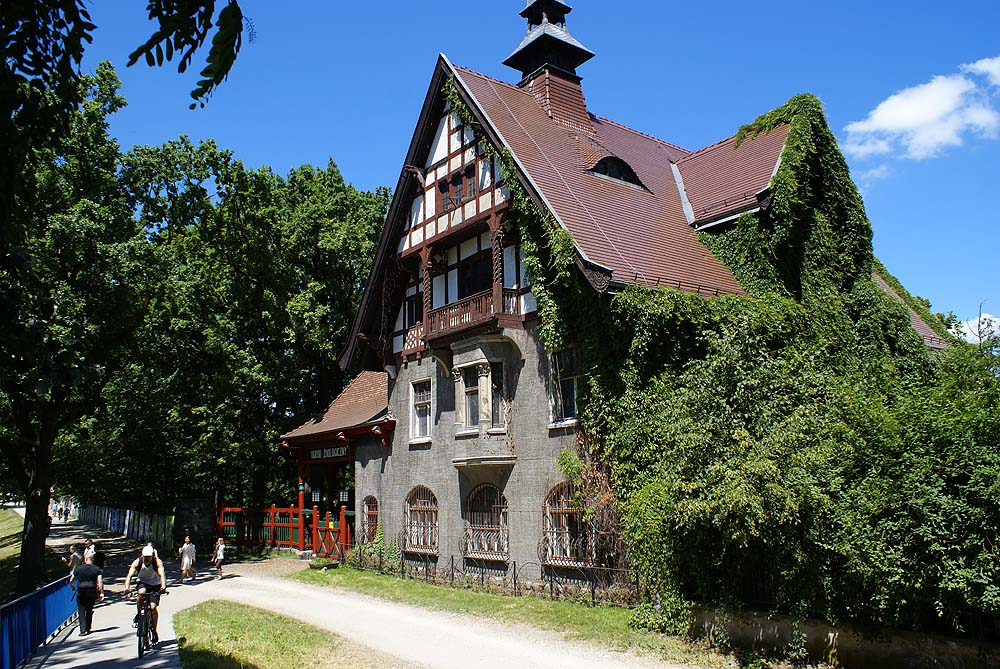
Building of the management

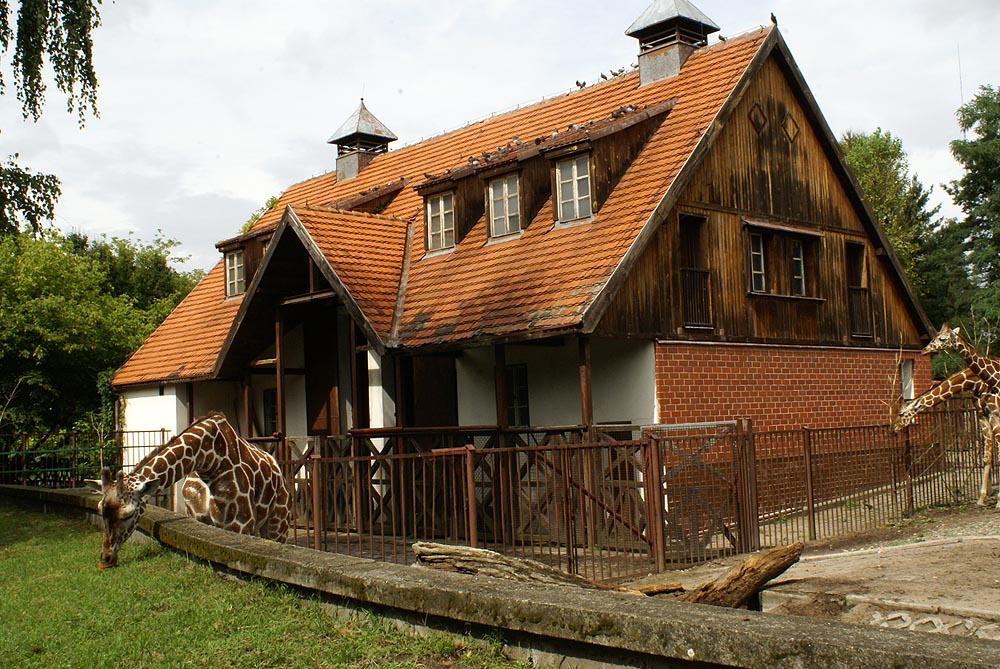
Giraffes

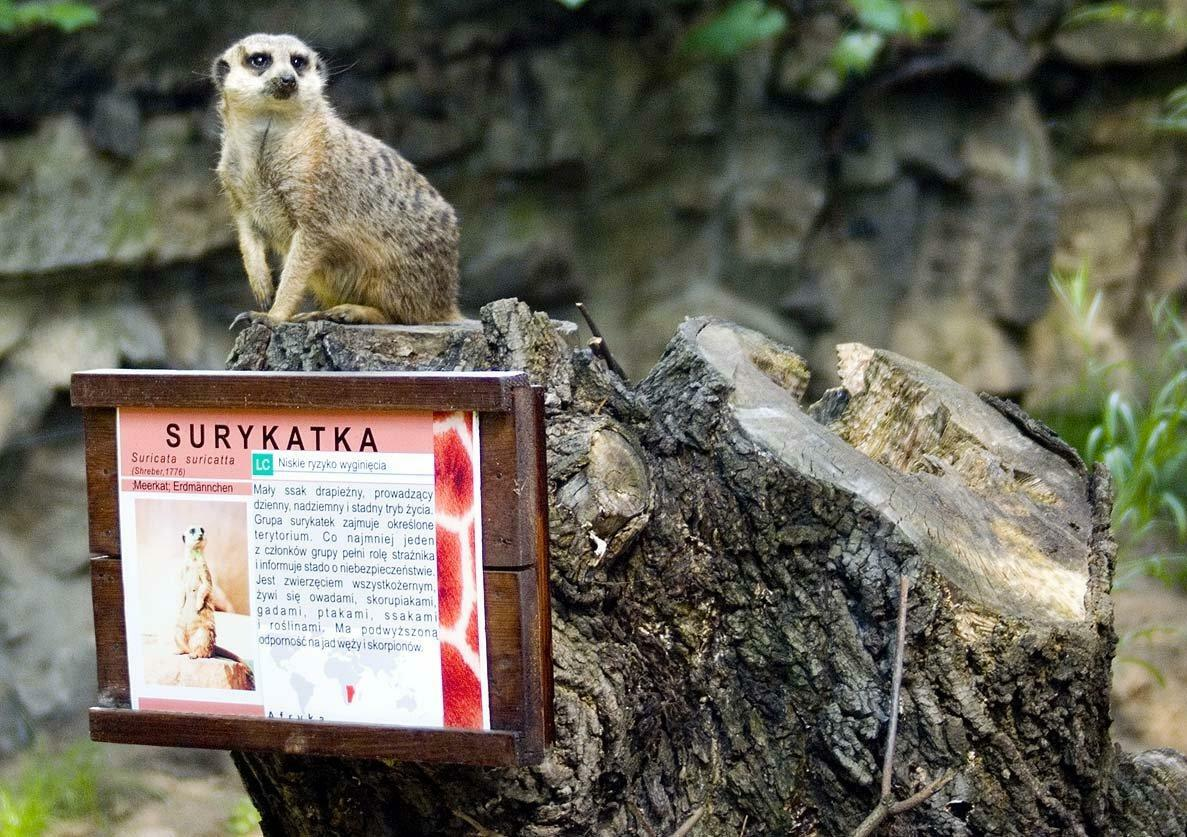
A meerkat in Wrocław Zoo

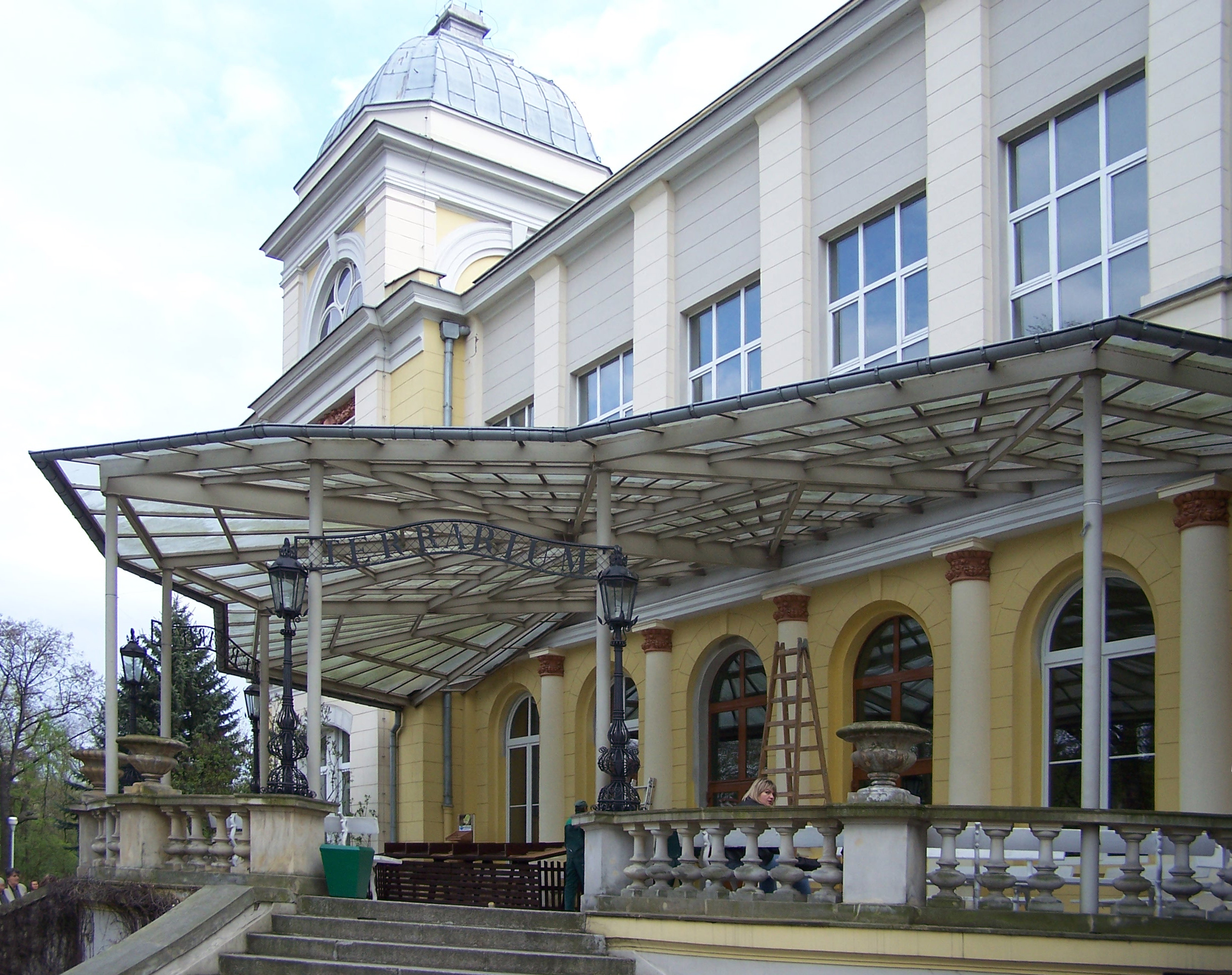
A terrarium building at the Wrocław Zoo

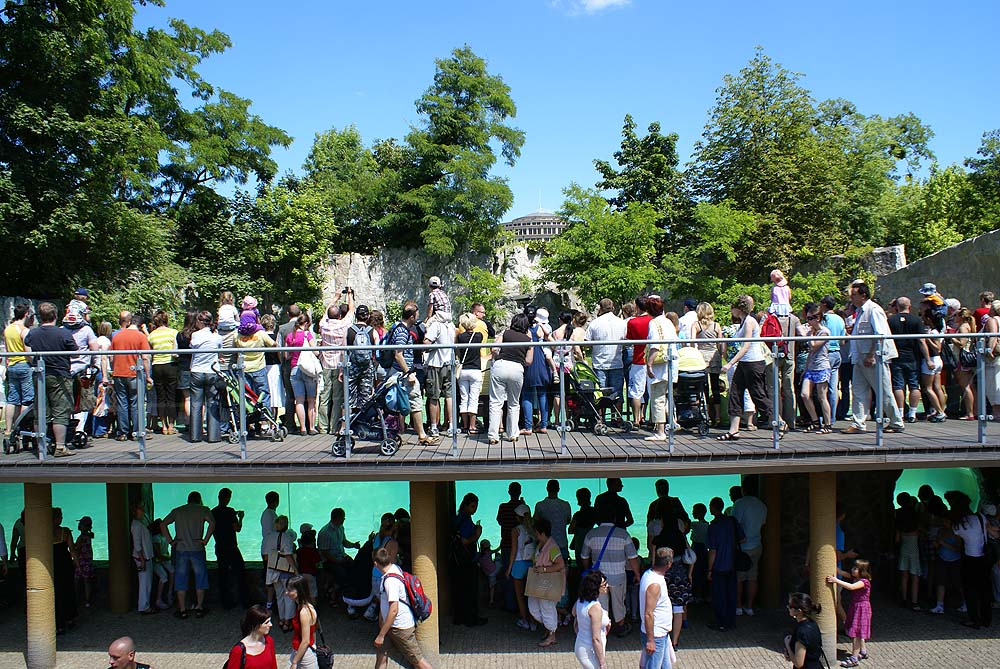
The Seal Centre

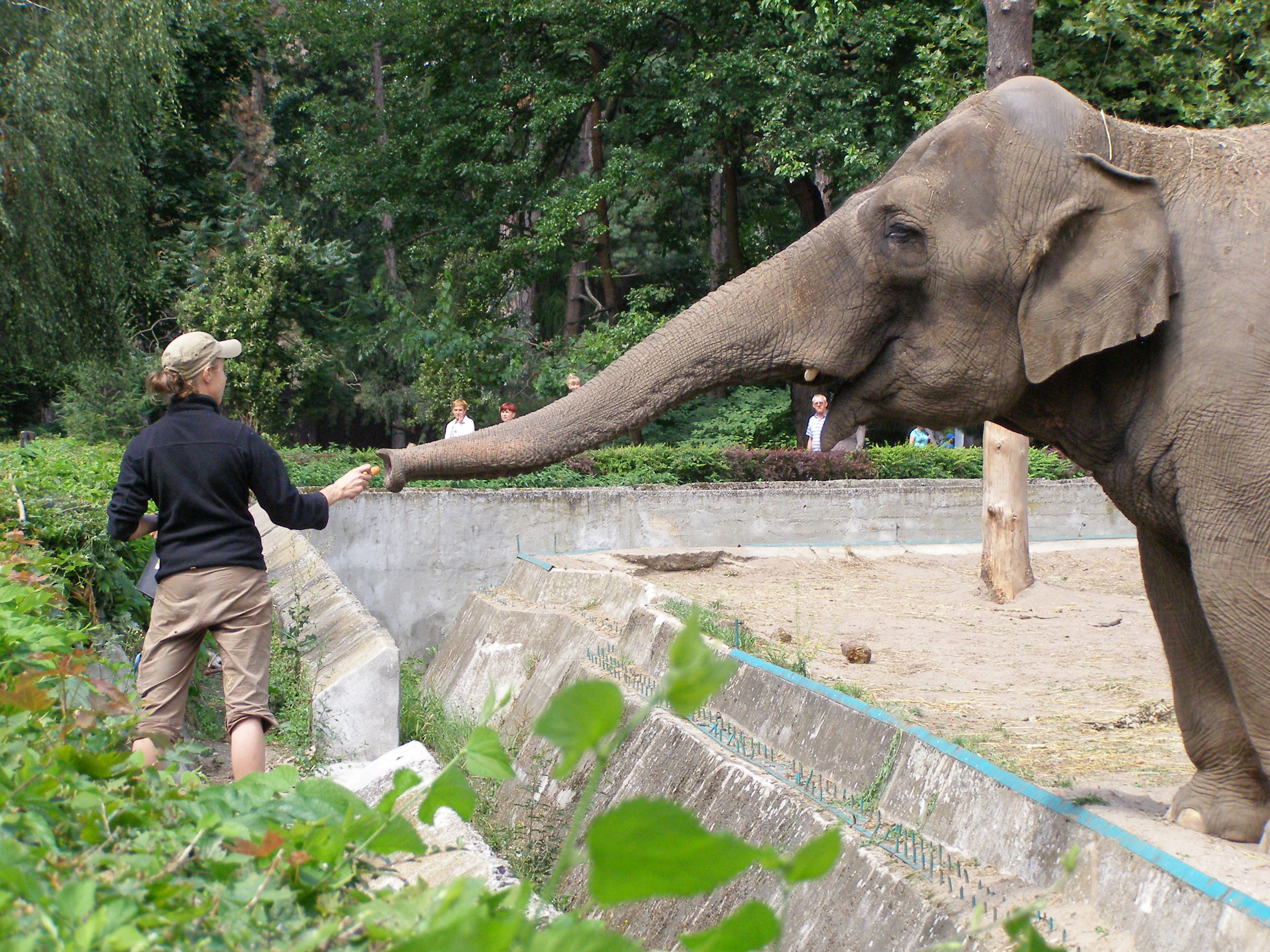
Indian elephant

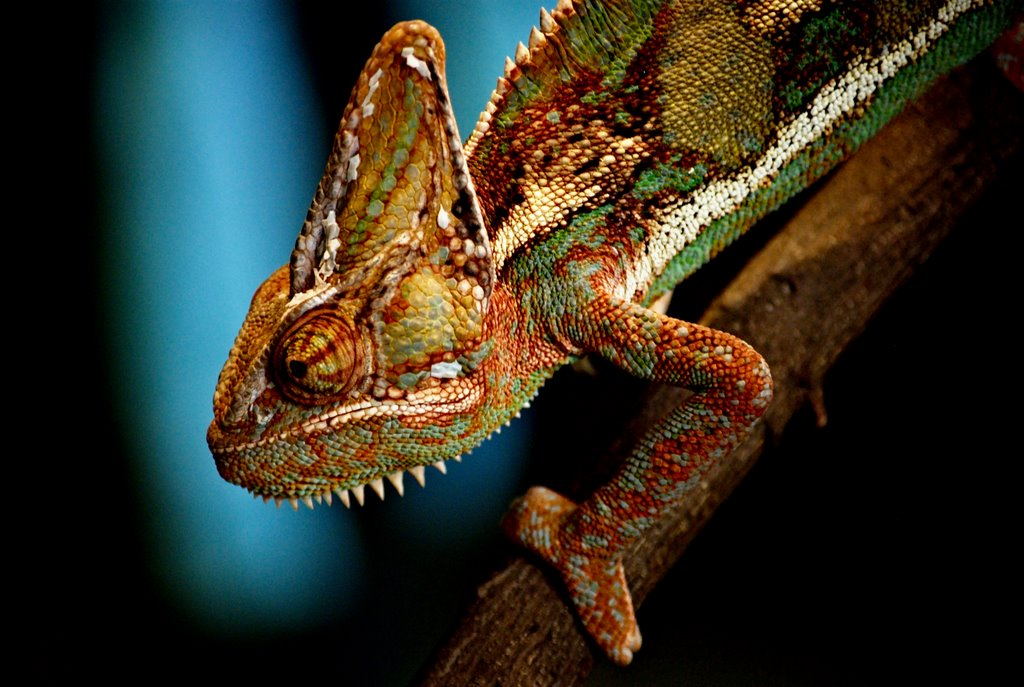
Chameleon

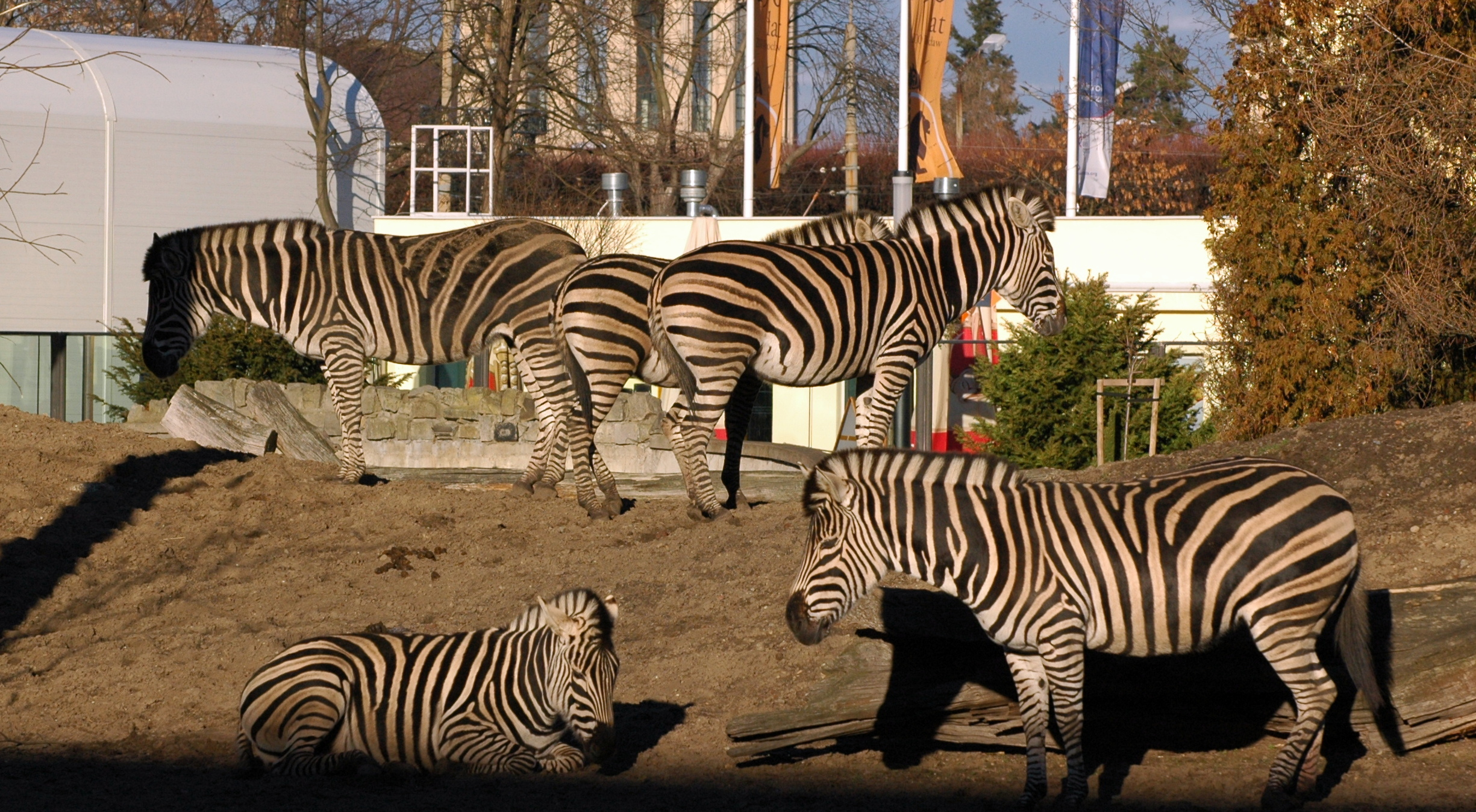
Zebras

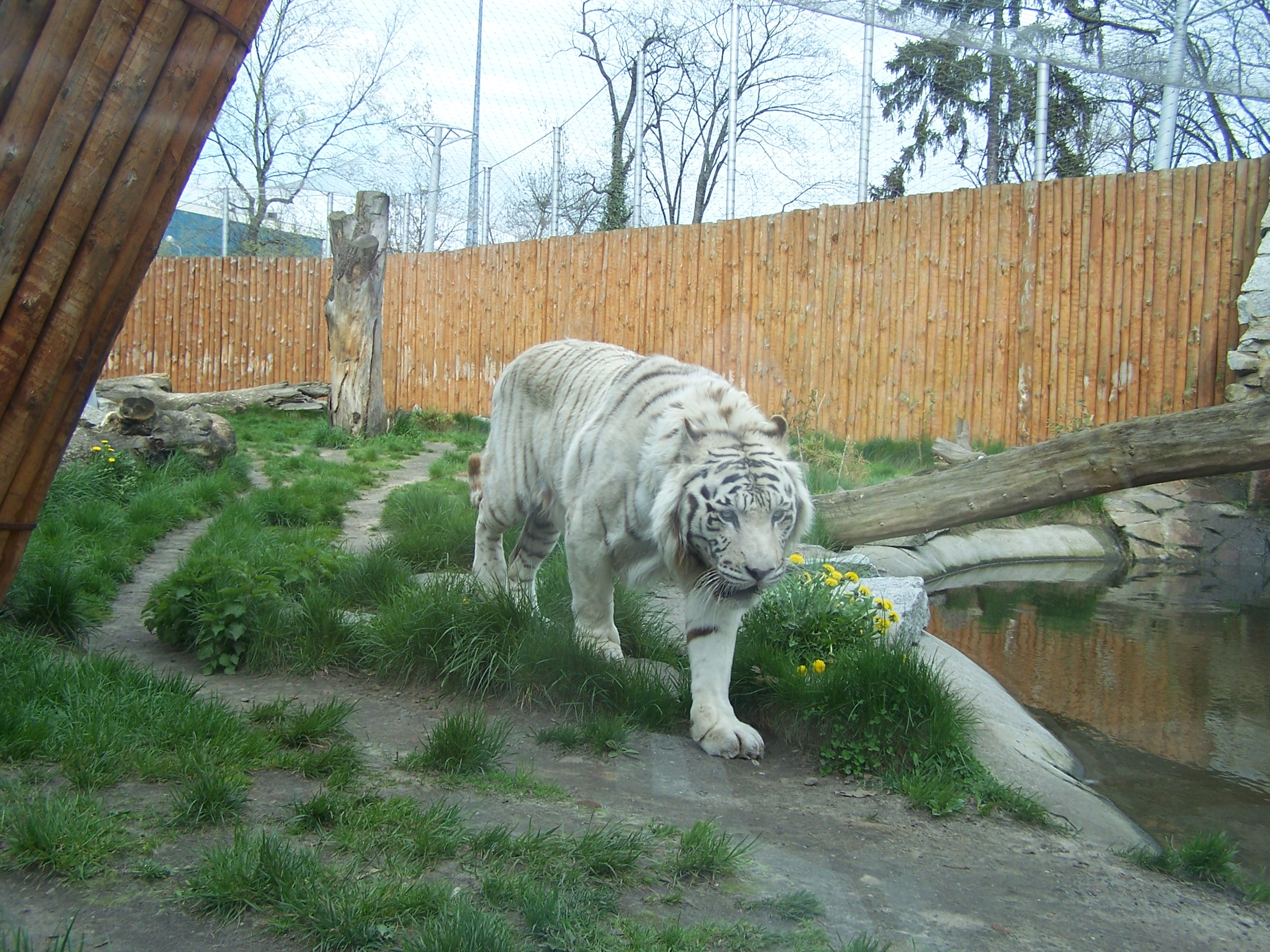
White tiger

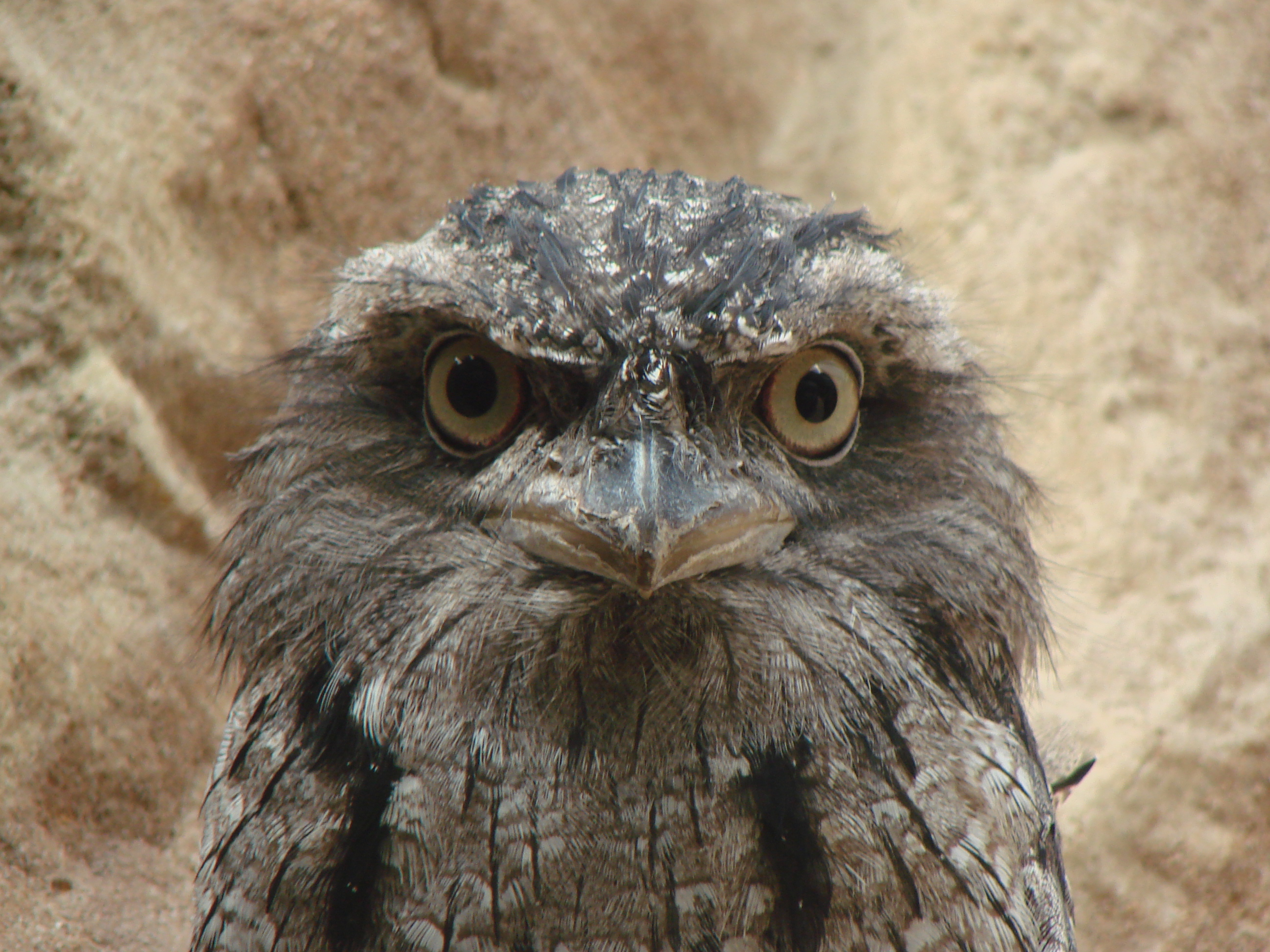
Tawny frogmouth

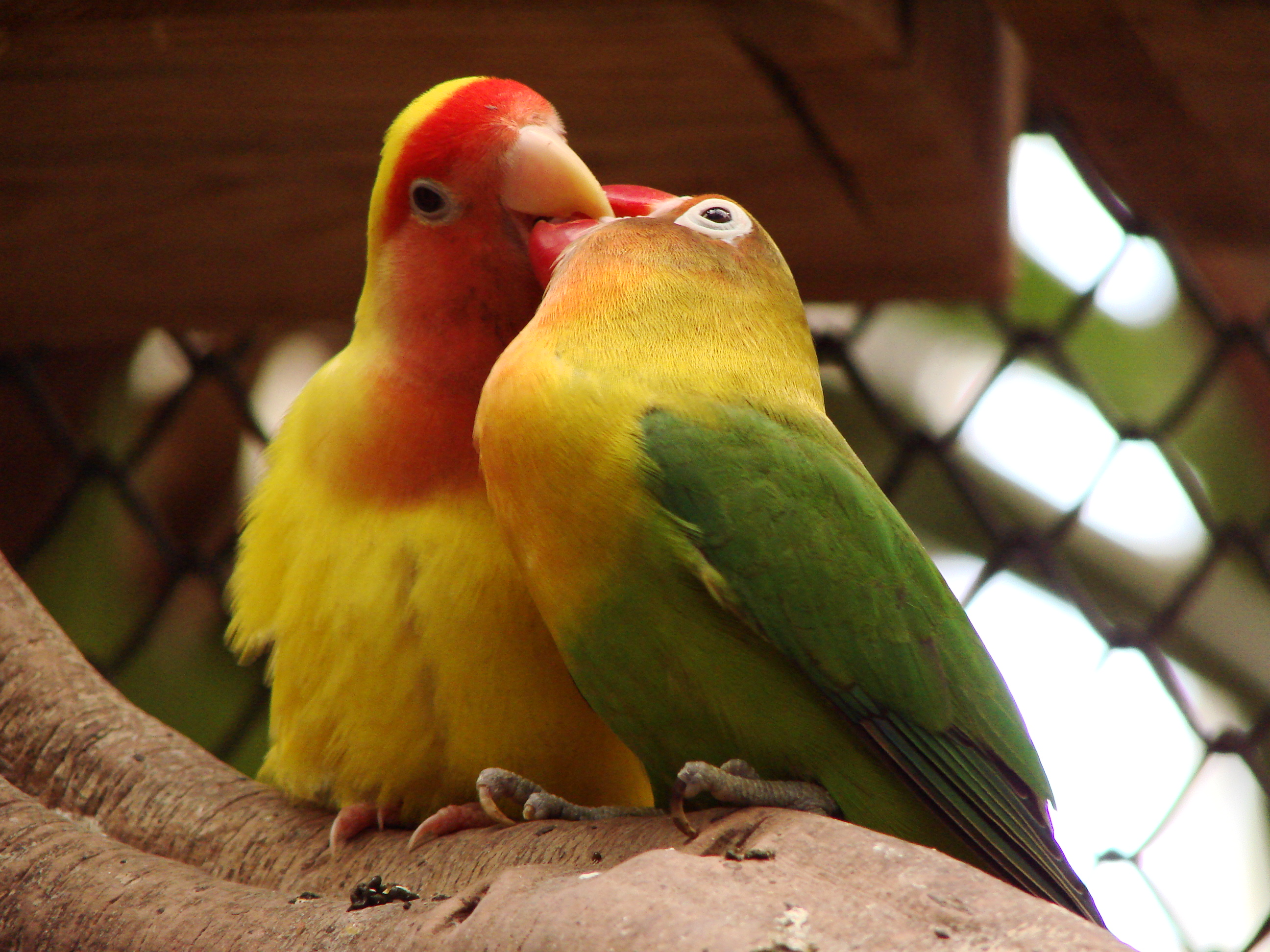
Fischer's lovebird

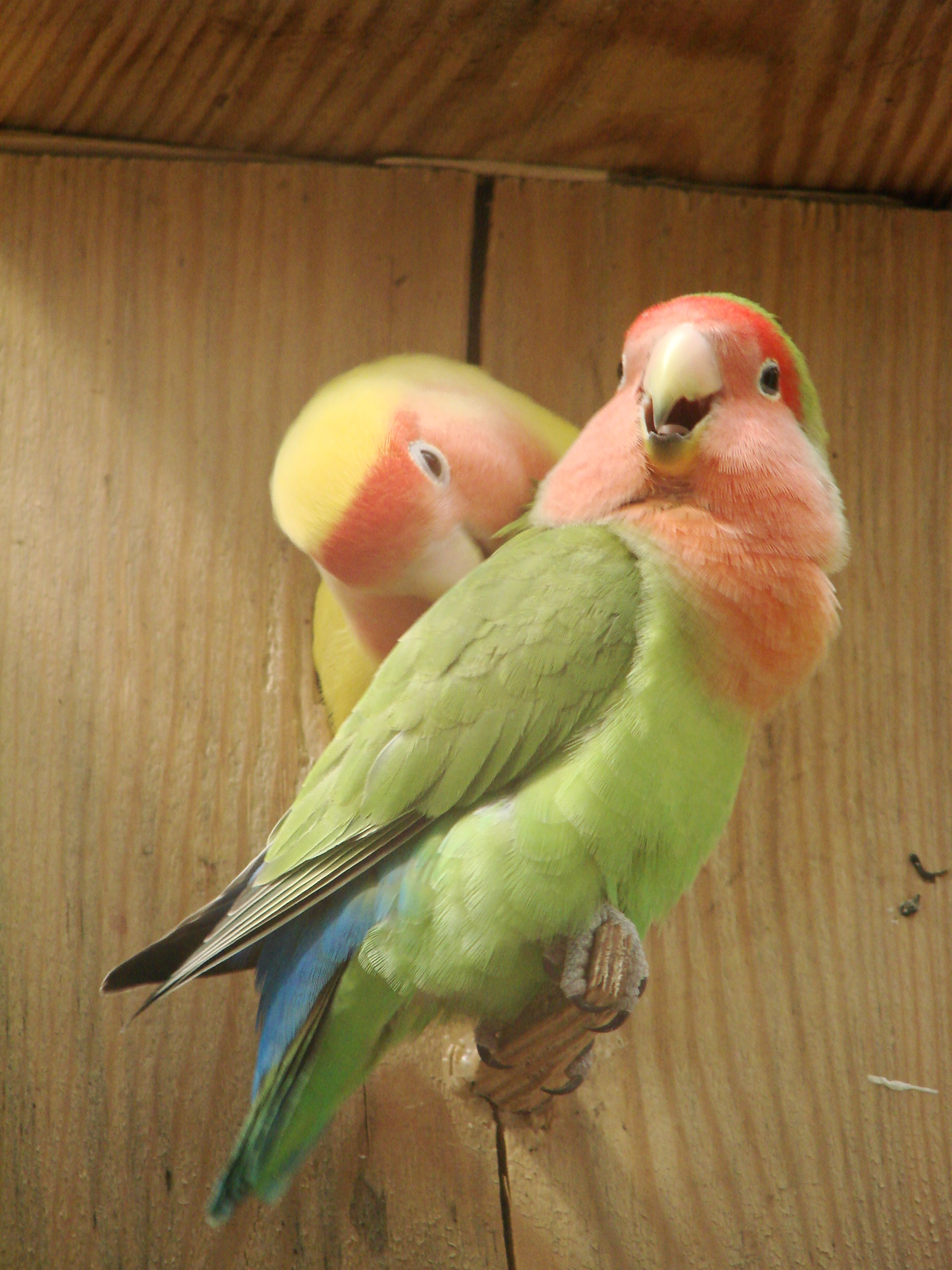
Rosy-faced lovebird

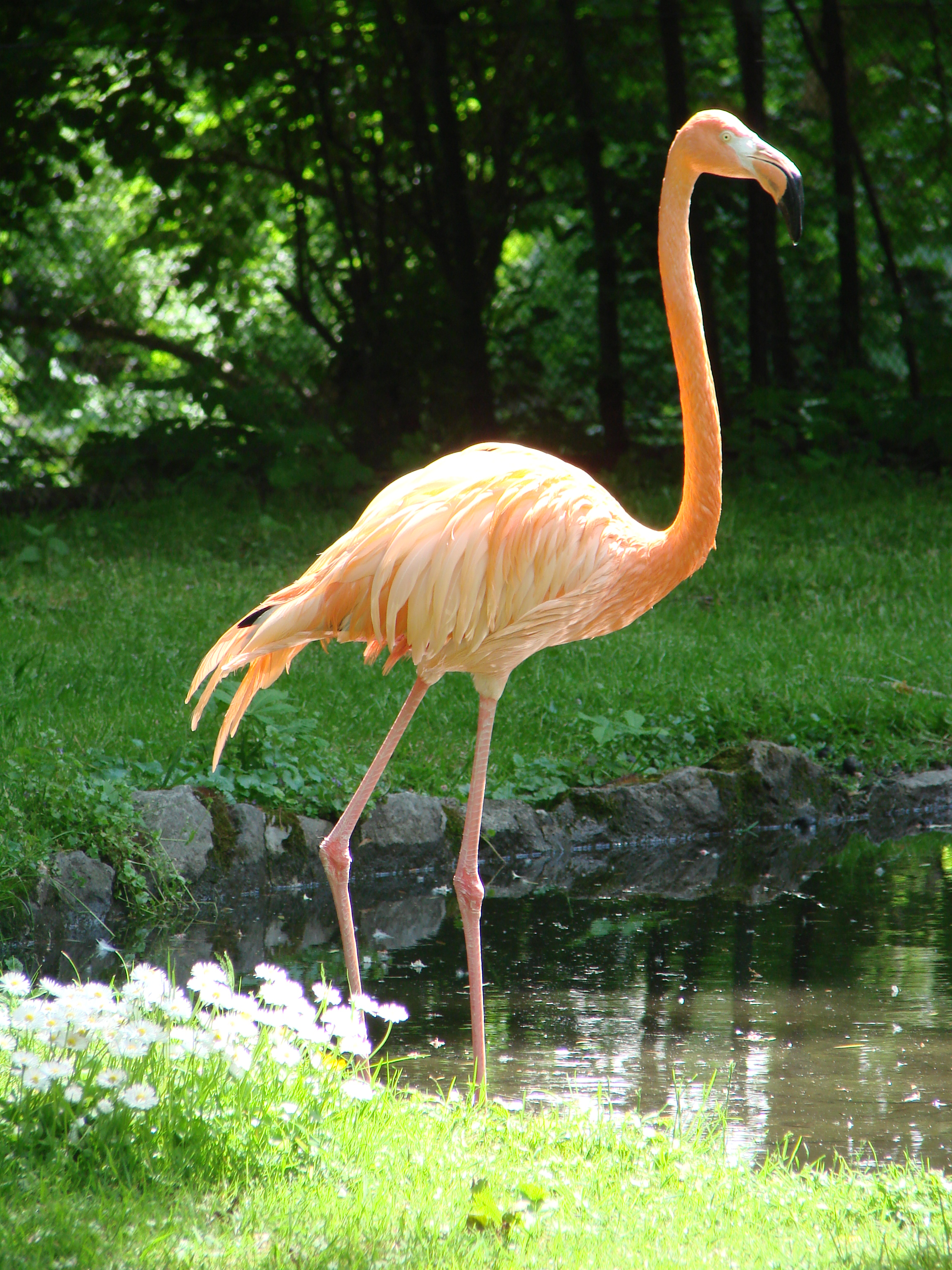
American flamingo

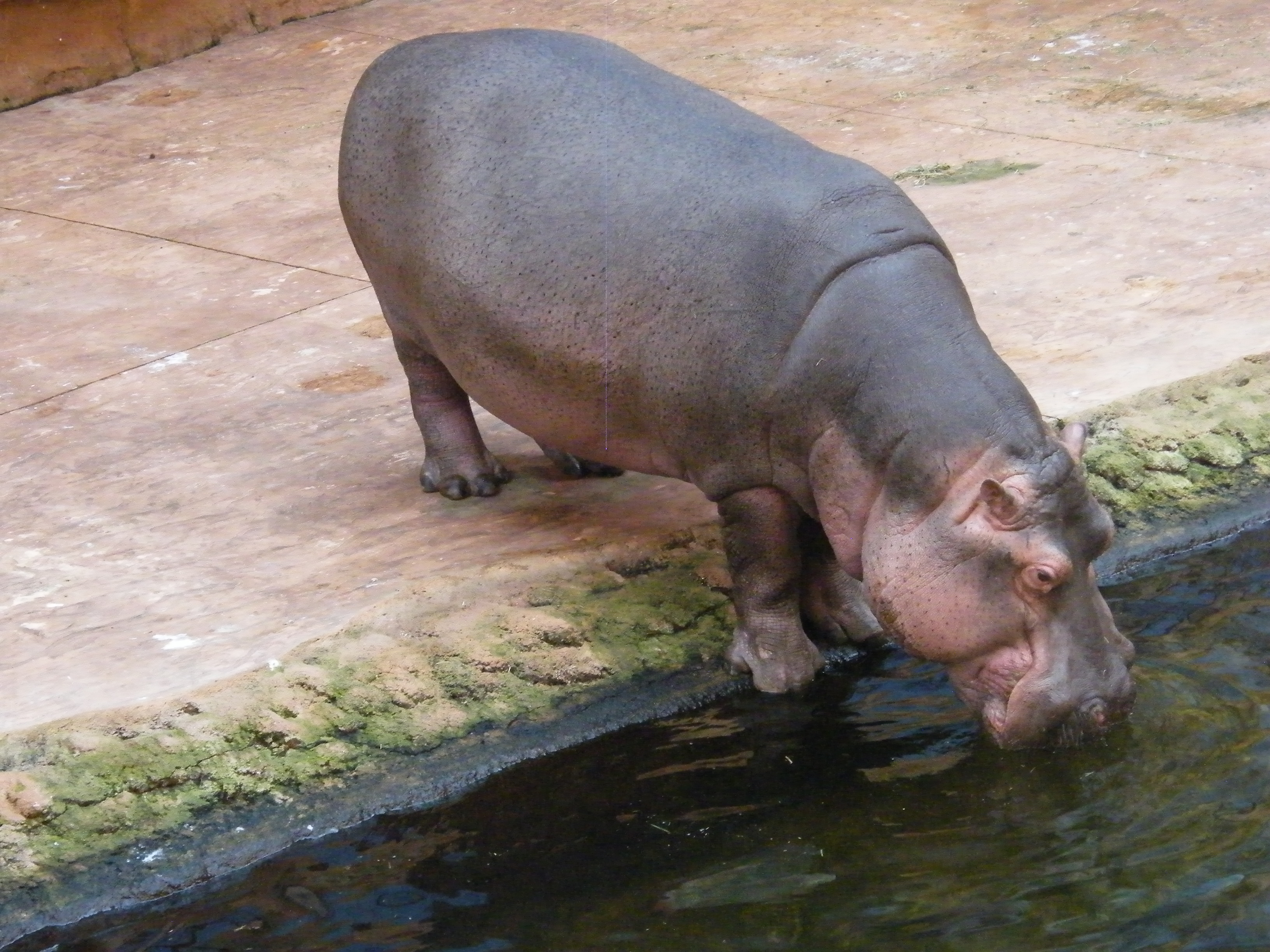
Hippopotamus

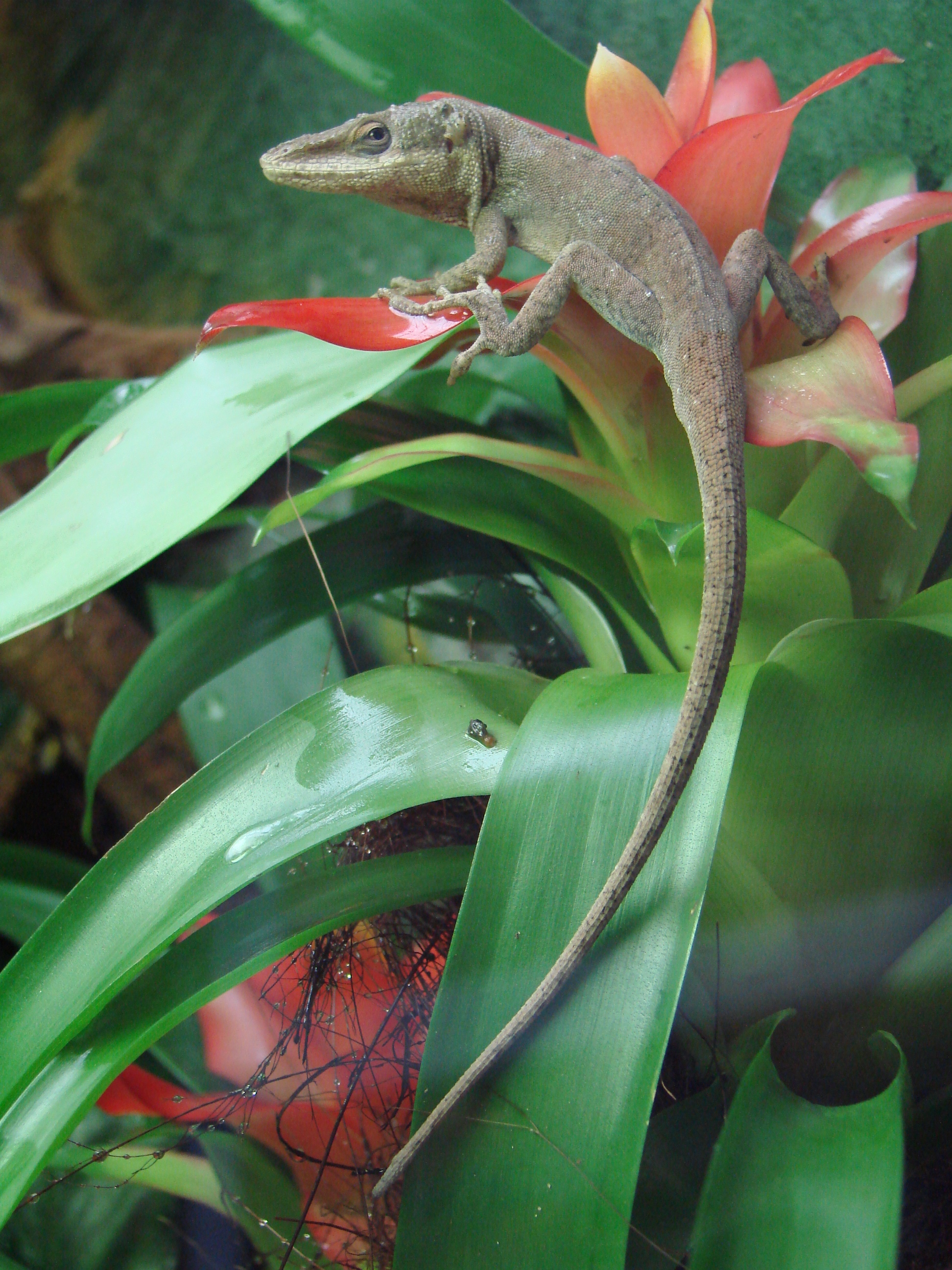
Carolina anole

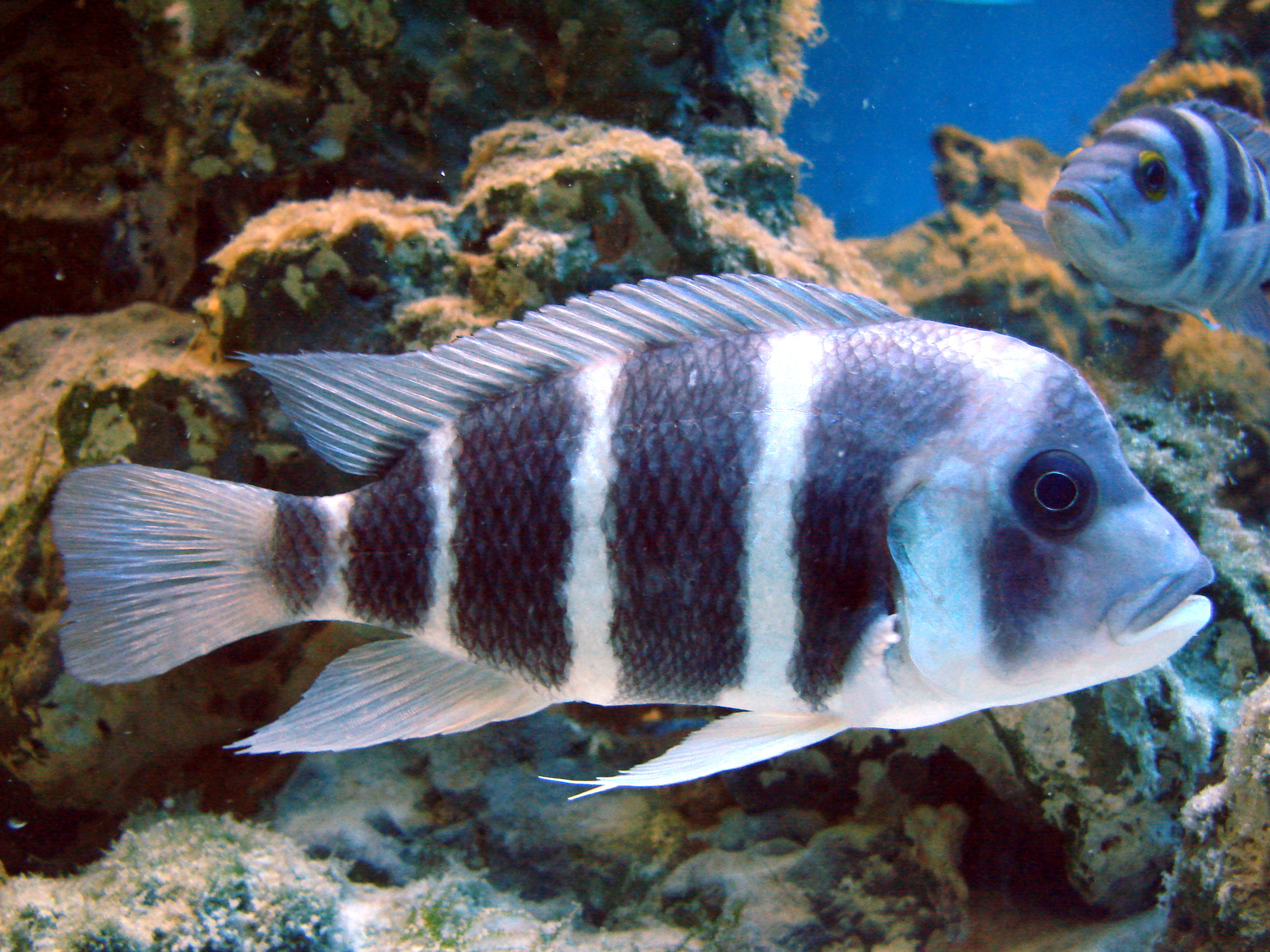
Cyphotilapia frontosa, a species of fish endemic to Lake Tanganyika

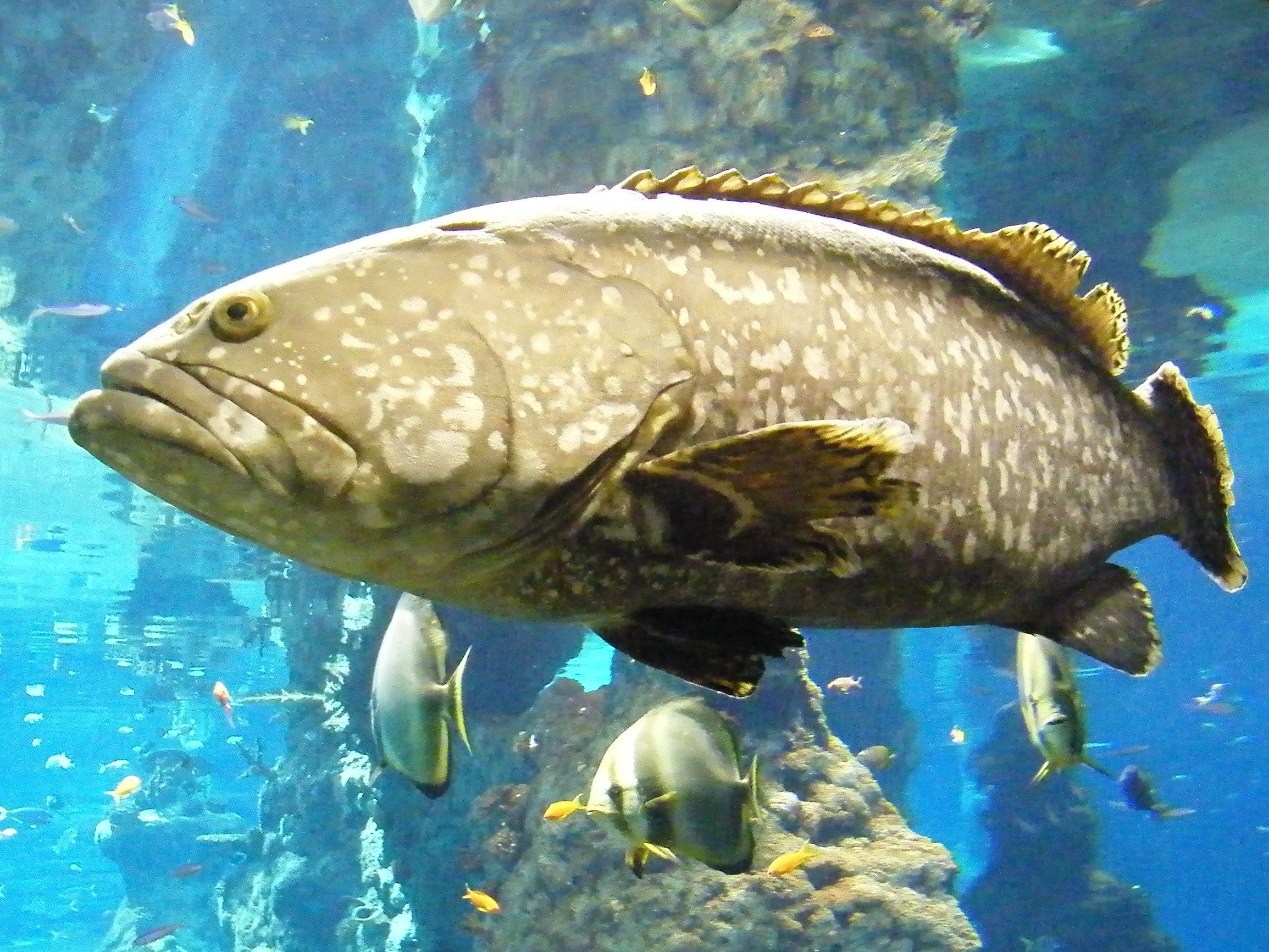
Giant grouper

== See also ==
- Warsaw Zoo
- Poznań Old Zoo
- Kraków Zoo
- Łódź Zoo
